= W. Graham Robertson =

British painter

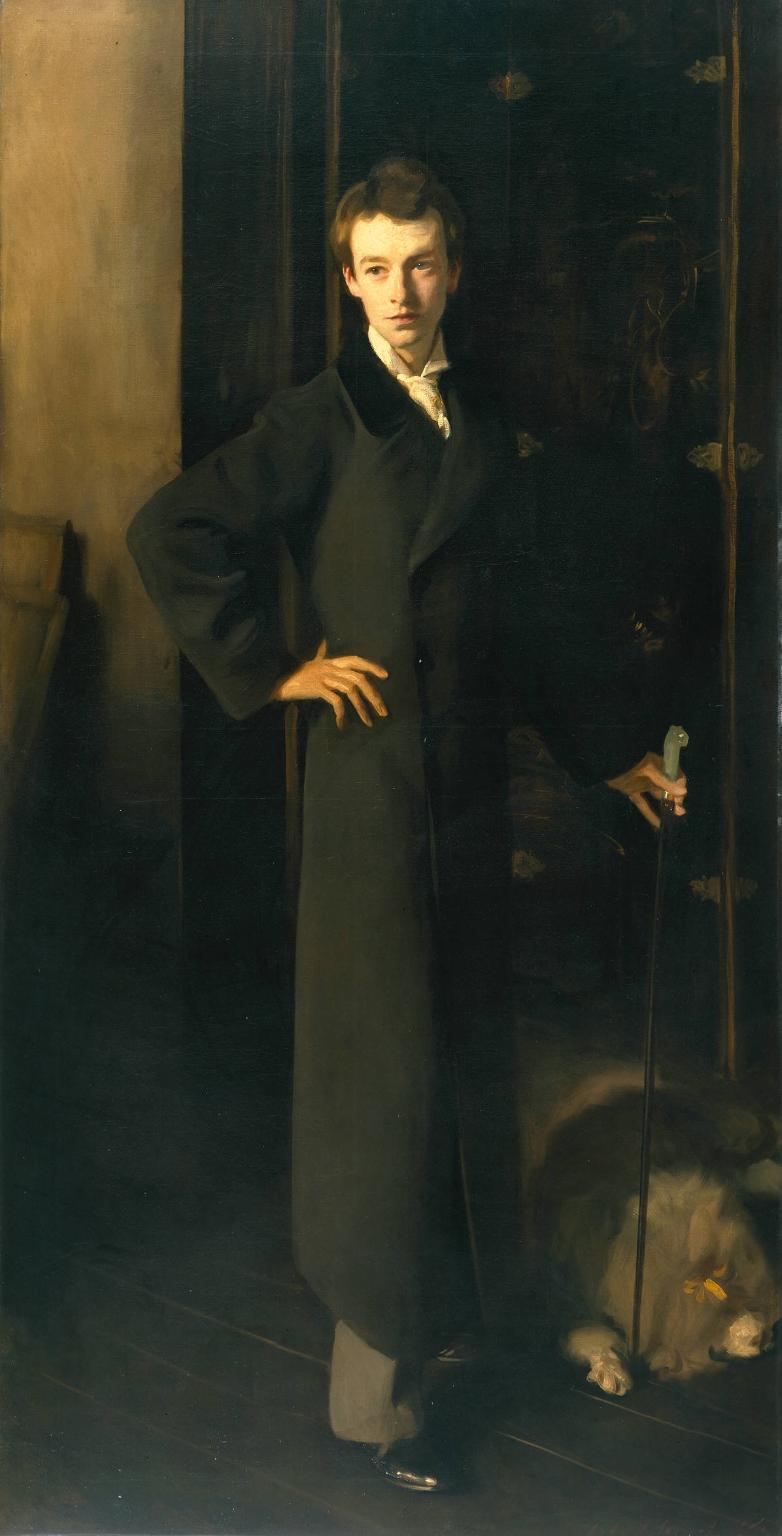
W. Graham Robertson by John Singer Sargent, 1894

Walford Graham Robertson (8 July 1866 – 4 September 1948) was a British painter, illustrator and author. He donated over 20 works of art to the Tate Gallery, London.

"In the London of Beardsley and Beerbohm, Shaw and Henry James, Robertson was a promising presence in the art and theater worlds. Today the museums of England owe a debt to his taste and judgment", according to The New York Times. He was an important collector of art, especially William Blake. He wrote plays, novels and a memoir, Life Was Worth Living (1931). He painted and illustrated books. He designed costumes for Sarah Bernhardt and Ellen Terry. He was twice portrayed by John Singer Sargent. He was sociable, and knew many notable people including Oscar Wilde and artists. He was a source of witty quotes and anecdotes. The New York Times printed a biographical article about him in 2001.

Immediately following his death, a catalogue of his Blake collection was published, and in 1953 a collection of his letters was issued.

According to Cardiff University Professor Emeritus Peter Hunt, Robertson shared a house in London with the author Kenneth Grahame, while Grahame's wife and son lived in Berkshire.
