= Louise Latimer =

Louise Latimer may refer to:

- Louise Latimer (actress) (1913–1973), American actress
- Louise Latimer (tennis) (born 1978), British tennis player
- Louise Payson Latimer (1878–1962), American librarian and author
