= Roberta Seelinger Trites =

Roberta Seelinger Trites (born 1962) is a Distinguished Professor of English Literature at Illinois State University, specializing in children's literature.

Trites graduated from Texas A&M University in 1983, and earned a master's degree from the University of Texas at Dallas in 1985. She received her Ph.D. in 1991 from Baylor University with a dissertation entitled Twain's innocence, Clemens' experience : narrative inconsistencies in The Innocents Abroad under the direction of James R. LeMaster. She joined the Illinois State faculty as an assistant professor in 1991, and became Distinguished Professor in 2013.

She has written the following books:

- Waking Sleeping Beauty: Feminist Voices in Children's Novels (University of Iowa Press, 1997).
- Disturbing the Universe: Power and Repression in Adolescent Literature (University of Iowa Press, 1998). This book was awarded the Children's Literature Association book award in 2002.
- Twain, Alcott and the Birth of the Adolescent Reform Novel (University of Iowa Press, 2007).
- A Narrative Compass: Stories that Guide Women’s Lives (edited with Betsy Hearne, University of Iowa Press, 2009).
- Literary Conceptualizations of Growth: Metaphors and Cognition in Adolescent Literature (John Benjamins Publishing Co., 2014).

Trites is the winner of the 16th International Brothers Grimm Award of the International Institute for Children's Literature in Osaka, Japan, becoming the third American and the first American woman to win the award.
