= Lidia Charskaya =

Russian writer and actress

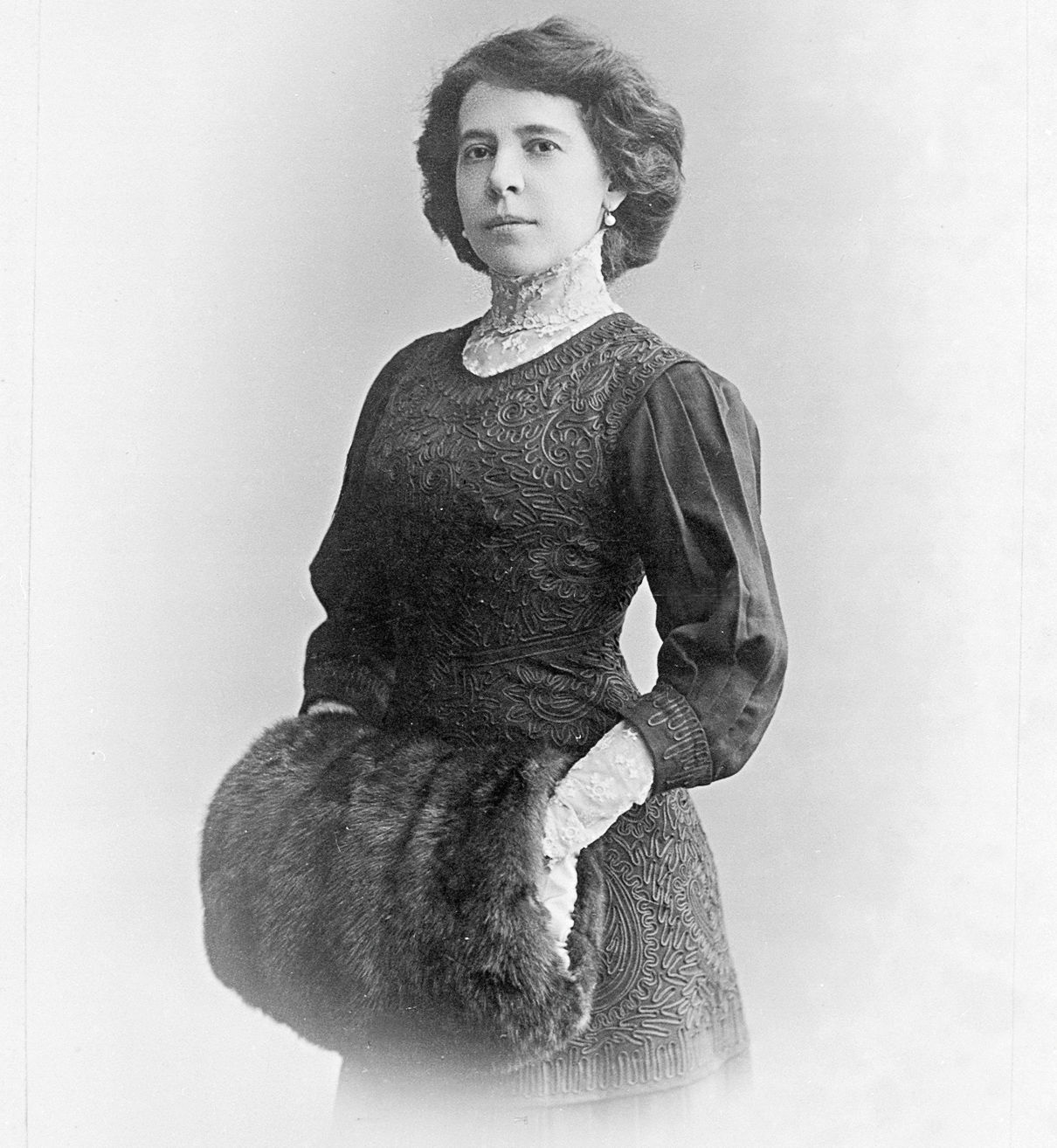
- Born: January 31, 1875; Saint Petersburg, Russian Empire
- Died: March 18, 1938 (aged 63); Leningrad, Russian SFSR, Soviet Union

Lidia Alekseyevna Charskaya (Russian: Ли́дия Алексе́евна Чар́ская; January 31, 1875 – March 18, 1938), was a Russian writer and actress. Charskaya was her pseudonym; her real last name was Churilova.

== Biography ==
Charskaya worked as an actress at the Alexandrinsky Theatre from 1898 to 1924. From 1901 to 1916 she published about eighty books, several of which became bestsellers.

== Novels ==
Charskaya's most popular work was the novel Princess Dzhavakha (1903). In the 1940s, when Boris Pasternak was writing his novel Doctor Zhivago, he said that he was "writing almost like Charskaya", because he wanted to be accessible and dreamed that his prose would be gulped down "even by a seamstress, even by a dishwasher."

Her novels fall into four general categories: stories that take place in boarding schools for elite girls; historical novels about women; autobiographical novels that follow the heroine from boarding school to a career; and detective and adventure stories. The main theme of most of her works is friendship among girls. The protagonists are usually independent girls and women who look for adventure or some kind of diversion from the everyday routine. Critics have commented that these characteristics account in large part for the wide popularity of Charskaya's works among young girls in early 20th century Russia.

== Retirement and post-Soviet reputation ==
Charskaya's reputation began to fade in 1912 after the critic Korney Chukovsky published an article in which he wrote that her books were formulaic, repetitious, and excessive with respect to female emotions. She stopped publishing in 1916, and in 1920 her works were banned. From 1924 until her death in 1938 she lived in poverty, supported mostly by friends. Throughout the Soviet period her work was lowly regarded, although there is plenty of evidence that young girls continued secretly to read her works, at least through the 1930s. In the late 1980s and 1990s Charskaya's works were revived in Russia, as several of her works appeared in new editions.
