= Peter Hunt (literary critic) =

British scholar (born 1945)

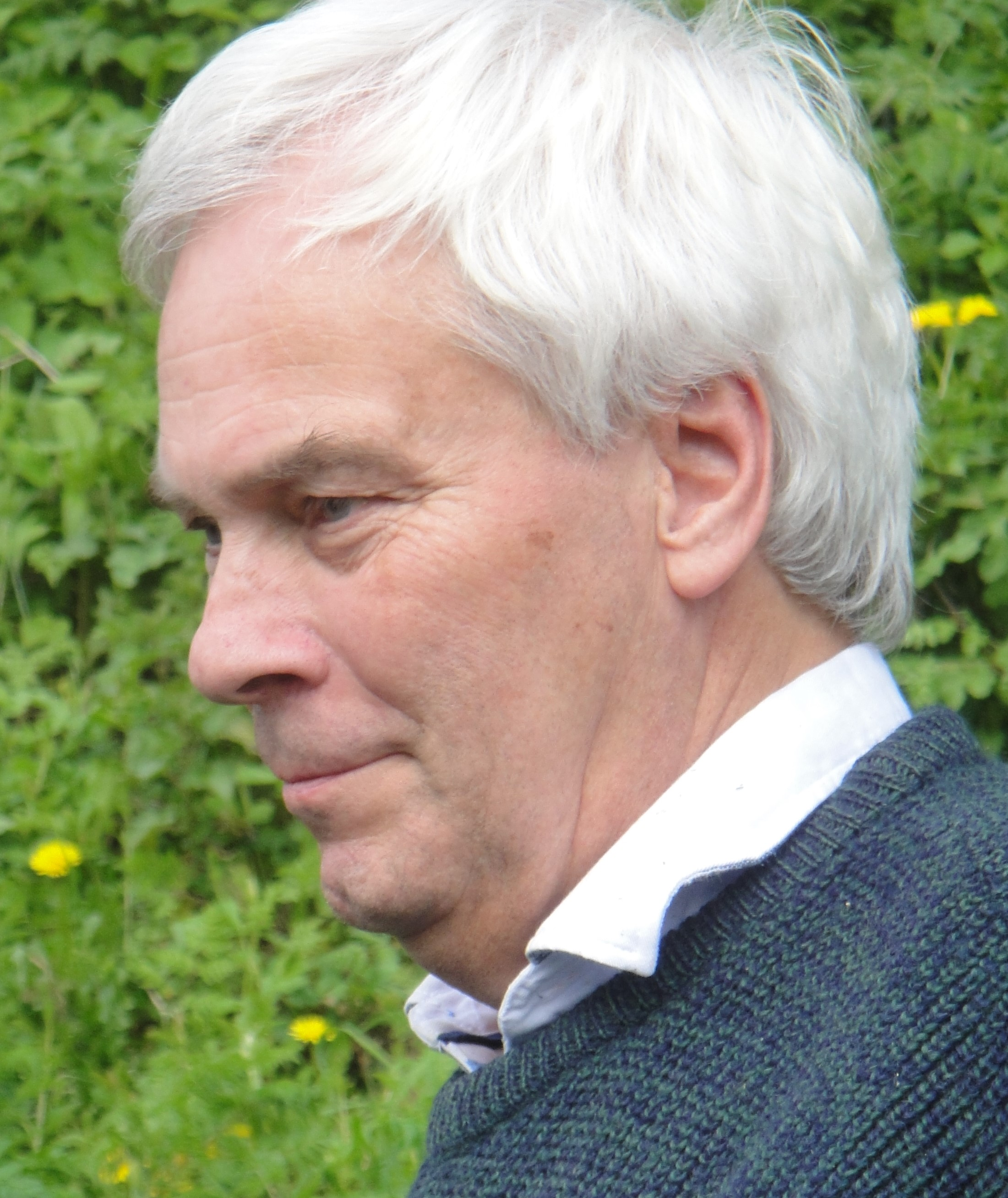

Peter Hunt (born 1945) is a British scholar who is professor emeritus in English and children's literature at Cardiff University, UK, and adjunct professor in the School of English at Dublin City University.

Hunt was a pioneer of the academic study of children's literature as a literary, rather than educational, discipline at university level, and 'he has been instrumental in creating a world network of those whose research concerns are located in this domain'. The courses that he ran at Cardiff from 1985 were the first of their kind in the UK. He has lectured on children's literature at over 150 universities, colleges and to learned societies in 23 countries, and over the past few years he has been visiting professor at Trinity College, Dublin, Università Ca’Foscari Venice, Newcastle University and Hollins University, Roanoke VA, USA.

He has written or edited 38 books and over 600 papers, reference book entries, and reviews on the subject. His books have been translated into Arabic, Chinese, Danish, Greek, Japanese, Korean, Persian, Portuguese (Brazil) and Serbian. In 1995 he was given the Distinguished Scholarship Award from the International Association for the Fantastic in the Arts, in 2003 the Brothers Grimm Award for services to children's literature, from the International Institute for Children's Literature, Osaka., in 2018 a Lifetime Achievement Award from the Universita degli Suor Orsula Benincasa, Naples, and in 2020 the Anne Devereaux Jordan Award for Distinguished Service to Children's Literature from the Children's Literature Association, USA.

== Scholarly work ==
Hunt's main preoccupations have been to reconcile mainstream critical theory and practice with the unique demands of texts for children, and to provide accessible resources for the discipline. He coined the term 'childist criticism', 'a position rather than method' that addresses 'what some regard as a weakness in children's literature studies: the tendency to use theories from other disciplines rather than generate original approaches, and it can usefully be compared with ... écriture feminine’. 'He argued that 'criticism should seek to understand children’s books in the economic, psychological, educational and personal contexts in which they are read by children'. This approach, and a contentious attempt to distinguish between books that are for children and books that were for children, were developed in Criticism, Theory and Children's Literature (1991) and Children's Literature [Blackwell Guides to Literature] (2000). Major reference works include Children's Literature: an Illustrated History (1995), International Companion Encyclopedia of Children's Literature (2nd edn. 2 vols, 2004), Children’s Literature: Critical Concepts in Literary and Cultural Studies (4 vols, 2006) and The Norton Anthology of Children’s Literature. The Traditions in English (2005).

He has edited five classic children's books for Oxford University Press's 'World’s Classics'. Ironically, he is probably the world authority on The Wind in the Willows having written two books about it, despite maintaining that it is not a children’s book.

His most recent work includes a co-written comparative study: The Fabulous Journeys of Alice and Pinocchio (2018). and three volumes for the Bodleian Library, Oxford.

== Fiction ==
'As novelist and critic he seeks to create an active role for the reading child'. His four 'slightly avant-garde' children's books one of which, A Step off the Path (1985) has been described as 'the first post-modern children’s novel’ experimented with narrative structures. In recent years he has self-published and has had privately printed seven experimental novels for his grandchidren.

== Bibliography ==
=== Theory, History, Criticism ===
- Alice's Oxford, Bodleian Library Publishing, March 2025.
- The Making of the Alice Books, Bodleian Library Publishing, 2019
- The Making of the Wind in the Willows, Bodleian Library Publishing, 2018
- Children's Literature [Blackwell Guides to Literature], Basil Blackwell, 2000
- An Introduction to Children's Literature, Oxford University Press, 1994
- The Wind in the Willows: a Fragmented Arcadia, Twayne/Macmillan, 1994
- Criticism, Theory and Children's Literature, Basil Blackwell, 1991. [Portuguese, trans São Paulo: Cosac Naify, 2010]
- Arthur Ransome, Twayne/Macmillan, 1991. [Revised edition: Approaching Arthur Ransome, Cape, 1992.]
- [with Dennis Butts] Why Wasn’t Billy Bunter Expelled and a further 25 Mysteries of Children’s Literature, Cambridge: Lutterworth Press, 2019
- [with Laura Tosi] The Fabulous Journeys of Alice and Pinocchio, McFarland, 2018
- [with Laura Tosi] As Fit as a Fish. The English and Italians Revealed, Patrician Press, 2014
- [with Dennis Butts] How Did Long John Silver Lose his Leg? And Twenty-Seven Other Mysteries of Children’s Literature, Cambridge: Lutterworth Press, 2013
- [with Lucy Pearson] Children’s Literature, Texts, Contexts, Connections, Longman, 2011
- [with Millicent Lenz] Alternative Worlds of Fantasy Fiction, Continuum, 2001
- (ed.) J. R. R. Tolkien’s The Hobbit and The Lord of the Rings: a New Casebook, Palgrave, 2014
- (ed.) Children’s Literature: Critical Concepts in Literary and Cultural Studies, Routledge, 4 volumes, 2006
- (ed.) Understanding Children's Literature, Routledge, 1999, 2nd edition, 2006 [Tehran: Arvan Publishers, [Persian] 2003.; Metaiaxmio: Athens, [Greek] 2009; Belgrade [Serbian], 2014.]
- (ed.) Children's Literature: An Anthology, 1801-1902, Basil Blackwell, 2000
- (ed.) International Companion Encyclopedia of Children's Literature, Routledge, 1996, 2nd edn. 2 vols, 2004
- (ed.) Children's Literature: An Illustrated History, Oxford University Press, 1995. [Japanese, 2001]
- (ed.) Literature for Children: contemporary criticism, Routledge, 1992
- (ed.) Children's Literature: the development of criticism, Routledge, (1990) [Japanese 1997]
- (ed.) [with Jack Zipes, Lissa Paul, Lynne Vallone, Gillian Avery] The Norton Anthology of Children’s Literature. The Traditions in English, W. W. Norton, 2005

==== Editions ====
- Bevis, Oxford World's Classics, 1989
- Alice’s Adventures in Wonderland and Through the Looking-Glass, Oxford World's Classics, 2009
- The Wind in the Willows, Oxford World's Classics, 2010
- Treasure Island, Oxford World's Classics, 2011
- The Secret Garden, Oxford World's Classics, 2011

==== Fiction ====
- The Maps of Time, MacRae, 1983.
- A Step off the Path, MacRae (1985) [Danish: as På Afveje, Modtryk, 1986.]
- Backtrack, MacRae/Walker, 1986/1992
- Going Up, MacRae/Walker, 1989/1991
- Fay Cow and the Missing Milk, MacRae/Walker, 1989/1992
- Sue and the Honey Machine, MacRae/Walker, 1989/1992
