= Jane Dabney Shackelford =

American teacher and author (1895–1979)

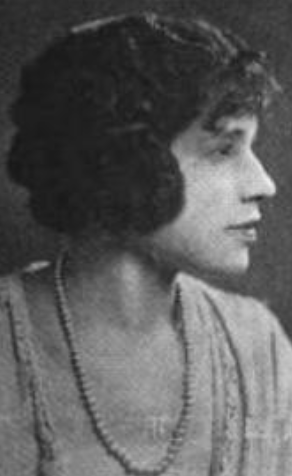
- Jane Dabney Shackelford, from a 1928 publication
- Born: Mary Jane Dabney; October 16, 1895; Clarkesville, Tennessee, U.S.
- Died: December 22, 1979 (aged 84); Terre Haute, Indiana, U.S.
- Occupations: Educator, author

Jane Dabney Shackelford (October 16, 1895 – December 22, 1979) was an American educator and writer, based in Indiana.

== Early life and education ==
Mary Jane Dabney was born in Clarksville, Tennessee, and raised in Logansport, Indiana, the daughter of George Brooks Dabney and Margaret (Maggie) Viola Stewart Dabney. She graduated from Indiana State Normal College in 1919, and earned a master's degree from Columbia University in 1927. She was a member of Alpha Kappa Alpha, and Kappa Delta Pi.

== Career ==
Shackelford taught school in Terre Haute, Indiana for 43 years, from 1919 until she retired in 1962. She also led a Girl Scout troop in Terre Haute, from 1936 into the 1950s. To address a gap in the literature for elementary students, she wrote The Child's Story of the Negro (1938, with illustrations by Lois Mailou Jones), and My Happy Days (1944, with photographs by fellow educator Cecil Vinton).

Carter G. Woodson appreciated Shackelford's work, and considered her to be a helpful early supporter of Black history content for young children. In addition to her books and teaching, she created booklets for young readers, as head of the Terre Haute branch of the Indiana Negro Historical Society.

== Publications ==
- The Child's Story of the Negro (1938, illustrated by Lois Mailou Jones)
- My Happy Days (1944, with Cecil Vinton)

== Personal life and legacy ==
Dabney married Kyzer Shackelford in 1915. They had a son, Montrose, who served in World War II. Shackelford died in 1979, at the age of 84. There is a collection of her scrapbooks and other papers in the Vigo County Public Library Archives. Recent scholarship recognizes Shackelford's work as important early Black history for school use, while noting that it holds contradictory messages about social integration and cultural distinctiveness, and presents Africa as exotic and primitive, both common narratives for its era.
