= Louise Payson Latimer =

Louise Payson Latimer (1878–1962) was an American librarian and writer. She created the D.C. Public Library's Illustrator Collection; and presided over the 1927 Newbery Award.

== Biography ==
Louise Payson Latimer was originally from Charles Town, West Virginia. She graduated from Stephenson Seminary in 1896.

She served as Director of Work with Children at the District of Columbia Public Library from 1919 to 1948. She was the third and longest-serving leader of children's services in DC.

Latimer had a decades-long interest in and dedication to gathering and documenting information pertaining to children's book illustrations. She created the D.C. Public Library's Illustrator Collection to address requests for visual material and to preserve works that might otherwise be damaged by young readers. The collection now consists of more than 20,000 primarily 19th- and 20-century British and American books, many of them first editions. In 1948, a large assortment of 18th- and 19th-century works belonging to the late Newbery Medal winner Rachel Field were donated to the collection.

Latimer was well respected nationally and presided over the 1927 Newbery Award. In 1929 she made national headlines for refusing to add the books of Father Francis J. Finn to the D.C. Public Library's collections, as she determined that they lacked literary merit.

== Published works ==
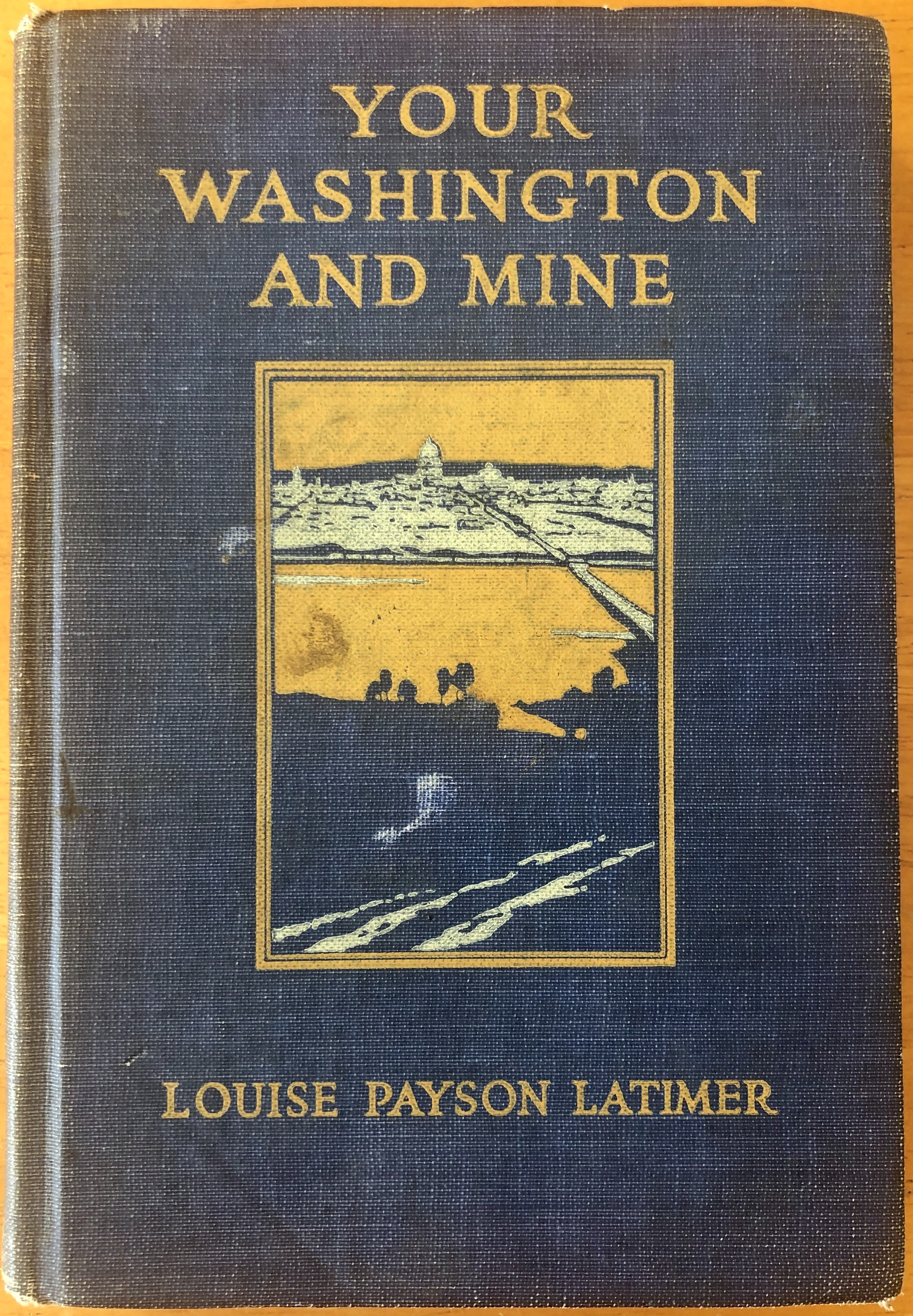
Cover of the book "Your Washington and Mine" by Louise Payson Latimer

Your Washington and Mine (Charles Scribner's Sons, 1924) details the story of Washington, D.C. from the nation's founding into the early twentieth century. Written in response to requests from teachers for a book geared toward young people about the nation's capitol, the book covers not only the federal aspects of D.C.'s history, it also describes daily life in Washington including topics such as parks and city services. One of the book's chapters, "Political Servitude of Residents," addresses political representation and suffrage of District residents, a topic still actively under debate in 21st-century Washington.

Illustrators, A Finding List (Faxon, 1927) was an inventory of illustrators of children's books. Originally compiled in 1919 to help individuals seeking visual information at the library, the list was updated and formally published in 1927.

The Organization and Philosophy of the Children's Department of One Public Library (Faxon, 1935) outlines best practices for library organization and management, and was the first of its kind on this topic.

Illustrators of Children's Books, 1744-1945 (Horn Book, 1947), a 527-page collaborative work by Latimer, Bertha E. Mahony and Beulah Folmsbee, catalogs illustrators of children's books over two centuries. Latimer's primary contribution is a bibliography of over 800 illustrators and an author index. This four-volume set has been called "a landmark in the story of bookmaking."
