= Jennifer Abod =

American feminist activist, musician and journalist (born 1946)

- Born: 1946 (age 78–79)
- Citizenship: American
- Occupations: Feminist activist; Musician; Journalist
- Notable work: The Liberation of Lydia (radio soap opera, 1970)
- Relatives: Susan Abod (sister)

Jennifer Abod (born 1946) is an American feminist activist, musician, journalist, and filmmaker.

== Education ==
Jennifer Abod is the sister of feminist activist Susan Abod. She obtained her Bachelor of Science from Southern Illinois University, her Master of Science from Southern Connecticut State University, and her Ph.D. Intercultural Media Education from Union Institute and University.

== Feminist Work ==
Abod was a co-founder and the singer of the New Haven Women's Liberation Rock Band Papa Don't Lay that Shit on Me from 1970 until 1976. The highly political band played, once, in front of the White House during a women's liberation march, and at Niantic State Prison, where Erica Huggins was imprisoned. The group also recorded with the Chicago Women's Liberation Rock Band. Her voice was described as "a deep blue voice she could have taken to Hollywood," by Naomi Weisstein.

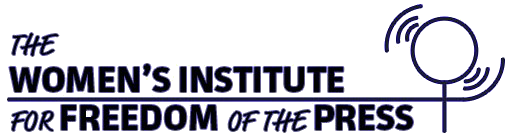
The Women's Institute for Freedom of the Press logo. Abod became associate of the organization in 1985.

In 1972, Ms. published "Feminist Rock: No More Balls and Chains," which Abod contributed to, along with Virginia Blaisdell and Naomi Weisstein. She also co-wrote "The Liberation of Lydia," the first feminist radio soap opera in 1970. She was a radio broadcaster for 19 years and was the first woman in Connecticut to host a nightly AM talk radio program, "The Jennifer Abod Show," which ran from 1977 until 1980. In 1985, Abod became an associate of the Women's Institute for Freedom of the Press (WIFP).

Abod would go on to co-found Women's Health Advocates, and along with Esta Soler and Laura Ponsor Sporazzi, she interviewed women in drug treatment programs in the Northeast. This program evaluated the treatment of women in these facilities, and were published in a report, "The ABC's of Drug Treatment for Women," in 1976. In 1988, she formed her own production company, Profile Productions, which produced and distributed media relating to feminist activists and cultural workers. Her first documentary was released in 2002, titled "The Edge of Each Other's Battles: The Vision of Audre Lorde."

Abod's personal archive is in the collection of the Sophia Smith Collection at Smith College.

== Filmography ==
Year	Title	Description
2002	The Edge of Each Others Battles: The Vision of Audre Lorde	This film is a tribute to the legacy of politics and poetry left behind by Audre Lorde. Footage from the four-day Boston conference "I Am Your Sisters" is included along with intercuts of interviews with organizers/scholars Jacqui Alexander and Angela Bowen. It expresses an passion of activism that is lifelong and joyous.
2007	Look us in the Eye: The Old Women's Project	Cynthia Rich, Mannie Garza, and Janice Keaffaber are the 3 founders of The Old Women's Project. They decided to focus on combating ageism after 10 years of political activism together. The film shows their many techniques against the contempt and invisibility that old women experience every day.
2016	The Passionate Pursuits of Angela Bowen	Angela Bowen is a colored girl in inner city Boston during the time of the Jim Crow laws. While running a dance school, she makes a discovery which leads her to desire a different life in a new city and discover her true identity. Her decisions and strategies for survival are influenced by challenges presented to her that deal with race, class, gender, age, and sexuality.
2017	Nice Chinese Girls Don't: Kitty Tsui	Kitty Tsui is a Chinese American artist, activist, writer, poet, and body builder. This film focuses on her life as an immigrant amidst the anti-Vietnam war protests in the 1970s and her life now.

== See also ==
- List of female film and television directors
- List of LGBT-related films directed by women
