= Angela Bowen =

American academic, writer, and lesbian rights activist (1936–2018)

- Born: February 6, 1936; Boston, Massachusetts, U.S.
- Died: July 12, 2018 (aged 82); Long Beach, California, U.S.
- Education: University of Massachusetts Boston; Clark University
- Occupations: Professor, activist, writer
- Employer: California State University, Long Beach
- Spouses: Ken Peters; Jennifer Lynn Abod
- Children: 3

Angela Bowen (February 6, 1936 – July 12, 2018) was an American dance teacher, English professor, writer, and a lesbian rights activist. She was also the subject of an award-winning 2016 documentary.

== Early life ==
Bowen was born on February 6, 1936, in Boston, Massachusetts in an African-American family. She was the sixth of seven children. She lost her father at the age of 2. Bowen trained and taught at the Elma Lewis School of Fine Arts in Roxbury from age 14 to 22.

Bowen graduated in 1992 from the College of Public and Community Service at University of Massachusetts Boston, where she earned a bachelor's degree in Human Services. She earned a master's degree and a Ph.D. degree from Clark University, where she wrote the first dissertation about Audre Lorde: "Who Said it was Simple: Audre Lorde's Complex Connections to Three U.S. Liberation Movements, 1952–1992". The final chapter, "All These Liberations", is included in The Wind is Spirit: The Life, Love, and Legacy of Audre Lorde, a Lambda Literary Award winning bio/anthology by Gloria Joseph. Bowen's doctorate was, in 1997, one of the first granted in women's studies in the United States.

== Career ==
Bowen co-founded the Bowen/Peters School of Dance with her then husband, drummer Ken Peters, in New Haven, Connecticut, in 1963. The school closed in 1982. After this, Bowen and Peters divorced and she came out as a lesbian. Bowen became a gay rights activist and served on the board of the National Coalition of Black Lesbians and Gays. She eventually became the co-chair of the organization and served as the editor of the group's magazine. Bowen appeared on a number of television and radio programs, including WBZ-TV and BET to speak about gay rights and feminism.

After receiving her doctorate, Bowen became a professor of English and Women's Studies at California State University, Long Beach (CSULB). She was the first Black woman to join the staff of the Women's Studies department at CSULB in the program's thirty-year history. She remained involved with activism while she taught and was the keynote speaker at CSULB's first Lavender Graduation ceremony.

Bowen was the subject of the 2016 documentary The Passionate Pursuits of Angela Bowen by her partner Dr. Jennifer Abod and Mary Duprey. It won Best Documentary in the "Women's History U.S." category at the 2017 To the Contrary About Women and Girls film festival. Jennifer Abod described the documentary as "important". She said: "In the canon of documentary films, stories exploring the complexities of Black women's lives are rarely told: Black feminists are seldom heard nor seen, and Black lesbians are practically invisible. This film is important to anyone who wants to know more about the history of dance and the emergence of the Black LGBTQ movement. Her story inspires anyone interested in trying to be their authentic self, and challenges us to recognize and appreciate how race, class, gender, age, and sexuality can inform decisions and strategies for survival."

Bowen's activism transcended her professional life. In 1987, after Bowen and Abod embarked on a cruise sold to them under the label "Sapphic sailing" only to discover the ship was populated with only heterosexual families and their children, the couple penned an article in Gay Community News, in which they complained that "A heterosexual world we had sought to leave behind was locked up with us on a ship cruising to Bermuda", recounting experiences of homophobia from the trip. In 1989, Bowen joined several community leaders who walked out of a fundraising performance for a Boston health clinic that served gay and lesbian clients after two white comedians told racist jokes.

In addition to being subject of books and documentaries, Bowen was an accomplished writer in her life. As well as her academic writings, she was also a contributor to Gay Community News. In 2017, Bowen was honored for her work and activism by the Astraea Lesbian Foundation for Justice with their Acey Social Justice Feminist Award. The award is given to lesbian, queer or trans people over the age of sixty-two in recognition for their activism and contributions to their respective communities. When Bowen died in 2018, she left a rich archive that had been collected and preserved by Abod. The archive has been donated to Spelman College, which also holds Lorde's archive.

== Personal life and death ==
Bowen married first Ken Peters in the 1960s; they had three children. They divorced in the 1980s, when she came out as a lesbian. Bowen met Jennifer Abod at a Take Back the Night rally in New Haven in 1979. Jennifer Abod said of their meeting: "I first saw Angela in July 1979 in New Haven, Connecticut. She was a speaker at rally after a citywide candle-lit Take Back the Night march protesting violence against women." They married in 2013. She had Alzheimer's disease.

Bowen died on July 12, 2018, in Long Beach, California, aged 82. She is survived by her two sisters, Alphena Bowen Clark and Catherine Bowen Tyler; her children with Ken Peters, Ntombi A. Peters and Jomo K. Peters; her stepdaughter, Elaine Peters; her foster daughter, Sharon Smith; and a granddaughter.
