= Minnesota Women's Press =

American feminist monthly magazine

- Cover by Carla Rodriguez in September 2020
- Editor/Publisher: Mikki Morrissette
- Categories: Feminism
- Frequency: Monthly
- Total circulation: 35,000
- Founded: April 1985; 41 years ago
- First issue: April 1985
- Company: Minnesota Women's Press LLC
- Country: United States
- Based in: Minneapolis
- Language: English
- Website: www.womenspress.com
- ISSN: 1085-2603

Minnesota Women's Press is an American feminist monthly magazine founded in 1985, and as such is one of the oldest continuously published feminist platforms in the US. Since 2017, it is published by Mikki Morrissette.

== History ==
Begun in 1984 by Mollie Hoben and Glenda Martin as a biweekly newspaper and launched on April 16, 1985, the publication became a monthly magazine in 2009 under former owners Norma Smith Olson and Kathy Magnuson. On December 14, 2017, Mikki Morrissette purchased the magazine and serves as the publisher and editor.

== Editorial content ==
The magazine publishes articles about women and nonbinary people living and working in Minnesota, and areas of focus include politics, reproductive rights, business, philanthropy, education, and culture.

== Awards ==
Minnesota Women's Press won several awards in the Minnesota Newspaper Association's 2023-2024 Better Newspaper Contest in the categories of "best magazine article," "human interest story," "best magazine photography," and "photography portrait and personality." In 2024, the magazine received DomesticShelters.org's Purple Ribbon Award in the category of "outstanding awareness event or campaign" for its coverage of gender-based violence.

== Other projects ==
- The book 35 Years of Minnesota Women was published in 2020 to commemorate the magazine's 35th anniversary and sold out its first edition.
- A Minnesota Women's Directory is published annually.

== See also ==
- List of feminist literature
- List of American feminist literature
