= Susan Abod =

American feminist activist and musician

Susan Gayle Abod
- Origin: Santa Fe, New Mexico, United States
- Occupations: Musician; Activist; Concert promoter
- Instruments: Vocals; Bass guitar
- Formerly of: Chicago Women's Liberation Rock Band
- Website: www.susanabod.com

Susan Gayle Abod is an American feminist activist and musician.

== Early life and education ==
Abod is the sister of fellow activist and musician, Jennifer Abod. she has a degree in music composition from DePaul University, and also studied at the Old Town School of Folk Music in Chicago.

== Career ==
Abod was a member of the Chicago Women's Liberation Rock Band, serving as lead singer, songwriter and bass player. She would become a music concert promoter, having attended events such as the Champaign Women's Music Festival, after which she went on to produce women's only music concerts in the Chicago-area. She would serve as the music engineer for Casse Culver's 3 Gypsies album in 1976 and two albums by Willie Tyson: Debutante (1977) and Tyson's self-titled album (1979). She also performed with Betsy Rose. She'd perform with Tyson and Robin Flowers at the Michigan Womyn's Festival, and would tour the United States. By 1982 she had completed a solo tour of Europe, where she sang in women's crisis centers, bookstores, shelters and nightclubs focused around women.

In the early 1980s she moved to Cambridge, Massachusetts. Abod would eventually be diagnosed with Chronic Fatigue Immune Dysfunction Syndrome and told she had multiple chemical sensitivity, an unrecognized controversial diagnosis characterized by chronic symptoms attributed to exposure to low levels of commonly used chemicals, in 1986. Despite health struggles, she continued to make music. She'd go on to create an hour-long documentary about her and other women's illnesses, titled "Funny You Don't Look Sick: Autobiography of an Illness". The documentary was completed in three years and the premier was held at the Museum of Fine Arts, Boston in 1995.

In 2004, she produced and recorded a solo CD of her original music, for which was nominated for an Outmusic award for Best Female Debut CD.

== Personal life ==
She lives and works in Santa Fe, New Mexico.
