= Casse Culver =

American musician (1944–2019)

- Karen "Casse" Culver, from the 1964 yearbook of St. Mary's College of Maryland
- Born: Karen Culver; March 7, 1944; Bethesda, Maryland, U.S.
- Died: December 4, 2019 (age 75); Milton, Delaware, U.S.
- Occupations: Singer, songwriter
- Spouse: Boden Sandstrom

Karen Sue "Casse" Culver (March 7, 1944 – December 4, 2019) was an American folk singer and songwriter in the women's music genre.

== Early life and education ==
Culver was born in Bethesda, Maryland, the daughter of Ronald H. Culver and Thyra Marjorie Ferguson Culver. Her father was an electrical engineer and her mother was a beautician. She attended St. Mary's College of Maryland. In the 1980s, she took a course of Bible study at the Way of Faith Christian Institute in Virginia. Her older brother Donald M. Culver was president of the Gay Restaurant Owners of Washington.

== Career ==
Culver began singing and playing guitar as a busker in the late 1960s. She had a record contract in 1971, and recorded an unreleased album. Culver played her "very personal, folk-sounding music" at women's music festivals, and toured nationally in the 1970s. Susan Abod performed with Culver in concerts, and on Culver's album 3 Gypsies (1976). She and Boden Sandstrom began a sound company, Woman Sound, in 1975.

Beyond music, Culver was an organic gardener in Woodstock, New York, in the late 1960s, and ran a garden and landscaping service in the 1980s. She enjoyed doing home renovation projects, and was a house manager for a group home in Washington, D.C. In the 1980s, she taught at a church, Hear and Be Healed Ministries, and was known as "the Rev. Elder Casse Culver" by the early 1990s.

== Publications and recordings ==
- Casse Culver Songbook
- 3 Gypsies (1976 LP)
- "What We Gonna Do (About Anita)"/"Queen of the Night" (1978 single)
- Songs and Other Dreams (1982 LP)
- "Ride, Sally Ride!"/"Blame it on the Moon" (1982 single)
- Casse Culver Live in Concert (1984 cassette, recorded in 1974)
- "Perfect Child of God" (2018, poem)

== Personal life ==
Culver married Boden Sandstrom in 2013, but they were together "on and off" from the mid-1970s. Culver died from lung cancer in 2019, at the age of 75, in Milton, Delaware. There is a large collection of her papers in the Sophia Smith Collection of Women's History at Smith College. There is a recording of Casse Culver and Willie Tyson performing in 1976 on WBAI in New York, in the Pacifica Radio Archives.
