= Carolyn Steedman =

British historian (born 1947)

Carolyn Kay Steedman, FBA (born 20 March 1947) is a British historian, specialising in the social and cultural history of modern Britain and exploring labour, gender, class, language and childhood. Since 2013, she has been Emeritus Professor of History at University of Warwick, where she had previously been a Professor of History since 1999.

She's recognized for her work on the concept of archives--particularly the way she responds to Jacques Derrida's idea of the archive.

== Career ==
Steedman graduated from the University of Sussex with an undergraduate degree in English and American Studies in 1968, and then completed a master's degree at Newnham College, Cambridge, in 1974.

She was a teacher from then until 1982, when she joined the Institute of Education in the University of London as a researcher; for the 1983–84 year, she was a Fellow there, before lecturing at the University of Warwick, where she was appointed Senior Lecturer in 1988, Reader in 1991 and Professor of Social History in 1995. For the year 1998–99, she was Director of Warwick's Centre for Study of Social History. Steedman returned to Newnham College to complete her doctorate, which was awarded in 1989.

== Honours ==
In 2011, Steedman was elected a Fellow of the British Academy (FBA), the United Kingdom's national academy for the humanities and social sciences.

== Selected works ==
- The Tidy House (London: Virago, 1982).
- Policing the Victorian Community (London: Routledge & Kegan Paul, 1984).
- (Edited with Cathy Urwin and Valerie Walkerdine) Language, Gender and Childhood (London: Routledge & Kegan Paul, 1985).
- Landscape for a Good Woman (London: Virago, 1986).
- The Radical Soldier's Tale: John Pearman, 1819-1908 (London: Routledge, 1988).
- Margaret McMillan. Childhood, Culture and Class in Britain (London: Virago, 1990).
- Past Tenses. Essays on Writing, Autobiography and History (London: Rivers Oram, 1992).
- Strange Dislocations. Childhood and the Idea of Human Interiority, 1780–1930 (London: Virago, 1995).
- Dust (Manchester: Manchester University Press, 2001).
- Master and Servant. Love and Labour in the English Industrial Age (Cambridge: Cambridge University Press, 2007).
- Labours Lost. Domestic Service and the Making of Modern England (Cambridge: Cambridge University Press, 2009).
- An Everyday Life of the English Working Class. Work, Self, and Sociability in the Early Nineteenth Century (Cambridge: Cambridge University Press, 2013).
- The Radical Soldier's Tale. John Pearman, 1819–1908 (London: Routledge, 2016).
