= The Passionate Pursuits of Angela Bowen =

Biographical documentary film about Angela Bowen

- Directed by: Jennifer Abod; Mary Duprey
- Written by: Jennifer Abod
- Release date: 2016
- Running time: 73 minutes
- Country: United States

The Passionate Pursuits of Angela Bowen is a 2016 biographical documentary film by Jennifer Abod and Mary Duprey, depicting the life of Angela Bowen. Bowen grew up in Boston during the Jim Crow era, and grew up to become a classical ballerina, a noted dance teacher, a black lesbian feminist activist, a writer and a professor at Cal State Long Beach.

== Synopsis ==
The film looks into the life of Angela Bowen (1936–2018), who was a black lesbian feminist activist, a classical ballerina and renowned dance teacher, and ultimately a professor in the California State University system. Her activism was equally strong in all aspects of her life – she was as impassioned in her advocacy for the arts as she was for LGBTQI rights, which she championed as strongly as she did black women's rights.

The Passionate Pursuits follows Bowen's life from her childhood as a black girl in inner-city Boston during the Jim Crow era across the decades, until she became a legendary figure in her pursuits as a teacher, writer, feminist and activist. The film includes historic footage, photographs and interviews with key people from her past, such as her dance mentor, her dance partner, her former husband, her children, activists, and scholars. Interwoven throughout the film's narrative is the recognition of how race, class, gender and sexuality influenced her, and played into her choices and her survival strategies.

== Production ==
Director Jennifer Abod, who is a radio personality, musician, feminist activist and journalist, first met Angela Bowen in 1979. The two became life partners, eventually marrying in 2013, after more than 30 years together. Abod began making The Passionate Pursuits in 2000, at the onset of Bowen's Alzheimer's disease, in an effort to capture and share the extraordinary life of a woman whose passion and brilliance had pushed beyond the oppressive barriers of sexism and racism.

In 2014, Abod launched a crowdfunding project on Indiegogo, donations drive project to fund the film, fueled by orders of her film and book, The Old Women’s Project.

== Reception ==
The Passionate Pursuits of Angela Bowen met with positive reviews, and garnered several awards.

Beverly Guy-Sheftall, Professor of Women's Studies at Spelman College, wrote in a review of the film: "'Passionate Pursuits' is a compelling portrait of an important figure in the evolution of contemporary Black feminist history in the United States. The extraordinary life of Angela Bowen—dancer, writer, scholar, activist, professor—provides a window on important aspects of 20th century African American history, women's history and LGBTQ history." Dee Jay Cox, in a review for CV Weekly, opined that "The Passionate Pursuits of Angela Bowen will inspire audiences to pursue their dreams with tenacity and courage."

== Awards ==
Year	Award	Category	Nominee	Result
2018	Some Prefer Cake	Viewers Choice – Best Documentary	The Passionate Pursuits of Angela Bowen	Won
2018	Clarion Awards	Television Documentary Program - Local or Regional	The Passionate Pursuits of Angela Bowen	Won
2018	Milan International Lesbian and Gay Film Festival	Best Documentary	The Passionate Pursuits of Angela Bowen	Won
2018	The Astraea Lesbian Foundation for Justice	Acey Social Justice Feminist Award	Jennifer Abod	Won
2018	Black International Cinema, Berlin	Best Documentary Film on the Black Experience	The Passionate Pursuits of Angela Bowen	Won
2018	Cinema Systers Film Festival	Best Documentary, Audience Choice Award	The Passionate Pursuits of Angela Bowen	Won
2018	PBS To the Contrary Film Festival	Best Television Documentary Program	The Passionate Pursuits of Angela Bowen	Won
2018	PBS To the Contrary Film Festival	Best US History Documentary	The Passionate Pursuits of Angela Bowen	Won
2018	Tampa Bay Gay & Lesbian Film Festival	Jury Award (runner up)	The Passionate Pursuits of Angela Bowen	Nominated
2018	Nhdocs - The New Haven Documentary Film Festival	Audience Award, Best Feature Film	The Passionate Pursuits of Angela Bowen	Won
2018	Sky TV-laF	Mix Milano Award	The Passionate Pursuits of Angela Bowen	Won
2018	Tampa International Gay & Lesbian Film Festival	Audience Award for Best Documentary Film	The Passionate Pursuits of Angela Bowen	Won

=== Festival screenings ===
- London Feminist Film Festival
- Arts & Ideas Festival
- New Haven International Film Festival
- The Roxbury International Film Festival
- Outside the Frame: Radical Queer Film Festival
- Mix Film Festival, Milan
- North Carolina Gay/Lesbian Film Festival
- GayLesbioco E Queer Culture
- Green Salon Short Film Festival

== See also ==
- List of LGBT-related films directed by women
