= Chicago Women's Liberation Union =

American feminist organization

- Founded: 1969
- Dissolved: 1977
- Purpose: Women's liberation
- Location: Chicago, Illinois, United States

The Chicago Women's Liberation Union (CWLU) was an American feminist organization founded in 1969 at a conference in Palatine, Illinois.

The main goal of the organization was to end gender inequality and sexism, which the CWLU defined as "the systematic keeping down of women for the benefit of people in power." The purpose statement of the organization expressed that "Changing women's position in society isn't going to be easy. It's going to require changes in expectations, jobs, child care, and education. It's going to change the distribution of power over the rest of us to all people sharing power and sharing in the decisions that affect our lives." The CWLU spent almost a decade organizing to challenge both sexism and class oppression. The group is best known for the 1972 pamphlet "Socialist Feminism: A Strategy for the Women’s Movement", by the Hyde Park Chapter of the Chicago Women's Liberation Union (Heather Booth, Day Creamer, Susan Davis, Deb Dobbin, Robin Kaufman, and Tobey Klass). Nationally circulated, the publication is believed to be the first to use the term socialist feminism.

Naomi Weisstein, Vivian Rothstein, Heather Booth, and Ruth Surgal were among its founders. The play The Last of the Red Hot Mammas, or, the Liberation of Women as Performed by the Inmates of the World was first performed at its founding conference, and Naomi Weisstein was one of those who performed in the play on that occasion.

Vivian Rothstein was the CWLU's first staff member, organized its representative decision-making part, and aided the establishment of its Liberation School for Women.

== Chapters ==
Campus chapters in the CWLU included but were not limited to University of Illinois at Chicago (UIC), Loyola, Northwestern, Roosevelt, Harold Washington, and Dominican University. Local chapters in the CWLU functioned as semi-autonomous groups. These chapters served as consciousness raising groups or groups involved in the planning of political strategies. Some local chapters combined both. Local chapters included the Hyde Park Chapter, the Friday Night Chapter, Brazen Hussies, Mrs. O'Leary, and more. These chapters worked to develop and strengthen peoples' consciousness and skills, to provide free or inexpensive quality services for women, and to challenge politics through direct action.

The CWLU published outreach newspapers such as Womankind, Blazing Star, and Secret Storm. Womankind was a newspaper of the CWLU from 1971 to 1973. It was published monthly and focused on women who were curious about the liberation movement. The CWLU wanted to spread their ideas, inform others of the political direction of the Union, and increase awareness of their chapters and programs. Blazing Star was a newspaper published in 1975 that focused on the struggles and discrimination lesbians faced. The Lesbian Group of CWLU took on this newspaper's title and was also known as Blazing Star.

Secret Storm was another newspaper published by a CWLU group of the same name. Formerly known as Outreach, Secret Storm reflected their ideas and thoughts via their newspaper. They raised controversial yet critical points and discussed current, significant issues with women that they met through neighborhood projects. Secret Storm focused primarily on the problematic structure of neighborhoods and the inequality women encountered in the workplace. Their involvement with issues of sexism, oppression, and inequality ranged from promoting women's sport leagues to helping women understand issues on a global scale. They fought against sexism in park districts and neighborhoods. They worked hard to educate women on prevalent issues apart from their personal experiences. They presented the idea of a global connection shared between women, rather than just a local connection.

Some groups within the CWLU focused specifically on women's involvement in music and the arts. The Chicago Women's Graphics Collective was first organized in 1970 to provide high quality feminist posters for the growing women's liberation movement and to encourage women in the arts. The Chicago Women's Graphics Collective originally used silkscreen to create their large brilliantly colored prints because it was inexpensive and posters could be produced in member's apartments. The Chicago Women's Liberation Rock Band was formed in 1972 and focused on women expressing themselves through their musical talents.

== Programs and groups ==
The CWLU was organized as an umbrella organization to unite a wide range of work groups and discussion groups. A representative from each work group went to monthly meetings of the Steering Committee to reach consensus on organizational policy and strategy. They addressed a myriad of issues including women's health, reproductive rights, education, economic rights, visual arts and music, sports, lesbian liberation, and much more.

=== Education ===
A large portion of CWLU's work revolved around education. With the help of Vivian Rothstein, the organization established its Liberation School for Women in 1970. The Liberation School, among other projects, served as a gateway to more opportunities for women. The Liberation School taught women practical and technological skills such as producing low priced political art or running pregnancy tests. This was very beneficial because many women did not have any previous involvement or experience with organizations. Many women learned skills that they would later bring to the political world. Their political fight for antiracism, disability rights, labor community and reproductive rights would help women strengthen their status in society. The Prison Project taught classes at the Dwight Correctional Center for five years. They helped improve facility conditions and organized family visitation rights. When the Prison Project first started its work, there were many strikes and revolts that often resulted in death and injury. However, to deal with the brutal conditions at Dwight, the Prison Project taught classes in health and law. As a result of their efforts, the Illinois Department of Children and Family Services and the Illinois Department of Corrections created a space for women within the institution that included a nursery room. This was much more conducive for the interactions between women and their children.

=== Healthcare ===
Healthcare, especially reproductive medical services, was a major concern for CWLU. Groups such as the underground Abortion Counseling Service (also referred to as "Jane" or "Jane Collective") formed within the organization to raise awareness and create change in the health system. The organization provided abortion referrals and clandestine abortions. When abortion was legalized, the Abortion Counseling Service fought for access and safety at clinics while providing affordable pregnancy tests. The Health Evaluation and Referral Service (HERS) was a watchdog group overseeing healthcare professionals and provided referrals until 1989.

=== Social and political issues ===
The CWLU did not participate in electoral politics, instead work groups took on the city government to advocate for women's rights. Together with the Chicago chapter of the National Organization for Women (NOW), the CWLU work group DARE (Direct Action for Rights in Employment) sued the city and eventually won a major sex discrimination wage case on behalf of city women custodians. The Action Coalition for Decent Childcare (ACDC), organized by members of the CWLU, fought for and won the case for changing licensing codes for day care providers. CWLU also had a Legal Clinic that provided advice and services. The majority of CWLU members were Caucasian, however they took part in health work for Latino communities, fought against racial discrimination in gay and lesbian bars, and had many affiliations with diverse groups.

The CWLU believed that a developing working-class was fundamental in the ability to transform American society. The CWLU started using the word socialist feminism in order to provoke consciousness of the gender inequality during that time period where patriarchy was dominant in all aspects of society. For example, socialist feminist wanted to integrate the recognition of sex discrimination with their work to achieve justice, equality for women, working classes, the poor and all humanity. The DARE program's focal point was to integrate women into the workforce. Due to factors such as gender discrimination, women were denied the opportunity for advancement in the workforce and were paid less than men for the same work. Susan Bates directed this particular organization that went on to publish a newspaper called Secret Storm. This newspaper publicized struggles at Stewart-Warner, Campbell's Soup, and other workplaces in and around Chicago. In these workplaces there was gender and racial discrimination visible through wage distribution and lack of promotions. At Campbell's Soup, women workers fought for plant-wide seniority and an end to dual seniority lists, both of which were discriminatory. DARE was influential in their efforts to end discrimination and inequality in the workplace.

The Anti-Rape Movement of the 1970s in Chicago provided an opportunity for women to feel empowered by generating change within institutions. In rape cases before the Anti-Rape Movement, hospitals that did admit rape victims were not sensitive to their needs and were often unskilled in gathering evidence for possible prosecution. When police gave credibility to the charge of rape, they often treated the situation without sincerity and did not take the victims seriously. The courts often assigned untrained, hurried prosecuting attorneys to the cases. Usually these attorneys did not help the victims seek the justice they deserved. The Rape Project started a rape crisis hotline, an innovation in the anti-rape movement, where victims could call to communicate with an advocate. These advocates were available to comfort the victims, to talk with them, aid them in hospital or police visits, and support them in all aspects of their process.

Blazing Star was a lesbian group that was part of the CWLU; they produced a newsletter also called Blazing Star.

== Projects ==
The CWLU worked on many different projects and movements in the short eight years that they were active. Some of these movements included the University of Illinois at Chicago's (UIC) women's studies program, which is still active today. The CWLU worked with a student and faculty group called the Circle Women's Liberation Union to form the Women's Studies program in 1972 to "make knowledge by, about, and for women in all fields accessible to students." HERS organized the Abortion Clinic Evaluation Project and they worked to "help women find decent and humane abortion services and help expose abortion providers who were doing a poor job." This project began after the Roe v. Wade decision in 1973, which legalized abortion. The CWLU realized that once abortion was legal they needed to make sure that women were able to receive safe and clean abortion services. The CWLU also worked with a Hispanic organization called CESA (Committee to End Sterilization Abuse.) They worked together to put an end to unnecessary sterilization of women.

== Affiliations ==
The CWLU partnered with countless organizations including The National Black Feminist Organization, Women Employed (WE), National Organization for Women (NOW), Operation PUSH, Mujeres Latinas en Accion, Midwest Academy, Black Panthers, Puerto Rican Socialist Party, and League of Women Voters. The CWLU worked with Chicago NOW on several projects including defense of the Abortion 7, the City Hall janitress campaign, and an economic justice march in 1974. A key founder of WE came from the CWLU and was a voice for Chicago's workingwomen. Operation PUSH and the CWLU worked together on the City Hall janitress campaign and the defense of Joan Little. Little was a black woman who killed a jail guard in self-defense when he tried to rape her. Mujeres Latinas en Accion and the CWLU worked to form the committee to End Sterilization Abuse. The League of Women Voters and the CWLU worked together on the City Hall janitress campaign against pay discrimination.

== End ==
Due to a lack of structure in the organization, the CWLU often struggled with factionalism and in 1976 a final conflict arose that brought the organization down. Two groups, the Two-Line paper authors and the Asian Women's Group, passed out leaflets at the 1976 International Women's Day Event that denounced many ideas of the CWLU. These groups argued over leadership roles in the CWLU and were purged from the organization after the event in 1976. Losing support, the remaining members voted on April 24, 1977, to end the organization altogether.
