= Marilyn Frye =

American feminist philosopher and professor (born 1941)

- Born: 1941 (age 84–85); Tulsa, Oklahoma, U.S.
- Education: Stanford University (BA); Cornell University (MA, PhD)

Marilyn Frye (born 1941) is an American philosopher and radical feminist theorist. She is known for her theories on sexism, racism, oppression, and sexuality. Her writings offer discussions of feminist topics, such as: white supremacy, male privilege, and gay and lesbian marginalization. Although she approaches the issues from the perspective of justice, she is also engaged with the metaphysics, epistemology, and moral psychology of social categories.

Frye is the author of The Politics of Reality (1983), a collection of nine essays which has become a "classic" of feminist philosophy. She is also a lesbian, and much of her work explores social categories—in particular, those based on race and gender.

== Education and career ==
Frye received a BA with honors in philosophy from Stanford University in 1963 and a PhD in philosophy at Cornell University in 1969. She wrote her dissertation, titled Meaning and Illocutionary Force, under the supervision of Max Black. Before going to Michigan State University in 1974, she taught in the philosophy department at the University of Pittsburgh. From 2003 until her retirement, Frye was University Distinguished Professor at Michigan State University; she also served as Associate Dean for Graduate Studies of the College of Arts and Letters. In 2008 she was the Phi Beta Kappa Romanell Lecturer.

=== Purple ===
Frye was the President and co-founder of Purple, a Michigan non-profit organization beginning in 2013. The organization was dissolved in 2023.

== Research and publications ==
=== Double bind ===
In her chapter entitled "Oppression" in the book Feminist Frontiers, Frye discusses the idea of the double bind in gender. This double bind refers to "situations in which options are reduced to a very few and all of them expose one to penalty, censure or deprivation". Frye applies this principle to gender and the dilemma women often face in her discussion of oppression. For example, it is neither socially acceptable for a woman to be sexually active nor for her to be sexually inactive and labelled a "man-hater" or "uptight". This absence of choice permeates so thoroughly into women's day-to-day life that even small things like how they choose to dress or talk are criticized. Frye acknowledges that men face issues as well, but differentiates the issues of men and women.

=== Birdcage analogy ===
The birdcage analogy is Frye's way of visualizing oppressive forces and the way they affect women. As Frye tells it, each individual barrier women face can be thought of as a single bar of a cage. The woman in this analogy is the stagnant bird. When looking at a singular bar, it appears that the bird has the ability to fly away. It is when the observer steps back that they would see multiple bars working together to keep the bird contained within the cage. The meaning of the analogy is that multiple barriers are interacting with each other to keep individual women oppressed.

=== Marriage ===
In a 2013 interview in Stance, an international undergraduate philosophy journal, Marilyn Frye stated that she was against the institution of marriage, citing its "terrible history in patriarchy". Frye called it "curious" that lesbians and gay men were fighting for the right to participate in historically patriarchal institutions such as marriage and the military. However, she ceded that the concrete benefits that come with such statuses should not be overlooked. She also mentioned the fear of some that gay marriage might "undermine and eventually destroy the institution of heterosexual marriage." Frye stated that she "hope[s] maybe they're right," as she is against the existence of the institution.

=== Intra-feminist critiques ===
Marilyn Frye has emphasized in the past her concern with disengagement among feminists. She critiques those who categorize themselves as "good feminists" in an attempt to maintain moderacy or avoid the more radical, controversial feminists. She also argues that feminists should consider and include the "feminist forbearers" and the "contexts" of their work when writing, in order to create a sort of vital "genealogy of feminist thought."

=== Race ===
Frye has written extensively on what it means to be white in her essays "On Being White" and "White Woman Feminist." In "White Woman Feminist," Frye states that despite a desire to fight systemic and institutional racism through "analysis and decision"- that is, identifying her role within a racist system and resisting it- she has come to realize that her "competence to do it [is] questionable." Frye argues that white women are not capable of accurately analyzing or making authentic decisions on racism, instead advocating for an acknowledgement of white helplessness. Furthermore, Frye writes that being white is not "a biological condition," but instead "being a member of a certain social/political category" which is "impossible to escape."

=== Female anger ===
In The Politics of Reality (1983), Frye makes the argument in her essay "A Note on Anger" that female anger exists only because women feel that they have been wronged. She points out that anger stems from a belief that you are in the right in an unjust situation. Frye also argues that "anger implies a claim to domain," meaning that women have a perceived right to be angry only when it is within their domain. She explains how domains of anger are often gendered in a way that affects a woman's ability to be taken seriously in many male-dominated spaces. For example, while a woman might be viewed as justified if she is angry at her children for misbehaving, she rarely seems that way when angry at a mechanic who maladjusted her carburetor. A field such as mechanics is viewed as being outside of a woman's domain, and thus female anger about the topic is often seen as ill-informed, irrational, or less valid.

== Awards and distinctions ==
- Frye was named Distinguished Woman Philosopher of the Year by the Society for Women in Philosophy in 2001.
- Frye was recognized with a Distinguished Faculty Award while working in the Department of Philosophy at Michigan State University in 2002.
- Frye was chosen as Phi Beta Kappa's Romanell Professor in Philosophy for 2007–2008. The annually-awarded Romanell Professorship "recognizes the recipient's distinguished achievement and substantial contribution to the public understanding of philosophy." Recipients of this award also offer a series of lectures open to the public; Frye's series was entitled "Kinds of People: Ontology and Politics."

== Bibliography ==
=== Books ===
- Frye, Marilyn (1983). The politics of reality: essays in feminist theory. Trumansburg, New York: Crossing Press. ISBN 9780895940995.
- Frye, Marilyn (1992). Willful virgin: essays in feminism, 1976-1992. Freedom, California: Crossing Press. ISBN 9780895945532.
- Frye, Marilyn; Hoagland, Sarah Lucia (2000). Feminist interpretations of Mary Daly. Re-reading the canon. University Park, Pennsylvania: Pennsylvania State University. ISBN 9780271020198.

=== Chapters in books ===
- "Categories and Dichotomies", Encyclopedia of Feminist Theories, ed., Loraine Code, NY: Routledge, (2000)
- "Essentialism/Ethnocentrism: The Failure of the Ontological Cure", Is Academic Feminism Dead? Theory in Practice, ed., the Center for Advanced Feminist Studies at the University of Minnesota, NYU Press, (2000)
- Frye, Marilyn (2005), "Oppression", in Cudd, Ann E.; Andreasen, Robin O. (eds.), Feminist theory: a philosophical anthology, Oxford, UK Malden, Massachusetts: Blackwell Pub, pp. 84–90, ISBN 9781405116619.
- Frye, Marilyn (2005), "Categories in distress", in Andrew, Barbara S.; Keller, Jean; Schwartzman, Lisa H. (eds.), Feminist interventions in ethics and politics: feminist ethics and social theory, Lanham, Maryland: Rowman & Littlefield Publishers, pp. 41–58, ISBN 9780742542693.

=== Journal articles ===
- "The Necessity of Differences: Constructing a Positive Category of Women," SIGNS: Journal of Women in Culture and Society, Vol.21, No.4, Summer (1996)
