= Vivian Rothstein =

Vivian Leburg Rothstein (born 1946) is a labor rights activist, feminist, and community organizer. She was instrumental in the civil rights movement and the peace movement. She also cofounded the Chicago Women's Liberation Union.

== Early life ==
Vivian Rothstein was born in Jamaica, Queens in 1946. Her parents divorced shortly after her birth, and, in 1952, Rothstein's mother moved Vivan and her sister with her to Los Angeles, California. Rothstein's mother was a German-Jewish World War II refugee and Holocaust survivor, and a bookkeeper at a dress shop. In Los Angeles, Rothstein attended Hollywood High School. She went on to attend University of California, Berkeley because she was attracted to the “political and social dynamism” that it offered.

== Activism ==
While at Berkeley, Rothstein worked as a tutor and lived in cooperative housing. She tutored students in Oakland, California which she has described as her “first real contact with the low-income Black community.” It was at Berkeley that she first became involved with the Civil Rights movement. In 1963, Rothstein participated in demonstrations organized by the Congress of Racial Equality (CORE). She took part in protests against two businesses, a market called Lucky's and a restaurant chain called Sambo's, for their discriminatory hiring practices. During her first year at Berkeley, she also took part in the Auto Row demonstration against a number of car retailers, for which she was arrested for the first time.

Rothstein has said that she was "tired of being just a participant who had to take orders from leadership without any say in decisions", and decided to become a Mississippi Freedom Summer volunteer in 1965. She has described wanting to do civil rights work in the South because she wanted to learn how to be an organizer who was involved with the community for whom she was advocating. While in Mississippi, Rothstein protested for school integration and voter registration.

Rothstein went on to do a considerable amount of community organizing work in Chicago, beginning with Students for a Democratic Society's Jobs or Income Now (JOIN) community organizing project.

Rothstein went to Vietnam in 1967, at age 21, with a group of other activists attempting to monitor the truth of government claims about where bombings were occurring and what kinds of weaponry were being used. The group was particularly concerned about the bombing of civilians. Upon her return to the United States, her passport was taken away, she was followed by Naval Intelligence in Chicago, and she lost two jobs. Rothstein went on to be a key organizer of the Jeannette Rankin Brigade, which organized the first national women's march in opposition to United States involvement in the Vietnam War in Washington, D.C. in 1968.

Rothstein has also done influential community and labor organizing work in Los Angeles. Rothstein was the executive director of the Ocean Park Community Center, a nonprofit organization in Santa Monica, California, with services for homeless adults, families, and battered women with children. She worked with the community-led union, Respect, at the LAX project, which worked to raise wages and ensure benefits for service workers at the Los Angeles airport . She has also directed organizing efforts by the Hotel Workers International Union in Los Angeles, and worked as deputy director and later as a consultant for the Los Angeles Alliance for a New Economy (LAANE). Rothstein's work with LAANE focused on living wage campaigns. She is currently a board member of the Clergy and Laity United for Economic Justice.

== Chicago Women’s Liberation Union and the Liberation School ==
Rothstein's work in Vietnam, where she met with the Vietnam Women's Union, inspired her to be a cofounder of the Chicago Women's Liberation Union (CWLU) in 1969, where she focused her efforts on working-class women. Rothstein was the CWLU's first staff member, organized its representative decision-making part, and aided the establishment of its Liberation School for Women.

The CWLU was an explicitly radical, anti-capitalist, and feminist organization that committed itself to creating a multi-issue women's liberation movement. Rothstein described the goals of CWLU in a speech in 2014: "We wanted to build a pluralistic, inviting, non-sectarian organization where different approaches to liberating women could exist side-by side". The CWLU attracted many leading feminists in Chicago, including Heather Booth, Naomi Weisstein, Estelle Carol, and Diane Horowitz.

The idea for the Liberation School for Women within the CWLU was conceived by Rothstein in response to the many women interested in getting involved in the CWLU. In her vision, a Liberation School would be a place where women could learn to free themselves from oppression. It offered introductory classes on topics such as Our Bodies, Ourselves, the history of the family, and women in literature, as well as skills classes, and study and action groups on topics like racism and women's politics and women and religion. Students of the Liberation School for Women were largely service workers, professionals in women-lead fields such as teaching and nursing, as well as students and homemakers. The Liberation School worked closely with the CWLU and was represented on the CWLU steering community, and helped to make decisions about the Union as a whole.

== Documentary ==
Rothstein is featured in the documentary She's Beautiful When She's Angry.
