= Lynne Hanley =

- Born: 1943 (age 82–83)
- Occupation: Professor
- Writing career
- Genres: Fiction; Literary criticism
- Notable work: Writing War: Fiction, Gender & Memory

Lynne Hanley (born 1943) is an American feminist author and literary critic. She is professor emerita of literature and writing at Hampshire College.

== Background ==
Hanley received a B.A. in English from Cornell University, an M.A. from Columbia University, and a Ph.D. from the University of California, Berkeley. Before coming to Hampshire, she taught at Princeton University, Douglass College and Mount Holyoke College.

== Publications ==
=== Select articles ===
- "Sleeping with the Enemy: Doris Lessing in the Century of Destruction" in The Columbia History of the British Novel. Richetti, John (ed.); Bender, John (assoc. ed.); David, Deirdre (assoc. ed.); Seidel, Michael (assoc. ed.). New York: Columbia UP, 1994: 918–38
- "To El Salvador" in Critical Responses in Arts and Letters, #8: The Critical Response to Joan Didion. Sharon Felton (ed.) Westport: Greenwood Press, 1993.
- "Mean Streak." Frontiers: A Journal of Women Studies, Vol. 14, No. 1, 1993: 93 -101.
- "Writing Across the Color Bar: Apartheid and Desire." In Massachusetts Review: A Quarterly of Literature, the Arts and Public Affairs, vol. 32, no. 4, pp. 495–506, Summer 1991
- "Alias Jane Somers." Doris Lessing Newsletter, vol. 12, no. 1, pp. 5–6, 14, Spring 1988.

=== Books ===
- (with Paul Jenkins). Running Into War. (forthcoming)
- Hanley, Lynne. Writing War: Fiction, Gender & Memory. Amherst: University of Massachusetts Press, 1991.
