= Writing War =

Writing War: Fiction, Gender, & Memory
- Author: Lynne Hanley
- Language: English
- Subject: Women authors War stories Literary criticism
- Published: 1991 (University of Massachusetts Press)
- Publication place: United States

Writing War: Fiction, Gender, & Memory is a 1991 text on women authors, war stories, and literary criticism by American professor Lynne Hanley.

== Overview ==
Hanley's text, which intertwines fiction, memoir, and literary criticism, examines women's war stories. She argues that fiction organizes, shapes, and ultimately creates perception, stating in her introduction that, "our fictions have power, they shape our memories of the past and they create memories of pasts we have never had, of experiences not even remotely like anything that has ever happened to us. And these narratives of exotic experiences may have the most power over us of all, because we can't challenge their authenticity with the evidence of our own senses." She thus begins her text with a critique of Paul Fussell's The Great War and Modern Memory (1975) as too narrow in its vision of war (focusing primarily on the experiences of male combatants). In contrast, through the juxtaposition of narrative and criticism (in particular, analysis of Virginia Woolf's Three Guineas and works by Joan Didion and Doris Lessing), Hanley offers portraits of women which she argues will "displace the soldier as the mouthpiece of war [...] the stories assume that women, children, noncombatants, and the enemy have an experience of war as much worth telling and remembering as is the story of any soldier."

== Reviews ==
B. Adler in Choice: Current Reviews for Academic Libraries argues that "Hanley's short stories, her war literature, cover the impact and aftermath of war. The stories movingly express fear, dislocation, monstrousness. Both essays and stories are accessible, a clear explication of an important feminist critical stance. Highly recommended." Arlene Kaplan Daniels in Signs notes that "Hanley's advisors warned her that mixed genres will not work. But this book does work. It is a beautifully written, thoughtful, combination of essays and stories about the effects of war on women and children [...] the essays and the stories are a pleasure to read. Combined they offer a wonderful antidote to the bellicosity and rejoicing in battle that often color the reminiscences found in war literature."
