= Landscape for a Good Woman =

1987 book by Carolyn Steedman

- Author: Carolyn Steedman
- Language: English
- Genre: Feminism
- Publisher: Rutgers University Press
- Publication date: October 1, 1987
- Publication place: United States
- Pages: 176 pp
- ISBN: 978-0813512587

Landscape for a Good Woman: A Story of Two Lives is a non-fiction book by British historian Carolyn Steedman, published by Rutgers University Press in 1987. The book is an autobiographical class analysis which looks at the author's working-class upbringing in UK (1950s London and 1920s Burnley),
