= The World Split Open =

2000 book

The World Split Open: How the Modern Women's Movement Changed America
- Author: Ruth Rosen
- Language: English
- Publication date: 2000
- Publication place: United States
- Media type: Print

The World Split Open: How the Modern Women's Movement Changed America (2000, revised edition 2006) is a book by American feminist historian Ruth Rosen that reviews the women's rights movement in the United States during the second half of the 20th century. Rosen discusses the way that the media framed the feminist movement and the reaction in society as women gained more influence.
