= Peggy Orenstein =

American writer

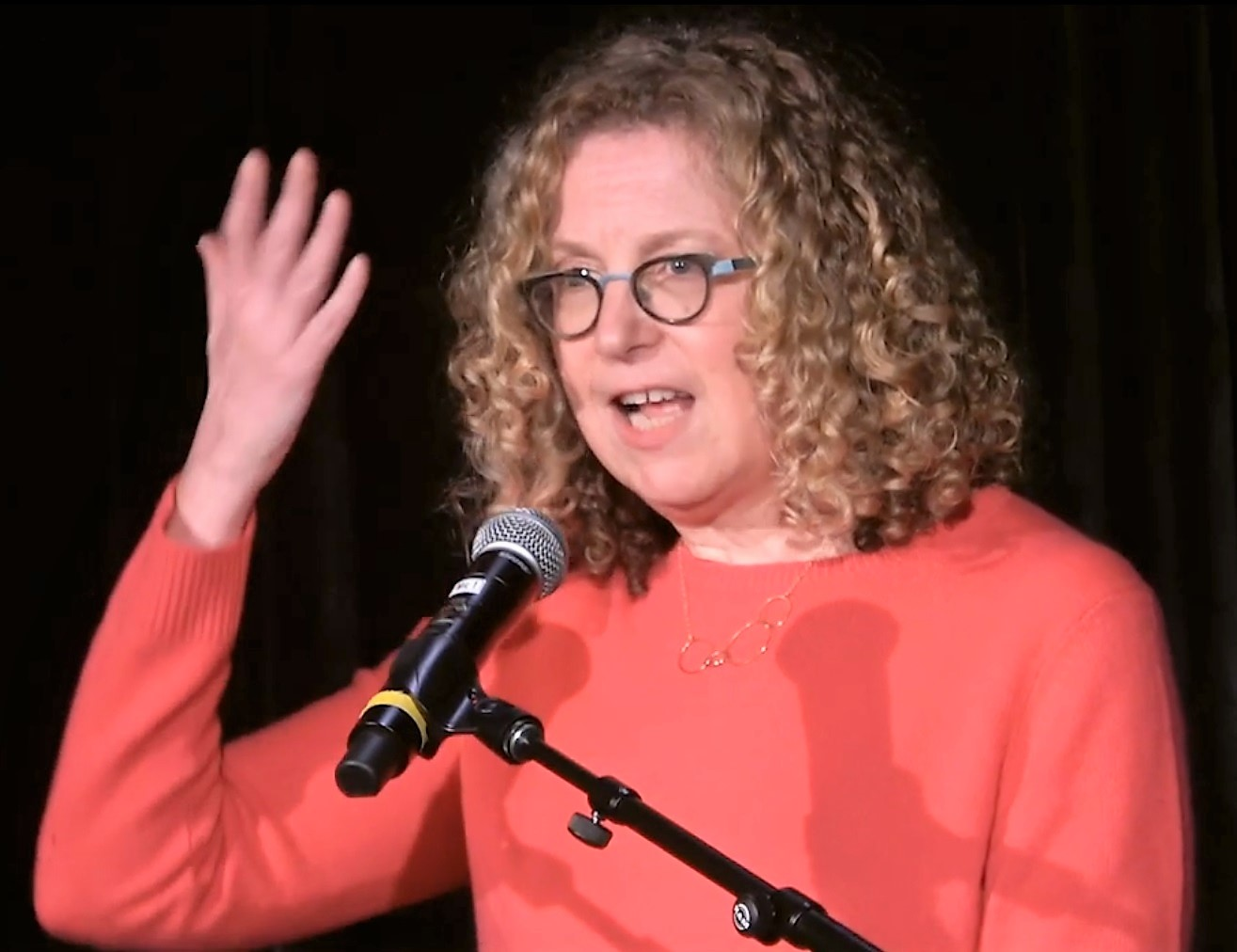
- Orenstein speaks on Boys & Sex at Town Hall Seattle in 2020
- Born: Minneapolis, Minnesota, U.S.
- Education: Oberlin College
- Spouse: Steven Okazaki (m. 1991)
- Writing career
- Genre: Non-fiction

Peggy Orenstein is an American writer on the politics of everyday life, usually relating to gender. Her books include Boys & Sex, Girls & Sex, Cinderella Ate My Daughter and Waiting for Daisy, as well as Unraveling, Don't Call Me Princess, Flux, and Schoolgirls. She is a frequent contributor to The New York Times.

== Writing ==
In books and magazine articles Orenstein writes about the politics of everyday life, usually relating to gender. Her book Schoolgirls discussed educational inequity. In Flux she explored the life choices of a generation of ethnically diverse, middle class women in their mid-20s to mid-40s. Waiting for Daisy was her memoir of infertility, cancer, and motherhood. In Cinderella Ate My Daughter, she exposed the "girlie girl" culture being marketed to young children. Girls & Sex and Boys & Sex described teenage sexual behavior, sexualized media, and hookup culture, calling for healthier, open dialogue between parents and children and expanded positive-based sex and relationship education in schools. She has also written about breast cancer and the limits of mammographic screening and early detection.

== Recognition ==
Orenstein has been named by the Columbia Journalism Review one of "40 women who changed the media business in the past 40 years". She has also been recognized by the Council on Contemporary Families for her "Outstanding Coverage of Family Diversity." She has received two "Books for a Better Life" awards. Her magazine work has also been honored by the Commonwealth Club of California, the National Women's Political Caucus of California, and Planned Parenthood Federation of America. She was the recipient of fellowships from the United States-Japan Foundation and the Asian Cultural Council. Orenstein was named in 2012 by The Columbia Journalism Review as one of its "40 Women Who Changed the Media Business in the Past 40 Years."

== Publications ==
- SchoolGirls: Young Women, Self-Esteem and the Confidence Gap. New York: Random House, 1994. ISBN 9780385425766, OCLC 475227709
- Flux: Women on Sex, Work, Kids, Love and Life in a Half-Changed World. New York: Anchor Books, 2001. ISBN 9780385498876, OCLC 473835765
- Waiting for Daisy. New York: Bloomsbury, 2007. ISBN 9781596912106, OCLC 192169835
- Cinderella Ate My Daughter. New York: Harper, 2012. ISBN 9780061711534, OCLC 808058076
- Girls & Sex. New York: Harper, 2016. ISBN 9780062209740, OCLC 974491998
- Don't Call Me Princess: Essays on Girls, Women, Sex, and Life. Harper Paperbacks, 2018. ISBN 978-0-06-268890-3, OCLC 1023574411
- Boys & Sex: Young Men on Hookups, Love, Porn, Consent, and Navigating the New Masculinity. 2020. ISBN 978-0062666970
- Unraveling: What I Learned About Life From Shearing Sheep, Dyeing Wool, and Making the World's Ugliest Sweater. Harper Paperbacks, 2024. ISBN 978-0063081734
