= Ruth Rosen =

Ruth Rosen is a historian of gender and society, a journalist, and a Professor Emerita at University of California, Davis.

She is the editor of The Maimie Papers, a New York Times Notable Book in 1978; the author of The Lost Sisterhood: Prostitution in America, 1982; and the author of The World Split Open: How the Modern Women's Movement Changed America (2000, revised edition 2006), a Book of the Month and Quality Paperback Selection; Los Angeles Times Best Books published in 2000; Finalist for Non-Fiction Award for Bay Area Reviewers Association.

She is Professor Emerita of History at the University of California, Davis, where she taught American history, women’s history, history and public policy, and immigration studies for over two decades. The recipient of the University of California Distinguished Teaching Award in 1983, and many national fellowships, including two from the Rockefeller Foundation, she has lectured all over the world and was a visiting professor at the European Peace University in Austria and Ireland, the Goldman School of Public Policy at U.C. Berkeley and is currently a visiting professor in the department of history at the University of California.

For her distinguished journalism, she received awards from the Society of Professional Journalists, the East Bay Press Club, the National Association for the Mentally Ill, the California Public Health Association, the National Federation of Women Legislators, and the Hearst Corporation.

She is featured in the feminist history film She's Beautiful When She's Angry.

== Education ==
- Ph.D History, University of California, Berkeley, 1976
- M.A. History of Art, University of California, Berkeley, 1969
- B.A. History Honors, University of Rochester, 1967
- Junior Year Abroad, Florence, Italy, 1965-1966
- Experiment in Living in Mexico, 1963
