= Reconstructing Womanhood =

1987 book by Hazel Carby

- Author: Hazel Carby
- Language: English
- Genre: Non-fiction
- Publication date: 1987
- Publication place: United States
- ISBN: 0-19-506071-7

Reconstructing Womanhood: The Emergence of the Afro-American Woman Novelist (ISBN 0-19-506071-7) is a book by Hazel Carby that was published in 1987. It documents the history of writing by American black women in the 1800s and early 1900s. It was positively received, being referred to as a landmark study and a groundbreaking work.

== Summary ==
Reconstructing Womanhood analyzes writings from black women in the nineteenth and early twentieth centuries, as well as examines the social, political, and historical landscapes in which these works were produced.

Carby describes the history and politics of American black women along with their writings. She writes about racial topics including the imagined danger of black men raping white women, the lynching of black people, racism from white women, black women's organizations, and white supremacy. The black women writers featured used their writing for social justice, but they were unable to accomplish their goals. The book covers the first century of writing by black women. Specifying by Susan Willis has been stated to be sort of a continuation of Reconstructing Womanhood due to Specifying covering the second century of black women authors. Willis's book deals with "contradiction and struggle" while Carby's book has to do with the "nationalist-capitalist system" and black women authors envisioning "social change". The book documents the history of writing by American black women in fiction, feminist writings, literary criticism, and their lives throughout the late 1800s and early 1900s. Other chapters detail the thoughts of black women having exotic sexuality and how black women were separated from white women in American politics. Writings that are discussed include Our Nig from 1859, Incidents in the Life of a Slave Girl in 1861, Iola Leroy in 1892, and Quicksand in 1928. Carby thinks that the novel Iola Leroy not being well received by literary scholars is an example of such writings from that time period being neglected. The last chapter details more modern fiction written by black women, while also focusing on individual writers. Carby argues that literature by American black women started a new "black womanhood" during the 1800s and that the 19th century was the "first writing renaissance" for those writers rather than the 1970s.

== Reception ==
Jewelle Gomez wrote in The Nation that Carby's "more formal style makes her book less accessible, but she does offer some important observations about the development of Afro-American women novelists." Angelo Costanzo of American Literature that "Carby convinces us that the time was rich with the voices of many women who were unafraid to express themselves in truthful and courageous ways". Alison Donnell wrote in her book Companion to Contemporary Black British Culture that Reconstructing Womanhood is Carby's "landmark study". Elizabeth Kowaleski-Wallac said in the Encyclopedia of Feminist Literary Theory that Reconstructing Womanhood is a "groundbreaking work".
