= Hazel Carby =

American academic (born 1948)

Hazel V. Carby
- Born: Hazel Vivian Carby; 15 January 1948 (age 78); Okehampton, Devon, UK
- Spouse: Michael Denning

Academic background
- Education: Portsmouth Polytechnic, London University, Birmingham University

Academic work
- Discipline: English
- Sub-discipline: African American studies, American studies
- Institutions: Wesleyan University, Yale University

Hazel Vivian Carby (born 15 January 1948 in Okehampton, Devon) is Professor Emerita of African American Studies and of American Studies. She served as Charles C. and Dorathea S. Dilley Professor of African American Studies and American Studies at Yale University.

== Early life and education ==
Hazel Carby was born to Jamaican and Welsh parents in Okehampton, Devon, UK, on 15 January 1948. She earned a BA degree in English and history from Portsmouth Polytechnic in 1970, then a PGCE in 1972, at the Institute of Education, London University. She taught high school from 1972 to 1979, then went back to university, at Birmingham University Centre for Contemporary Cultural Studies, where she gained a M.A (1979) and a Ph.D. (1984).

== Career ==
In 1981, Carby was appointed as a lecturer in the English Department at Yale University (1981–82), after which she taught English at Wesleyan University (1982–89), and rejoined Yale University in 1989. She is now Yale's Charles C. and Dorathea S. Dilley Professor of African American Studies and American Studies. Her teaching focuses on race, gender and sexuality in Caribbean and diasporic culture and literature; in transnational and postcolonial literature and theory; in representations of the black female body; and in genres of science fiction.

One of her contributions to African Diaspora studies came with her first book, Reconstructing Womanhood: The Emergence of the Afro-American Woman Novelist (1987). Reconstructing Womanhood offers studies on black female writers including Frances Ellen Watkins Harper, Pauline Elizabeth Hopkins, Anna Cooper, and Ida B. Wells, among others. Carby followed this book with Race Men: The Body and Soul of Race, Nation, and Manhood (1998), a six-essay collection of critiques on historical sites of black masculinity. Her first chapter, "Souls Of Black Men", is a critique of the gender bias in W. E. B. Du Bois' seminal work The Souls of Black Folk (1903). Carby argues that double consciousness is an erasure of Black female subjectivity. She does not question the importance of this text in black scholarship; she recognizes that because of the crucial status of Du Bois and Souls it is important that she undertakes this critique. After Race Men, she penned Cultures in Babylon: Black Britain and African America (1999).

In 2019 she published, to wide critical acclaim, an autobiographical account of the British Empire, entitled Imperial Intimacies : A Tale of Two Islands (2019). Carby has lectured at colleges and universities worldwide including the University of Notre Dame, Stanford University, the University of Paris, and the University of Toronto.

Carby serves on the advisory board of the academic journals Differences, New Formations and Signs.

== Awards and Honors ==
- 2016: Jay B. Hubbell Medal for lifetime achievement in American Literature - Modern Language Association.
- 2019: honorary Doctor of Letters, Wesleyan University
- 2019: Stuart Hall Outstanding Mentor Award, Caribbean Philosophical Association
- 2020: Nayef Al-Rodhan Prize for Global Cultural Understanding for Imperial Intimacies: A Tale of Two Islands (Verso).

== Personal life ==
Carby married fellow Yale professor Michael Denning on 29 May 1982.

== Bibliography ==
=== Books ===
- Multicultural Fictions, Birmingham: Centre for Contemporary Cultural Studies, University of Birmingham, 1980. ISBN 9780704405059, OCLC 35622246
- Reconstructing Womanhood: The Emergence of the Afro-American Woman Novelist. New York and Oxford: Oxford University Press, 1987. ISBN 9780195041644, OCLC 489583830
- Race Men: The W. E. B. Du Bois Lectures. Cambridge, Mass., and London: Harvard University Press, 1998. ISBN 9780674745582, OCLC 984382678
- Cultures in Babylon: Black Britain and African America. London and New York: Verso, 1999. ISBN 978-1859848845 OCLC 851741402
- Imperial Intimacies: A Tale of Two Islands. London: Verso, 2019. ISBN 9781788735094, OCLC 1099544754

=== Selected articles ===
- "Figuring the future in Los(t) Angeles". Comparative American Studies, 1.1 (2003): 19–34.
- "What is This 'Black' in Irish Popular Culture?" European Journal of Cultural Studies, 4.3 (2001): 325–349.
- "Can the Tactics of Cultural Integration Counter the Persistence of Political Apartheid? Or, The Multicultural Wars, Part Two". In Austin Sarat (ed.), Race, Law and Culture: Reflections on Brown v. Board of Education. New York: Oxford University Press, 1997. 221–28.
- "National Nightmares: The Liberal Bourgeoisie and Racial Anxiety". In Herbert W. Harris, Howard C. Blue and Ezra E. Griffith (eds), Racial and Ethnic Identity: Psychological Development and Creative Expression. New York: Routledge, 1995. 173–91.
- "Race and the Academy: Feminism and the Politics of Difference". In Isabel Caldeira (ed.), O Canone Nos Estudos Anglo-Americanos. Coimbra, Portugal: Livraria Minerva, 1994. 247–53.
- "'Hear My Voice, Ye Careless Daughters': Narratives of Slave and Free Women before Emancipation". In William L. Andrews (ed.), African American Autobiography: A Collection of Critical Essays. Englewood Cliffs, NJ: Prentice Hall, 1993. 59–76.
- "The Multicultural Wars". Radical History Review, 54.7 (1992): 7–18.
- "Imagining Black Men: The Politics of Cultural Identity". Yale Review, 80.3 (1992): 186–97.
- "Policing the Black Woman's Body in an Urban Context". Critical Inquiry, 18.4 (1992): 738–55.
- "The Politics of Fiction, Anthropology, and the Folk: Zora Neale Hurston". In Michael Awkward (ed.), New Essays on Their Eyes Were Watching God. Cambridge: Cambridge University Press, 1991. 71–93.
- "Re-inventing History/Imagining the Future". Black American Literature Forum, 20.2 (1989): 381–87.
- "Proletarian or Revolutionary Literature: C. L. R. James and the Politics of the Trinidadian Renaissance". South Atlantic Quarterly, 87 (1988): 39–52.
- "Ideologies of Black Folk: The Historical Novel of Slavery". In Deborah E. McDowell and Arnold Rampersad (eds), Slavery and the Literary Imagination. Baltimore, MD: Johns Hopkins University Press, 1989. 125–43.
- "The Canon: Civil War and Reconstruction". Michigan Quarterly Review. 28.1 (1989): 35–43.
- "It Jus Be's Dat Way Sometime: The Sexual Politics of Women's Blues". Radical America, 20 (1987): 9–22.
- "'On the Threshold of Woman's Era': Lynching, Empire, and Sexuality in Black Feminist Theory". Critical Inquiry, 12.1 (1985): 262–77.
- "Schooling in Babylon". The Empire Strikes Back: Race and Racism in Seventies Britain. London: Hutchinson, 1982. 182–211.
- "White Woman Listen! Black Feminism and the Boundaries of Sisterhood". The Empire Strikes Back: Race and Racism in Seventies Britain. London: Hutchinson, 1982. 212–235.

=== Other work ===
- "The Limits of Caste". London Review of Books. Vol. 43, No. 2 · 21 January 2021. Related interview for the LRB Podcast here.
