= Helen Mayer Hacker =

Sociologist and author

- Education: Columbia University
- Occupation(s): Sociologist and author
- Known for: Women's studies
- Notable work: Women as a Minority Group; The New Burdens of Masculinity

Helen Mayer Hacker is a sociologist, social activist, feminist and author. She is the first scholar to discuss women as a minority group.

== Life and education ==
Hacker was raised in Minneapolis. She was adopted by a Jewish family.

Hacker dropped out of high school and undertook classes at the University of Minnesota in the 1930s. She earned her PhD in sociology from Columbia University in 1961. Hacker wrote and taught about sociology. She retired from Adelphi University.

== Sociology ==
Hacker studied family, sexuality, gender and marginalized groups, and it paved the way to the exploration of new topics in sociology. Her fundamental contributions became a foundation of such studies in the discipline. Hacker explored social margins and was the first to classify women as a minority — she published Women as a Minority Group in 1951. By doing so, Hacker raised discussions like (1) The extent by which women can be classified as a minority group and (2) What would degendering be like, and whether the attainment of such would a desirable outcome. The work greatly contributed to second wave feminism.

Hacker established herself as a feminist sociologist onwards, although she faced struggles as a single and divorced woman as it was not socially acceptable as it is nowadays.

Hacker's second popular work, The New Burdens of Masculinity (1957) is a critical exploration of masculinity studies, which only became popular until the mid-1980s. In The New Burden of Masculinity, Hacker theorized the source of difficulties and the contradictions concerning masculinity — together with the ambiguity that emerged due to the changes brought by the contemporary times — for instance, through the increase of women in the workforce and its effects on long-held family dynamics. Hacker also scrutinized whether the erosion of traditional and dominant male status is the cause of several problems in the society, such as in the economic arena. It was later coined as mancession.

Women as a Minority Group and The New Burdens of Masculinity was cited many times by eminent gender scholars, including Arlie Hochschild and Joan Acker.

== Selected works ==
- Towards a Definition of Role Conflict in Modern Women (1949)
- Women as a Minority Group (1951)
- The New Burdens of Masculinity (1957)
- A Functional Approach to the Gainful Employment of Married Women (1961)
- The Feminine Protest of the Working Wife (1966)
- Sex Roles in Black Society: Caste Versus Caste (1972)
- Sexuality, Women's Liberation, and Sex Education (1974)
- Gender and Sex in Society (1975)
- The Social Roles of Women and Men: A Sociological Approach (1975)
- Women as a Minority Group: Twenty Years Later (1975)
