= Trude Weiss-Rosmarin =

German-American writer and educator

- Born: June 17, 1908; Frankfurt, Kingdom of Prussia, German Empire
- Died: June 26, 1989 (aged 81); Santa Monica, California, U.S.

Trude Weiss-Rosmarin (June 17, 1908 – June 26, 1989) was a German-American writer, editor, scholar, and feminist activist. With her husband, she co-founded the School of the Jewish Woman in New York City in 1933, and in 1939 founded the Jewish Spectator, a quarterly magazine, which she edited for 50 years.

She was the author of 12 books, including Judaism and Christianity: The differences (1943), Toward Jewish-Muslim Dialogue (1967), and Freedom and Jewish Women (1977).

== Early life ==
Weiss-Rosmarin was born in Frankfurt, Germany, the daughter of Jacob and Celestine (Mullings) Weiss. She attended the University of Berlin from 1927–28, and the University of Leipzig (1929), before obtaining her PhD in Semitics, philosophy, and archeology in 1931 from the University of Würzburg for a thesis on ancient Arab history. While at university, she became active in Jewish and Zionist organizations. She emigrated in 1931 with her husband, Aaron Rosmarin (born 1904), to the United States, where they settled in New York City. The couple divorced in 1951.

== Writing and teaching ==
Weiss-Rosmarin and her husband opened the School of the Jewish Woman in Manhattan in October 1933 under the auspices of Hadassah, the Women's Zionist Organization of America. The school, which closed in 1939, was modeled on the Frankfurt Lehrhaus created by Franz Rosenzweig and Martin Buber, and aimed to combat what Weiss-Rosmarin saw as women's poor access to education. She and her husband offered classes in Torah, Jewish history, Hebrew, and Yiddish.

Out of the school's newsletter grew the Jewish Spectator, which described itself as a "typical family magazine with a special appeal to women." By means of her often controversial editorials, Weiss-Rosmarin sought to influence the American-Jewish community, arguing for changes in Jewish family law, Jewish–Arab co-existence in Israel, access to a Jewish education for women, and equality for women in the synagogue and in public life. An article Weiss-Rosmarin wrote for the Jewish Spectator in 1970, "The Unfreedom of Jewish Women," was considered by historian Paula Hyman as a trailblazer in analyzing the status of Jewish women using feminism.

Weiss-Rosmarin also wrote a regular column, "Letters from New York", in the London Jewish Chronicle and served as national co-chair of education for the Zionist Organization of America. She taught at New York University and the Reconstructionist Rabbinical College, and published books on a variety of subjects. She died of cancer in 1989.

== Publications ==
- Religion of Reason (1936)
- Hebrew Moses: An Answer to Sigmund Freud (1939)
- The Oneg Shabbath Books (1940)
- Highlights of Jewish History (1941)
- Judaism and Christianity: The Differences (1943)
- Jewish Survival (1949)
- Jewish Women Through The Ages (1949)
- What Every Jewish Woman Should Know (1949)
- Saadia (1959)
- Toward Jewish-Muslim Dialogue (1967)
- Jewish Expressions on Jesus: An Anthology (1977)
- Freedom and Jewish Women (1977)

=== Articles ===
She also wrote a number of articles which appeared in Sh'ma: A Journal of Jewish Responsibility, including:

- The Duty to Do Justice, Vol.11/no.202 1980.
- On Criticizing the Establishment, Vol.1/no.13 1971.
- Buber Repressed What Cohen Had Taught, Vol.4/no.682 1974.
- An End to Separate and Unequal, Vol.1/no.19 1971.

and more.

== See also ==
- Jewish feminism
- Role of women in Judaism
- Blu Greenberg
