= The Politics of Reality =

1983 book by Marilyn Frye

The Politics of Reality: Essays in Feminist Theory
- Author: Marilyn Frye
- Language: English
- Subject: Feminist theory
- Publisher: Crossing Press
- Publication date: 1983
- Publication place: United States
- Media type: Print
- Pages: 176
- ISBN: 978-0-89594-099-5
- OCLC: 9323470

The Politics of Reality: Essays in Feminist Theory is a 1983 collection of feminist essays by philosopher Marilyn Frye. Some of these essays, developed through speeches and lectures she gave, have been quoted and reprinted often, and the book has been described as a "classic" of feminist theory.

== Summary ==
Frye outlines several key concepts and fundamental issues for feminist theory in these nine essays.

As a philosopher, Frye grounds her arguments in epistemological questions and moral inquiry. An example, from her introduction, is (p. xii):

What "feminist theory" is about, to a great extent, is just identifying those forces...and displaying the mechanics of their applications to women as a group (or caste) and to individual women. The measure of the success of the theory is just how much sense it makes of what did not make sense before.

In the first essay, "Oppression," she explains a structural vision of oppression. She uses the analogy of a bird cage to explain why many people do not see oppression (p. 4-5):

If you look very closely at just one wire in the cage, you cannot see the other wires. If your conception of what is before you is determined by this myopic focus, you could look at that one wire, up and down the length of it, and be unable to see why a bird would not just fly around the wire any time it wanted to go somewhere. ... It is only when you step back, stop looking at the wires one by one, microscopically, and take a macroscopic view of the whole cage, that you can see why the bird does not go anywhere; and then you will see it in a moment.

The vision of oppression is further clarified in the second essay "Sexism," which demonstrates that sexism is a specific form of oppression (p. 33):

Oppression is a system of interrelated barriers and forces which reduce, immobilize and mold people who belong to a certain group, and effect their subordination to another group (individually to individuals of the other group, and as a group, to that group).

The third essay is titled "The Problem That Has No Name" (p. 41). The fourth essay is titled "In And Out Of Harm's Way: Arrogance And Love" (p. 52). The fifth essay is titled "A Note On Anger." The sixth essay is titled "Some Reflections On Separatism And Power" and is a justification for separate space for oppressed groups (p. 84). The seventh essay is titled "On Being White: Toward A Feminist Understanding Of Race And Race Supremacy" and is an example of a radical lesbian feminist philosopher talking through the process of analyzing her own attitudes about racism and how that fits within feminism (p. 110). The eighth essay is titled "Lesbian Feminism And The Gay Rights Movement: Another View Of Male Supremacy, Another Separatism" (p. 128). The ninth essay is titled "To Be And Be Seen: The Politics Of Reality" (p. 152).

== Reception ==
The book has been cited widely by other feminist theorists. For example, Sheila Jeffreys quotes from the introduction in Beauty and Misogyny.

In Claudia Card's review of the essays, she praises Frye's clear writing style as well as the essay's progressive contributions to feminist theory.
