= Cinderella Ate My Daughter =

2011 book by Peggy Orenstein

- Author: Peggy Orenstein
- Publisher: Harper/HarperCollins
- Publication date: 2011
- Pages: 244 pp.
- ISBN: 978-0-06-171152-7
- OCLC: 641532282

Cinderella Ate My Daughter: Dispatches From the Front Lines of the New Girlie-Girl Culture is a 2011 book written by Peggy Orenstein. The book explores the phenomenon of princess culture and in particular how the concept is marketed to young girls.

The book stemmed from an article that Orenstein wrote for The New York Times Magazine in 2006 entitled "What's Wrong With Cinderella?" In the article Orenstein relates her experiences as a mother, seeing her daughter exposed to a ubiquity of princesses and pink. The article explains the genesis of the Disney Princesses and the rise of the princess-themed merchandise and advertising.

Cinderella Ate My Daughter expands on the theme set out in the article, incorporating child beauty pageants, American Girl stores, and a Miley Cyrus concert. Orenstein concerns herself with young girls' self-esteem and the sexualization of girlhood.
