= Naomi Weisstein =

American psychologist (1939–2015)

- Born: October 16, 1939
- Died: March 26, 2015 (aged 75); Buffalo, New York, US
- Occupations: Professor and researcher
- Known for: Psychology, neuroscience and female advocacy
- Spouse: Jesse Lemisch

Naomi Weisstein (October 16, 1939 – March 26, 2015) was an American cognitive psychologist, neuroscientist, author and professor of psychology. Weisstein's main area of work was based in social psychology and cognitive neuroscience. She considered herself a radical feminist and used comedy and rock music as a way to disseminate her views and ideologies: Weisstein was an active member in founding the Chicago Women's Liberation Union, which promoted feminist activities and improved women's way of life. She received a Bachelor of Arts from Wellesley College in 1961. She then went on to complete her PhD at Harvard University in 1964. After her PhD, she finished her post-doctoral fellowship at the University of Chicago. Furthermore, she was a member of the American Association for the Advancement of Science and the American Psychological Society.

== Biography ==
Weisstein was born on October 16, 1939, to parents Mary Menk and Samuel Weisstein. Growing up, Weisstein was inspired to pursue a career in science after reading the book Microbe Hunters written by Paul de Kruif. After completing many years of schooling and educational work, she became bedridden in 1983 due to chronic fatigue syndrome and after battling ovarian cancer, she died on March 26, 2015.

=== School and work life ===
Weisstein graduated from Wellesley College in 1961 and during her time there, she was a member of Phi Beta Kappa, composed music, did stand-up comedy and wrote for the school newspaper. She later received a PhD from Harvard University in 1964. Meanwhile, Weisstein had to complete her laboratory work at Yale University where she met her husband, Jesse Lemisch, and close friend, Virginia Blaisdell. After receiving her PhD, Weisstein completed a post-doctoral fellowship at the University of Chicago with the Committee of Mathematical Biology. She later taught at the University of Chicago, Loyola University and the State University of New York until 1983. Weisstein was also a fellow of the American Association for the Advancement of Science and the American Psychological Society.

== Education ==
Naomi Weisstein completed her academic degree at four different universities. All of these universities were attended for different reasons, and several accomplishments were completed at each.

=== Harvard University ===
During her time at Harvard, Weisstein specialized in visual neuroscience. She also did research in the areas of visual cognition and cognitive neuroscience. Her dissertation was on the concept of parallel processing; which is the notion that the brain is an active agent in shaping reality. This concept is still being investigated today and modern researchers are building on the work that Weisstein produced. Weisstein graduated at the top of her class and completed her PhD in three years, despite gender discrimination from the male students and faculty. On her first day, Weisstein, along with the other female students, were told that they did not belong in graduate school, as they should be more focused on becoming wives and mothers. She was also unable to use the equipment that Harvard had to offer because they questioned her ability to use it properly, and the faculty prioritized the male students' access to the equipment. She was then denied entry to the Lamont Library on campus due to the idea that women would distract the male students studying inside. All of these incidents prompted her to complete her PhD at Yale University where she was given the proper tools and access to complete her research.

=== University of Chicago and Loyola University ===
After completing her PhD at Harvard University, Weisstein went to the University of Chicago to complete a post-doctoral fellowship with the Committee on Mathematical Biology. She pursued this opportunity because she wanted to enhance her mathematical knowledge. Since she wanted to continue her research in neuroscience, Weisstein believed that she had to complete this fellowship in order to be taken seriously in the field. During her time at the University of Chicago, Weisstein joined several political groups including the Student-Non-Violent Coordinating Committee in 1964, the Women's Radical Action Project as a consciousness-raising for feminist in 1965 and the University of Chicago Students for a Democratic Society in 1965.

While working at the university, Weisstein still faced many challenges including not being able to become a full professor because of the Nepotism Rule. Even further, faculty members began pressuring Weisstein to focus on having a family instead of pursuing her research. She was then fired from the University of Chicago in 1966. These incidents, along with her previous history at Harvard University, prompted her to become a feminist political activist. Some of her acts included publishing articles within the field of psychology that detailed the lack of understanding of females, as well as joining the Congress on Radical Equality. In 1969, she had a role in founding the Chicago Women’s Liberation Union with notable feminist community organizers such as Heather Booth and Vivian Rothstein; which included a rock band (Chicago Women’s Liberation Rock Band) with two notable songs written by Weisstein. This union prioritized improving the lives of all women and other marginalized communities, such as the LGBT community.

Weisstein began working at Loyola University in 1966 after being fired from the University of Chicago. It was at this institution that Weisstein completed the process of receiving tenure. She also began publishing articles on neuropsychology. She continued to join political groups such as the Chicago Westside Group in 1967 and the New University Conference in 1969. She remained at Loyola University until 1973, but ultimately had to leave due to the institution's inability to provide her with the equipment and support necessary to continue her cognitive neuroscience research.

=== State University of New York ===
In the mid-1970s, Weisstein and her husband Lemisch moved to Buffalo, New York, to work at the State University of New York. She continued to pursue her research in the field of cognitive neuroscience and mentored many graduate students throughout her years there. She was awarded the Guggenheim Fellowship grant in 1979. This grant is awarded to those who have displayed outstanding creativity and productive scholarships. Weisstein also wrote an article for the New Haven Women's Liberation monthly magazine, "Will The Women's Movement Survive?"

Weisstein alleged that she faced harassment from other faculty members at the institution. This supposedly included the intimidation of her students, the disputing of her findings, and sexual harassment. These alleged incidents caused Weisstein to take a leave of absence from the university and she was later diagnosed with chronic fatigue syndrome. According to Weisstein and her husband, this was due to constant attacks from the faculty members. However, no finder of fact ever formally reached that conclusion. She became bedridden in 1983 due to her condition.

== Work as a psychologist ==
Figure 1: Psychological figure

Weisstein took an active role in studying the sexism within the field of psychology. In August 1970, along with Phyllis Chesler, Joanne Evans Gardner, and others, Weisstein founded American Women in Psychology, now Division 35 of the American Psychological Association. She focused on social psychology and how social expectations influence and confound research. She was an important figure in contributing to the feminist movement by identifying distortions and biases in psychology.

=== Psychological constructs of women ===
Weisstein believed that psychology was prejudiced towards women, in that psychologists did not respect evidence that showed men and women were equal. Weisstein stated that due to the prejudice, psychologists limit the discovery of actual human potential that women possess. Similarly, according to Weisstein, women were only studied within terms set by social expectations (i.e. weaker, 'nurturer', inferior, etc.). She details more of her ideas in her article, Psychology Constructs the Female.

== Work as a neuroscientist ==
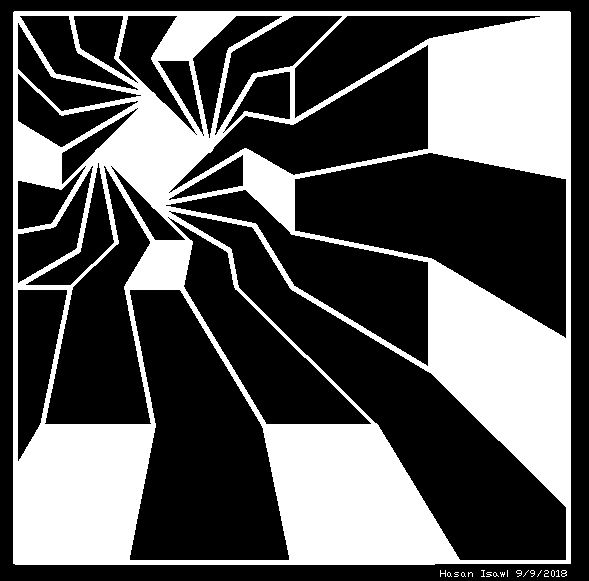
Figure 2: Example of figure-ground organization image, where identification of black figure is determined through the white background.

Her research in the field of cognitive neuroscience focused on how the brain forms perceptions. Her work showed that the brain does not passively receive information, but instead that the human mind actively assigns meaning to what it sees. This is known as the concept of parallel processing. Weisstein focused on three main areas of research: visual detection, flickering and non-flickering regions perception, and figure-ground organization and spatial frequency. All of her studies were in collaboration with other notable researchers in the field.

=== Visual detection ===
In 1974, Charles S. Harris and Naomi Weisstein discovered that when a target line is presented to an individual, it is better identified when combined in an appearing three-dimensional object (i.e. overlapping squares), in comparison to a simple two-dimensional line.

=== Flickering and non-flickering regions perception ===
Later in 1985, Eva Wong and Weisstein indicated that the depth segregation (the perception of flickering regions lies behind the non-flickering regions in visual field) is caused by a visual channel response to higher temporal frequency.

=== Figure-ground organization and spatial frequency ===
In 1986, Victor Klymenko and Naomi Weisstein found that spatial frequency differences have the ability to alter ambiguous patterns of images that are perceived through their background (i.e., figure-ground organization depicted in Figure 2). They discovered that if there is higher spatial frequency, then it is more likelihood that a figure will be seen in the stimuli. Moreover, this can be influenced and affected by several factors (i.e., shape and occlusion cues).

== Notable publications ==
- Weisstein, N. (1971). Psychology constructs the female (pp. 68–83). Boston.
- Weisstein, N., & C. Harris (1974). "Visual Detection of Line Segments: An Object-Superiority Effect". Science, 186(4165), 752–755.
- Weisstein, N., & H. Booth (1975). "Will the women's movement survive?" New Haven CT: Sister Newsletter, 4(12), 6.
- Wong, E., & N. Weisstein (1985). "A New Visual Illusion: Flickering Fields are Localized in a Depth Plane behind Nonflickering Fields". Perception, 14(1), 13–17. doi: 10.1068/p140013
- Klymenko, V., & N. Weisstein (1986). "Spatial frequency differences can determine Figure–Ground organization". Journal of Experimental Psychology: Human Perception and Performance, 12(3), 324–330. doi:10.1037/0096-1523.12.3.324
- Weisstein, N. (1993). "Psychology constructs the female; or the fantasy life of the male psychologist (with some attention to the fantasies of his friends, the male biologist and the male anthropologist)". Feminism & Psychology, 3(2), 194–210. doi:10.1177/0959353593032005
- Weisstein, N. (1997). "Power, Resistance and Science". New Politics, 6(2).
