= Chicago and New Haven Women's Liberation Rock Bands =

Rock band featuring women's voices and feminist lyrics

The Chicago Women's Liberation Rock Band and the New Haven Women's Liberation Rock Band (1969–1973) sought to challenge the genre of rock music by installing women's voices and feminist-type lyrics into the musical canon. "We loved to dance," stated bassist and vocalist Susan Abod, but referring to a song like The Rolling Stones' "Under My Thumb", "we were dancing to songs that were degrading to us." The Chicago Women's Liberation Rock Band was the self-described "agit-rock" arm of the Chicago Women's Liberation Union, an umbrella organization, "rooted in principles that came to be identified as socialist feminism, and focusing on projects in education, service, and direct-action, by and for women." The Chicago chapter of the band's lineup included: Susan Abod (bass, vocals), Sherry Jenkins (guitar, vocals), Patricia Miller (guitar, vocals), Linda Mitchell (manager), Fania Mantalvo (drums), Suzanne Prescott (drums), and Naomi Weisstein (keyboards). According to Weisstein, "she tired of hearing pop music glorify the subjugation and degradation of women.... [and] wanted to reach out to young women and at the same time, educate about the importance of feminist culture." She continued "Every time it played, the band summoned up the ecstasy of a utopian vision of a world without hierarchy and domination. Audience and performer, gay and straight, two-year-olds and eighty-two-year-olds, black teenage girls and Latino transvestites: for a moment in history as brief as a shiver, we were, all of us, transformed and astonished."

The New Haven chapter of the band included Florika Remetier (bass), Pat Ouellette (bass), Harriet Cohen (guitar) and Judy Miller (drums). As the most experienced musician, Florika acted as tutor to the other members.

In 1972, the Chicago group, along with its New Haven counterpart, recorded their first LP called Mountain Moving Day. The Chicago tracks were "Secretary", "Ain't Gonna Marry", "Papa", and "Mountain Moving Day". The New Haven tracks were "Abortion Song", "Sister Witch", "Prison Song", "So Fine!", and "Shotgun".

According to the liner notes of Mountain Moving Day: "We wanted to make music that would embody the radical, feminist, humanitarian vision we shared." For example, in "Abortion Song," lyrics read:

We've got to get together and fight.
They tell us to get married and have three or four kids.
Change the diapers, be a good wife.
But we will decide how many children to bear.
We've got to control our own life.

The band broke up in mid-1973 after Weisstein moved to the East Coast. After the band's dissolution, Abod remembered: "A lot of women came up to me after our shows and said, 'I want to do that,' and we tried to make them understand that they could. Any of them could. And I think a lot of them did." This legacy of a female-empowering, do-it-yourself ethos was echoed twenty years later in the punk music Riot Grrrl Movement. Indeed, the EP Mountain Moving Day was remastered and re-released in 2005 under the title Papa Don't Lay That Shit on Me by Rounder Records with two bonus tracks by contemporary feminist rock group Le Tigre.
