= List of feminist literature =

The following is a list of feminist literature, listed by year of first publication, then within the year alphabetically by title (using the English title rather than the foreign language title if available/applicable). Books and magazines are in italics, all other types of literature are not and are in quotation marks. References lead when possible to a link to the full text of the literature.

== 14th century ==
- De Mulieribus Claris, Giovanni Boccaccio (1361–62)
- The Wife of Bath, Geoffrey Chaucer (1343-1400)

== 15th century ==
- The Book of the City of Ladies, Christine de Pisan (c. 1405)
- The Treasure of the City of Ladies, Christine de Pisan (c. 1405)
- The Tale of Joan of Arc, Christine de Pisan (1429)

== 16th century ==
- Orlando Furioso Canto 37, Ludovico Ariosto (1516-1532)
- The Superior Excellence of Women Over Men, Heinrich Cornelius Agrippa (1529)
- The Defense of Good Women, Thomas Elyot (1545)
- La Nobiltà delle Donne, The Nobility of Women, Lodovico Domenichi (1549)
- Difese delle Donne, A Defence of Women, Domenico Bruni da Pistoia (1552)
- La bella e dotta difesa delle donne in verso, e prosa, di messer Luigi Dardano ... contra gli accusatori del sesso loro. Con un breue trattato di ammaestrare li figliuoli, The Beautiful and Learned Defence of Women in Verse, Prose ... against the detractors of their sex, with a brief tract to be administered to sons, Luigi Dardano (1553)
- Discorso sopra il Principio di Tutti I Canti di Orlando Furioso, Discourse on the Principles of all the Canti of Orlando Furioso, Laura Terracina (1583)
- Le Promenoir de M. de Montaigne qui traite de l'amour dans l'œuvre de Plutarque, Marie le Jars de Gournay (1584)
- Her Protection for Women, Jane Anger (1589)

== 17th century ==
- The Worth of Women, Il Merito delle Donne, Moderata Fonte (1600)
- "Poem 92, called Philosophical Satire", Sor Juana Inés de la Cruz (1600s)
- The Nobility and Excellence of Women and the Defects and Vices of Men, Lucrezia Marinella (1601)
- A Muzzle for Melastomus, the Cynical Baiter of, and Foul-mouthed Barker Against Eve's Sex. Or An Apologetical Answer to that Irreligious and Illiterate Pamphlet Made by Jo. Sw. And By Him Entitled, "The Arraignment of Women", Rachel Speght (1617)
- Ester Hath Hang'd Haman: An Answer To a Lewd Pamphlet, Entitled "The Arraignment of Women," With the Arraignment of Lewd, Idle Forward, and Unconstant Men, and Husbands, Ester Sowernam (1617)
- Swetnam the Woman-Hater, Anonymous (1620)
- Égalité des hommes et des femmes, Marie Le Jars de Gournay (1622), translated into English as The Equality of Men and Women
- Grief des dames, Marie Le Jars de Gournay (1626), translated into English as The Ladies' Grievance
- Women's Speaking Justified, Proved, and Allowed of by the Scriptures, All such as speak by the Spirit and Power of the Lord Jesus. And how Women were the first that Preached the Tidings of the Resurrection of Jesus, and were sent by Christ's own Command, before he Ascended to the Father, John 20. 17., Margaret Fell (1667)
- An Essay to Revive the Antient [sic] Education of Gentlewomen in Religion, Manners, Arts & Tongues, with An Answer to the Objections Against this Way of Education., Bathsua Makin (1673)
- De l'égalité des deux sexes, François Poullain de la Barre (1673)
- De l'Éducation des dames pour la conduite de l'esprit dans les sciences et dans les mœurs, entretiens, François Poullain de la Barre (1674)
- La Princesse de Clèves, Madame de La Fayette (1678)
- Female Advocate or, an Answer to a Late Satyr Against the Pride, Lust and Inconstancy, &c. of Woman. Written by a Lady in Vindication of her Sex, Sarah Fyge Egerton (1686)
- A Serious Proposal to the Ladies, for the Advancement of Their True and Greatest Interest, Mary Astell (1694)
- An Essay in Defence of the Female Sex. In Which Are Inserted the Characters of a Pedant, a Squire, a Beau, a Vertuoso, a Poetaster, a City-Critick, &c. In a Letter to a Lady. Written by a Lady, Judith Drake (1697)
- A Serious Proposal, Part II, Mary Astell (1697)
- The Adventure of the Black Lady, Aphra Behn (1697)

== 18th century ==
- Some Reflections Upon Marriage, Occasioned by the Duke and Dutchess of Mazarine's Case; Which is Also Considered., Mary Astell (1700)
- The Ladies' Defence, Or, a Dialogue Between Sir John Brute, Sir William Loveall, Melissa, and a Parson, Lady Mary Chudleigh (1701)
- The Education of Women, Daniel Defoe (1719)
- The Emulation, Sarah Fyge (1719)
- The Woman's Labour, Mary Collier (1739)
- Letters from a Peruvian Woman, Françoise de Graffigny (1747)
- The Female Quixote, Charlotte Lennox (1756)
- An Essay on Woman in Three Epistles, Mary Leapor (1763)
- Je ne sçai quoi: or, A collection of letters, odes, &c., Never before published. By a Lady, Anne B. Poyntz (1768/1769)
- Letters on Women's Rights, Abigail and John Adams (1776)
- Desultory Thoughts upon the Utility of Encouraging a Degree of Self-Complacency, Especially in Female Bosoms, Judith Sargent Murray (1784)
- Philosophie eines Weibs: Von einer Beobachterin, Marianne Ehrmann (1784)
- Mary: A Fiction, Mary Wollstonecraft (1788)
- Petition of Women of the Third Estate to the King (1789)
- "Women's Petition to the [French] National Assembly" (1789)
- On the Admission of Women to the Rights of Citizenship, Marquis de Condorcet (1790)
- "On the Equality of the Sexes", Judith Sargent Murray, from The Massachusetts Magazine, or, Monthly Museum Concerning the Literature, History, Politics, Arts, Manners, Amusements of the Age, Vol. II (1790)
- A Vindication of the Rights of Woman, Mary Wollstonecraft (1791)
- Declaration of the Rights of Woman and of the Female Citizen, Olympe de Gouges (1791)
- The Rights of Women [including the Declaration of the Rights of Woman and of the Female Citizen], Olympe de Gouges (1791)
- Breve difesa dei diritti delle donne scritta da Rosa Califronia contessa romana,, A Brief Defence of the Rights of Women of Rosa Califronia, Roman Countess, Rosa Califronia (1794)
- La causa delle donne. Discorso agl'italiani della cittadina, The Cause of Women, Discourse to Italians from a [Female] Citizen, Anonymous, (1797)
- Maria: or, The Wrongs of Woman, Mary Wollstonecraft (1798)

== 19th century ==
=== 1810s–1820s ===
- Pride and Prejudice, Jane Austen (1813)
- "An Address to the Public; Particularly to the Members of the Legislature of New-York, Proposing a Plan for Improving Female Education", Emma Willard (1819)
- "Men and Women; Brief Hypothesis concerning the Difference in their Genius", John Neal (1824)
- The Skeleton Count, or The Vampire Mistress, Elizabeth Caroline Grey (1828)

=== 1830s ===
- Indiana, George Sand (pen name of Amantine-Lucile-Aurore Dupin) (1832)
- "Marriage Law Protest", Robert Dale Owen (1832)
- Valentine, George Sand (pen name of Amantine-Lucile-Aurore Dupin) (1832)
- Lélia, George Sand (pen name of Amantine-Lucile-Aurore Dupin) (1833)
- Jacques, George Sand (pen name of Amantine-Lucile-Aurore Dupin) (1834)
- The History of the Condition of Women in Various Ages and Nations, Lydia Maria Child (1835)
- Letters on the Equality of the Sexes, Sarah Grimke (1837)
- "Remarks Comprising in Substance Judge Hertell's Argument in the House of Assembly in the State of New York in the Session of 1837 in Support of the Bill to Restore to Married Women the 'Right of Property' as Guaranteed by the Constitution of the United States", Judge Thomas Hertell (1837)
- The Times that Try Men's Souls, Maria Weston Chapman (1837)
- Woman, Harriet Martineau (1837)
- On Marriage, Harriet Martineau (1838)

=== 1840s ===
- "Rights of Women: The Substance of a Lecture Delivered by John Neal at the Tabernacle", John Neal (1843)
- The Great Lawsuit, Margaret Fuller (1843)
- Brief History of the Condition of Women: in Various Ages and Nations, Volume 2, Lydia Maria Child (1845)
- "The Rights and Condition of Women", Samuel May (1845)
- Woman in the Nineteenth Century, Margaret Fuller (1845)
- Poganka (The Heathen Woman), by Narcyza Żmichowska (1846)
- Jane Eyre, Charlotte Brontë (1847)
- Pittsburgh Saturday Visiter, women's rights and abolitionist paper founded by Jane Swisshelm
- "Seneca Falls Declaration of Sentiments and Resolutions", Elizabeth Cady Stanton (main author) (1848)
- The Tenant of Wildfell Hall, Anne Brontë (1848)
- "Voting Rights Speech", Elizabeth Cady Stanton (1848)
- "Discourse on Woman", Lucretia Mott (1849)
- The Lily, newspaper published by Amelia Bloomer (1849)

=== 1850s ===
- The Scarlet Letter, Nathaniel Hawthorne (1850)
- Woman and Her Needs, Elizabeth Oakes Smith (1850–1851)
- Ain't I a Woman? speech, Sojourner Truth (1851)
- "Enfranchisement of Women", Harriet Taylor Mill, from the Westminster Review (1851)
- "Speech at the National Woman's Rights Convention", Ernestine Rose (1851)
- "The Responsibilities of Woman", Clarina Howard Nichols (1851)
- "Cassandra", Florence Nightingale (1852)
- "Speech at the National Woman's Rights Convention", Matilda Joslyn Gage (1852)
- Die Deutsche Frauen-Zeitung, German-language women's rights journal published by Mathilde Franziska Anneke (1852)
- Villette, Charlotte Brontë (1853)
- What Time of Night It Is, Sojourner Truth (1853)
- Women's Rights, William Lloyd Garrison (1853)
- The Una, feminist periodical published by Paulina Kellogg Wright Davis (1853)
- "A Brief Summary in Plain Language of the Most Important Laws Concerning Women", Barbara Bodichon (1854)
- "Address to the Legislature of New York", Elizabeth Cady Stanton (1854)
- "English Laws for Women in the Nineteenth Century", Caroline Norton (1854)
- "A Letter to the Queen On Lord Chancellor Cranworth's Marriage and Divorce Bill", Caroline Norton (1855)
- Marriage of Lucy Stone Under Protest, Lucy Stone, Rev. Thomas Wentworth Higginson, and Henry Blackwell (1855)
- "The Paradise of Bachelors and the Tartarus of Maids", Herman Melville (1855)
- Ruth Hall, Fanny Fern (1855)
- "The Right of Women to Exercise the Elective Franchise", Agnes Pochin (1855)
- Hertha, Fredrika Bremer (1856)
- "Consistent democracy. The elective franchise for women. Twenty-five testimonies of prominent men, viz: ex-Gov. Anthony of R.I., Rev. Henry Ward Beecher, Rev. Wm.H. Channing [etc.]" (1858)
- "Female Ministry, Or, Woman's Right to Preach the Gospel", Catherine Booth (1859)
- "Ought Women to Learn the Alphabet?", Thomas Wentworth Higginson (1859)

=== 1860s ===
- "A Practical Illustration of 'Woman's Right to Labor;' or, A Letter from Marie E. Zakrzewska, M.D., Late of Berlin, Prussia", edited by Caroline H. Dall (1860)
- A Slave's Appeal, Elizabeth Cady Stanton (1860)
- Female Teaching, Catherine Booth (1861)
- Incidents in the Life of a Slave Girl, Harriet Jacobs (1861)
- "A Woman's Philosophy of Woman; or Woman Affranchised. An Answer to Michelet, Proudhon, Girardin, Legouve, Comte, and Other Modern Innovators", Jenny d'Héricourt (1864)
- A Long Fatal Love Chase, Louisa May Alcott (1866)
- "Objections to the Enfranchisement of Women Considered", Barbara Bodichon (1866)
- The Higher Education of Women, Emily Davies (1866)
- "Address To The First Anniversary Of The American Equal Rights Association", Frances D. Gage (1867)
- "Keeping the Thing Going While Things Are Stirring", Sojourner Truth (1867)
- Little Women, Louisa May Alcott (1868)
- "The Destructive Male", Elizabeth Cady Stanton (1868)
- "The Education and Employment of Women", Josephine Butler (1868)
- Criminals, Idiots, Women, and Minors, Frances Power Cobbe (1869)
- The Subjection of Women, John Stuart Mill (1869)
- The Woman with Prospects, Concepción Arenal (Seville, Spain) (1869)
- Women and Politics, Charles Kingsley (1869)

=== 1870s ===
- "About Marrying Too Young" from The Revolution, Elizabeth Cady Stanton (1870)
- "Are Women A Class?", Lillie Blake (1870)
- "Our Policy: An Address to Women Concerning the Suffrage", Frances Power Cobbe (1870)
- Man's Rights, Annie Denton Cridge (1870)
- Endorsing Women's Enfranchisement, Adelle Hazlett (1871)
- Hit: Essays on Women's Rights, Mary Edwards Walker (1871)
- "Letters to and from Polly Plum", Polly Plum (pen name of Mary Ann Colclough) (1871)
- On the Progress of Education and Industrial Avocations for Women, Matilda Joslyn Gage (1871)
- "Put Us In Your Place" from The Revolution, Lillie Blake (1871)
- On Woman's Right to Suffrage, Susan B. Anthony (1872)
- Reasons For and Against the Enfranchisement of Women, Barbara Bodichon (1872)
- The Adventures of a Woman in Search of her Rights, Florence Claxton (1872)
- Marta (Polish for "Martha"), a novel by Eliza Orzeszkowa (1873)
- "Sentencing of Susan B. Anthony for the Crime of Voting" (1873)
- "Uncivil Liberty: An Essay to Show the Injustice and Impolicy of Ruling Woman Without Her Consent", Ezra Heywood (1873)
- Woman: Man's Equal, Thomas Webster (1873)
- "Women's Temperance Movement", Mark Twain (1873)
- Papa's Own Girl, Marie Howland (1874)
- "Some Thoughts on the Present Aspect of the Crusade Against the State Regulation of Vice", Catherine Booth (1874)
- Blackwell, Antoinette (1976) [first published 1875]. The Sexes Throughout Nature. Hyperion Press. ISBN 0-88355-349-X.
- "Declaration of Rights of the Women of the United States", National Woman Suffrage Association, July 4, 1876
- Why Women Desire the Franchise, Frances Power Cobbe (1877)
- "An Appeal to the Men of New Zealand", Femina (pen name of Mary Ann Muller) (1878)
- A Doll's House, Henrik Ibsen (1879)
- Social Purity, Josephine Butler (1879)
- The Colorado Antelope, feminist periodical founded by Caroline Nichols Churchill in 1879, later known as the Queen Bee.

=== 1880s ===
- Mizora, Mary Lane (1880–81)
- Common Sense About Women, Thomas Wentworth Higginson (1881)
- Women and the Alphabet: A Series of Essays, Thomas Wentworth Higginson (1881)
- Die Frauenfrage in Deutschland, Augusta Bender (1883)
- The Constitutional Rights of the Women of the United States, Isabella Beecher Hooker (1883)
- The Story of an African Farm, Olive Schreiner (1883)
- The Woman in her House, Concepción Arenal (1883)
- What Shall We Do With our Daughters? Superfluous Women and Other Lectures, Mary A. Livermore (1883)
- "Woman as an Inventor", Matilda Joslyn Gage (1883)
- The Iniquity of State Regulated Vice, Catherine Booth (1884)
- "The Need of Liberal Divorce Laws" from the North American Review, Elizabeth Cady Stanton (1884)
- The Origin of the Family, Private Property and the State, Friedrich Engels (1884)
- "Has Christianity Benefited Woman?", Elizabeth Cady Stanton, from the North American Review (1885)
- Men, Women, And Gods, And Other Lectures, Helen H. Gardener (1885)
- The Bostonians, Henry James (1886)
- Cathy the Caryatid (Polish: Kaśka Kariatyda), a novel by Gabriela Zapolska (1886)
- The Woman Question, Edward Aveling and Eleanor Marx Aveling (1886)
- Misogyny in Excelsis, Annie Besant (1887)
- Women and Men, Thomas Wentworth Higginson (1888)
- Women Who Go To College, Arthur Gilman (1888)
- New Amazonia, Elizabeth Burgoyne Corbett (1889)
- The Administratrix, Emma Ghent Curtis (1889)
- Anno Domini, or Woman's Destiny 2000 Julius Vogel 1889
- Ein deutsches Mädchen in Amerika, Augusta Bender (1893)

=== 1890s ===
- "Sex Slavery", Voltairine de Cleyre (1890)
- Le Droit des femmes, meaning Women's Rights (1869 to 1891)
- A Doll's House Repaired, Eleanor Marx Aveling (1891)
- The Woman's Movement in the South, A.P. Mayo (1891)
- "Transactions of the National Council of Women of the United States" (1891)
- A Voice from the South, Anna Julia Cooper (1892)
- "Hearing of the Woman Suffrage Association" (1892)
- Solitude of Self, Elizabeth Cady Stanton (1892)
- "The Yellow Wallpaper", Charlotte Perkins Gilman (1892)
- Woman's Progress, Catholic women's rights periodical (1892)
- The New Woman (Polish: Emancypantki), a novel by Bolesław Prus (1890–93)
- So That Women May Receive the Vote, Meri Te Tai Mangakāhia (1893)
- "The Progress of Fifty Years", Lucy Stone (1893)
- Unveiling a Parallel, Alice Ilgenfritz Jones & Ella Merchant (1893)
- Woman, Church, and State, Matilda Joslyn Gage (1893)
- Women's Cause is One and Universal, Anna Julia Cooper (1893)
- "Common Sense" Applied to Women's Suffrage, Mary Corinna Putnam Jacobi (1894)
- "Speech on Women's Suffrage", Carrie Chapman Catt (1894)
- "The Story of an Hour", Kate Chopin (1894)
- The New Woman, Winona Branch Sawyer (1895)
- "What Becomes of the Girl Graduates", Winona Branch Sawyer (1895)
- "Anarchy and the Sex Question" from the New York World, Emma Goldman (1896)
- "Only in Conjunction With the Proletarian Woman Will Socialism Be Victorious", Clara Zetkin (1896)
- The Proletarian in the Home, Eleanor Marx Aveling (1896)
- The Women of To-Morrow, William Hard (1896)
- Truth Before Everything, Catherine Booth (1897)
- "Why Go To College? An Address by Alice Freeman Palmer, Formerly President of Wellesley College", Alice Freeman Palmer (1897)
- Eighty Years and More, Elizabeth Cady Stanton (1898)
- The Renaissance of Girls' Education in England, a Record of Fifty Years Progress, Alice Zimmern (1898)
- "The Storm", Kate Chopin (1898)
- The Woman's Bible, Elizabeth Cady Stanton (1898)
- Women and Economics, Charlotte Perkins Gilman (1898)
- Arqtiq, Anna Adolph (1899)
- The Awakening, Kate Chopin (1899)

== 20th century ==
=== 1900s ===
- "Are Homogenous [sic] Divorce Laws in All the States Desirable?" from the North American Review, Elizabeth Cady Stanton (1900)
- "Inspired" Marriage, Robert Ingersoll (1900)
- "Progress of the American Woman" from the North American Review, Elizabeth Cady Stanton (1900)
- A Bundle of Fallacies, Dora Montefiore (1901)
- Die Frauenfrage ihre geschichtliche Entwicklung und wirtschaftliche Seite, Lily Braun (1901)
- Midaregami, Yosano Akiko (1901)
- "Votes for Women", Mark Twain (1901)
- Woman, Kate Austin (1901)
- "A Response to "Republics Versus Women" by Mrs. Kate Trimble Wolsey", Dora Montefiore (1903)
- "Declaration of Principles", by the National American Woman Suffrage Association (1904)
- "What Interest does the Women's Movement have in Solving the Homosexual Problem?" by Anna Rüling (1904)
- "Sultana's Dream" from The Indian Ladies Magazine, Begum Rokeya Sakhawat Hossain (1905)
- The House of Mirth, Edith Wharton (1905)
- Blackburn S.D.P., Dora Montefiore (1906)
- "German Socialist Women's Movement", Clara Zetkin (1906)
- Jus Suffragii, the official journal of the International Woman Suffrage Alliance (1906 to 1924)
- Kobiety, Zofia Nałkowska (1906)
- Love's Coming of Age, Edward Carpenter (1906)
- Social-Democracy & Woman Suffrage, Clara Zetkin (1906)
- "Some Words to Socialist Women", Dora Montefiore (1907)
- "A Response to "Why I am Opposed to Female Suffrage" by E. Belfort Bax", Dora Montefiore (1909)
- "A Review of "Women's Work and Wages" by Edward Cadbury M., Cecile Matheson and George Shann", Dora Montefiore (1909)
- Herland, Charlotte Perkins Gilman (1909)
- "Items of Interest", Dora Montefiore (1909)
- "Items of Interest from Other Countries", Dora Montefiore (1909)
- "Ladies and the Suffrage", Dora Montefiore (1909)
- "Politics and Prayers", Dora Montefiore (1909)
- The Englishwoman, Dora Montefiore (1909)
- The Evolution of Sex, Dora Montefiore (1909)
- "The Future of Woman", Dora Montefiore (1909)
- "The Latest Play of the Stage Society", Dora Montefiore (1909)
- "The London Congress of the International Alliance for Women Suffrage", Dora Montefiore (1909)
- "The Position of Women in the Socialist Movement", Dora Montefiore (1909)
- The Woman Movement, Ellen Key (1909)
- What Diantha Did, Charlotte Perkins Gilman (1909–10)
- "What Every Socialist Woman Should Know", Dora Montefiore (1909)
- "Woman – Comrade and Equal", Eugene V. Debs (1909)
- Narcyza, Zofia Nałkowska (1910 Polish novel)

=== 1910s ===
- Love and Marriage, Ellen Key (1911)
- Marriage and Love, Emma Goldman (1911)
- Moving the Mountain, Charlotte Perkins Gilman (1911)
- Our Androcentric Culture, or The Man Made World, Charlotte Perkins Gilman (1911)
- "The Hypocrisy of Puritanism", Emma Goldman (1911)
- The Sex and Woman Questions, Lena Morrow Lewis (1911)
- "The Traffic in Women", Emma Goldman (1911)
- "The Tragedy of Woman's Emancipation", Emma Goldman (1911)
- Woman and Labor, Olive Schreiner (1911)
- Pygmalion, George Bernard Shaw (1912)
- "Sudden Jolt Forward of the World", Dora Montefiore (1912)
- The Woman Voter, Vida Goldstein (1912)
- Two Suffrage Movements, Martha Gruening (1912)
- "Womanhood Suffrage", Dora Montefiore (1912)
- "The Woman With Empty Hands: The Evolution of a Suffragette", Marion Hamilton Carter (1913)
- "Freedom or Death", Emmeline Pankhurst (1913)
- "If Men Were Seeking the Franchise", Jane Addams (1913)
- Samantha on the Woman Question, Marietta Holley
- The Needle and the Pen, poem by Silvia Fernandez (1913)
- "Why I Wrote the Yellow Wallpaper" from The Forerunner, Charlotte Perkins Gilman (1913)
- A Short History of Women's Rights, From the Days of Augustus to the Present Time. With Special Reference to England and the United States, Eugene A. Hecker (1914)
- La Rosa Muerta, Aurora Cáceres (1914)
- To the Women of Kooyong, Vida Goldstein (1914)
- Are Women People? A Book of Rhymes for Suffrage Times, Alice Duer Miller (1915)
- "How It Feels to Be the Husband of a Suffragette", Mr. Catt (married to Carrie Chapman Catt) (1915)
- In Times Like These, Nellie L. McClung (1915)
- "The Fundamental Principle of a Republic", Anna Howard Shaw (1915)
- Woman's Work in Municipalities, Mary Ritter Beard (1915)
- "The Crisis", Carrie Chapman Catt (1916)
- "The Social Evil, Women's Convention, by the Women's Political Association (Non-Party)" (1916)
- Trifles: A Play in One Act, Susan Glaspell (1916)
- With Her in Ourland, Charlotte Perkins Gilman (1916)
- The Job, Sinclair Lewis (1917)
- The Sturdy Oak, Elizabeth Jordan (editor) (1917)
- "Speech to Congress", Carrie Chapman Catt (1917)
- Woman Suffrage, Emma Goldman (1917)
- Women Are People!, Alice Duer Miller (1917)
- "Labour Party Women's Conference", Dora Montefiore (1918)
- Married Love, Marie Stopes (1918)
- "Mobilizing Woman-Power", Harriot Stanton Blatch (1918)
- "A Call to Our Women Comrades", Dora Montefiore (1919)
- "On the History of the Movement of Women Workers in Russia", Alexandra Kollontai (1919)
- Pioneers of Birth Control in England and America, Victor Robinson (1919)
- The Wages of Men and Women: Should They be Equal?, Beatrice Webb (1919)
- The Woman and the Right to Vote, Rafael Palma (1919)
- Woman triumphant; the story of her struggles for freedom, education, and political rights. Dedicated to all noble-minded women by an appreciative member of the other sex, Rudolph Cronau (1919)
- "Women Workers Struggle For Their Rights", Alexandra Kollontai (1919)

=== 1920s ===
- Communism and the Family, Alexandra Kollontai (1920)
- "International Women's Day", Alexandra Kollontai (1920)
- Jailed For Freedom, Doris Stevens (1920)
- Now We Can Begin, Crystal Eastman (1920)
- Race Motherhood, Is Woman a Race?, Dora Montefiore (1920)
- The Age of Innocence, Edith Wharton (1920)
- Woman and the New Race, Margaret Sanger (1920)
- Women and Communism, Dora Montefiore (1920)
- Mrs. Swanwick on Women, Dora Montefiore (1921)
- Prostitution and Ways of Fighting It, Alexandra Kollontai (1921)
- Sexual Relations and the Class Struggle, Alexandra Kollontai (1921)
- The Labor of Women in the Evolution of the Economy, Alexandra Kollontai (1921)
- The Morality of Birth Control, Margaret Sanger (1921)
- Theses on Communist Morality in the Sphere of Marital Relations, Alexandra Kollontai (1921)
- "Woman's Rights Party Platform" (1922)
- A Great Love, Alexandra Kollontai (1923)
- Red Love, Alexandra Kollontai (1923)
- "Manifesto of the [Japanese] League for the Realization of Women's Suffrage" (1924)
- From a Victorian To a Modern, Dora Montefiore (1925)
- "The Double Task: The Struggle of Negro Women for Sex and Race Emancipation", Elise Johnson McDougald (1925)
- Concerning Women, Suzanne La Follette (1926)
- The Autobiography of a Sexually Emancipated Communist Woman, Alexandra Kollontai (1926)
- Orlando: A Biography, Virginia Woolf (1928)
- A Room of One's Own, Virginia Woolf (1929)

=== 1930s ===
- Proud Man, Katharine Burdekin (1934)
- Women in Music, edited by Frédérique Petrides (1935)
- Nightwood, Djuna Barnes (1936)
- Swastika Night, Katharine Burdekin (1937)
- Three Guineas, Virginia Woolf (1938)

=== 1940s ===
- Are Women Paid Men's Rates?, Robert L. Day, Lucy G. Woodcock, and Muriel Heagney of the Council of Action for Equal Pay (1942)
- Laura, Vera Caspary (1943)
- Woman as a Force in History. A Study in Traditions and Realities, Mary Ritter Beard (1946)
- The Second Sex (French: Le Deuxième Sexe), Simone de Beauvoir (1949)

=== 1950s ===
- "Women as a Minority Group", Helen Mayer Hacker (1951)
- The Matriarchal-Brotherhood: Sex and Labor in primitive society, Evelyn Reed (1954)
- The Myth of Women's Inferiority, Evelyn Reed (1954)
- The Feminist Movement in the Philippines 1905-1955: A Golden Book to commemorate The Golden Jubilee of the Feminist Movement in the Philippines, Trinidad Tarrosa-Subido (1955)

=== 1960s ===
- "The Human Situation: A Feminine View", Valerie Saiving (1960)
- "Kvinnans villkorliga frigivning", translated into English as "Woman's Release on Probation", Eva Moberg (1961)
- The Golden Notebook, Doris Lessing (1962)
- "A Bunny's Tale, Part I", by Gloria Steinem (1963)
- "A Bunny's Tale, Part II", by Gloria Steinem (1963)
- "Equality Between the Sexes: An Immodest Proposal", Alice S. Rossi (1963)
- "On the Publication of the Second Sex", Simone de Beauvoir (1963)
- The Bell Jar, Sylvia Plath (1963)
- The Feminine Mystique, Betty Friedan (1963)
- "A Study of the Feminine Mystique", Evelyn Reed (1964)
- Student Nonviolent Coordinating Committee Position Paper: Women in the Movement (1964)
- "Jane Crow and the Law: Sex Discrimination and Title VII", Mary Eastwood and Pauli Murray (1965)
- "Sex and Caste – A Kind of Memo", Casey Hayden and Mary King (1965)
- Up Your Ass, Valerie Solanas (1965)
- Applesauce by June Arnold (1966)
- Child, Andrea Dworkin (1966)
- "Free Woman" from the San Francisco Express Times, Heather Dean (1966)
- The National Organization for Women's 1966 Statement of Purpose, Betty Friedan (1966)
- "What Concrete Steps Can Be Taken to Further the Homophile Movement", Shirley Willer (1966)
- Wide Sargasso Sea, Jean Rhys (1966)
- "Woman's Place: Silence or Service?", Letha Dawson Scanzoni (1966) (original manuscript, possibly not as published in 1966)
- "Women: The Longest Revolution", Juliet Mitchell (1966)
- De Schaamte Voorbij, Anja Meulenbelt (1967), translated into English as The Shame is Over
- Diary of a Mad Housewife, Sue Kaufman (1967)
- "Het onbehagen bij de vrouw", Joke Kool-Smits (1967), translated into English as "The Discontent of Women"
- "The Radical Women Manifesto: Socialist Feminist Theory, Program and Organizational Structure", by Radical Women (1967)
- "To the Women of the Left" (1967)
- "Abortion Rally Speech", Anne Koedt (1968)
- "A Letter to the Editor of Ramparts Magazine", Lynn Piartney (1968)
- "Black Women in Poverty", various authors (1968)
- "Burial of Weeping Womanhood", Radical Women's Group (1968)
- "Elevate Marriage to Partnership", Letha Dawson Scanzoni (1968) (original manuscript, not as published in 1968)
- "Funeral Oration for the Burial of Traditional Womanhood", Kathie Amatniek (1968)
- "Letter to the Editor in Response to a Guardian Article", Ellen Willis (1968)
- Morning Hair, Andrea Dworkin (1968)
- National Organization for Women (N.O.W.) Bill of Rights (1968)
- No More Fun and Games: A Journal of Female Liberation (1968)
- "No More Miss America!" (press release for Redstockings), Robin Morgan (1968)
- Notes From the First Year, New York Radical Women (1968)
- "Psychology Constructs the Female", Naomi Weisstein (1968)
- "Principles", New York Radical Women (1968)
- SCUM Manifesto, Valerie Solanas (1968)
- Sexual Politics, Kate Millett (1968)
- The Church and the Second Sex, Mary Daly (1968)
- "The Jeanette Rankin Brigade: Woman Power? A Summary of Our Involvement", Shulamith Firestone (1968)
- "The Lesbian's Other Identity", Del Martin (1968)
- "The Women's Liberation Front" from Moderator, Joreen (1968)
- "The Women's Rights Movement in the US: A New View", Shulamith Firestone (1968)
- "Towards a Radical Movement", Heather Booth, Evie Goldfield, and Sue Munaker (1968)
- "Understanding Orgasm" from Ramparts, Susan Lydon (1968)
- Voice of the Women's Liberation Movement [newsletter] (1968–1969)
- "What Sort of Man Reads Playboy?" (1968)
- "Women and Power", Gloria Steinem (1968)
- "After Black Power, Women's Liberation", Gloria Steinem (1969)
- "A Historical and Critical Essay for Black Women", Patricia Haden, Donna Middleton, and Patricia Robinson (1969–1970)
- "A Marriage Agreement", Alix Kates Shulman (1969)
- "Are Men Really the Enemy?", Jayne West (1969)
- "An Argument for Black Women's Liberation As a Revolutionary Force", Mary Ann Weathers (1969)
- "An 'Oppressed Majority' Demands Its Rights" from Life, Sara Davidson (1969)
- Double Jeopardy: To Be Black and Female, Frances Beal (1969)
- "Equal Rights for Women", Shirley Chisholm (1969)
- "Females and Welfare", Betsy Warrior (1969)
- "Founding Editorial" from Women: A Journal of Liberation (1969)
- "Freedom for Movement Girls – Now", vanauken (1969)
- I Know Why the Caged Bird Sings, Maya Angelou (1969)
- "Lesbianism and Feminism", Wilda Chase (1969)
- Les Guérillères, Monique Wittig (1969)
- "Politics of the Ego: A Manifesto", New York Radical Feminists (1969)
- Proposed Statement of Political Principles (1969)
- "Radical Feminism and Love", Ti-Grace Atkinson (1969)
- "Redstockings Manifesto" (1969)
- "Sweet 16 to Saggy 36: Saga of American Womanhood", Cleveland Radical Women's Group (1969)
- "The First Press Coverage of the Redstockings" from Scenes (1969)
- "The Grand Coolie Damn", Marge Piercy (1969)
- "The Last of the Red Hot Mammas, Or, the Liberation of Women as Performed by the Inmates of the World" (1969)
- "The Next Great Moment in History Is Theirs", Vivian Gornick (1969)
- "The Political Economy of Women's Liberation", Margaret Benston (1969)
- "Towards a Revolutionary Women's Union: A Strategic Perspective"', Terry R. and Lucy G. (1969)
- "What is the Revolutionary Potential of Women's Liberation?", Kathy McAfee and Myrna Wood (1969)
- "Who Is the Enemy?", Roxanne Dunbar (1969)
- Who We Are: Descriptions of Women's Liberation Groups (1969)
- "Women and the Myth of Consumerism", Ellen Willis (1969)

=== 1970s ===
- "A Monologue by Naomi Weisstein" (1970s)
- "A Proposal for Community Work", Vivian Rothstein and Mary M. (1970s)
- An Unsuitable Job for a Woman, P.D. James, (1972)
- Liberation of Women: Sexual Repression and the Family, Laurel Limpus (1970s)
- "About Us", San Diego Women's Collective (1970)
- "Benjo Kara no Kaiho", in English "Liberation from the Toilet", Mitsu Tanaka (1970)
- "Black Woman's Manifesto", Third World Women's Alliance (1970)
- Black Women's Liberation, Maxine Williams and Pamela Newman (1970)
- Chains or Change, by the Irish Women's Liberation Movement (1970)
- Chicago and New Haven Women's Liberation Rock Bands lyrics (1970s)
- "Cutting Loose", Sally Kempton (1970)
- "Erosu Kaihō Sengen", in English "Liberation from Eros," Mitsu Tanaka (1970)
- "For the Equal Rights Amendment", Shirley Chisholm (1970)
- "Goodbye to All That" from Rat, Robin Morgan (1970)
- Heresies: A Feminist Publication on Art and Politics (1977-1992)
- I Am What I Am, Lorna Cherot (1970)
- "If That's All There Is", Del Martin (1970)
- "Institutional Discrimination", Joreen (1970)
- "Is Man an 'Aggressive Ape?'", Evelyn Reed (1970)
- "Judge Carswell And The 'Sex Plus' Doctrine", Betty Friedan (1970)
- Notes From The Second Year: Women's Liberation, New York Radical Women (1970)
- off our backs (1970–present)
- "Poor White Women", Roxanne Dunbar (1970)
- Sexual Politics, Kate Millett (1970)
- Sisterhood Is Powerful: An Anthology of Writings from the Women's Liberation Movement, edited by Robin Morgan (1970)
- "Take a Good Look at Our Problems", Pamela Newman (1970)
- "The BITCH Manifesto", Jo Freeman (1970)
- "The Building of the Gilded Cage" from The Second Wave: A Magazine of the New Feminism, Joreen (1970)
- The Dialectic of Sex: The Case for Feminist Revolution, Shulamith Firestone (1970)
- The Female Eunuch, Germaine Greer (1970)
- The Liberation of Black Women, Pauli Murray (1970)
- "The Myth of the Vaginal Orgasm", Anne Koedt (1970)
- "The Politics of Housework", Pat Mainardi of Redstockings (1970)
- "The Revolution is Happening in Our Minds" from Revolution II: Thinking Female, Joreen (1970)
- "The Role of Government Agencies in Gaining Equal Rights for Women", DARE (1970)
- "The Unfreedom of Jewish Women", Trude Weiss-Rosmarin (1970)
- "The Woman Identified Woman", Radicalesbians (1970)
- "Towards A Revolutionary Women's Union: A Strategic Perspective", Terry R. and Lucy G. (1970)
- "You Are Not My God, Jehovah!", Rev. Peggy Way (1970)
- "Young Lords Party Position Paper on Women", Central Committee of the Young Lords Party (1970)
- What Is a Woman?, Norma Allen (1970)
- "What Is Women's Liberation?", Marilyn Salzman Webb, from WIN (1970)
- "What It Would Be Like If Women Win", Gloria Steinem (1970)
- "What Men Can Do For Women's Liberation", Gainesville Women's Liberation (1970)
- "Who We Are", Siren: A Journal of Anarcho-Feminism (1970)
- "Why 'Sex Liberation' – Raising the Problem of Women's Liberation", Mitsu Tanaka (1970)
- "Why Women's Liberation is Important to Black Women", Maxine Williams (1970)
- "Woman and Her Mind: The Story of Daily Life", Meredith Tax (1970)
- "Women: Caste, Class, or Oppressed Sex", Evelyn Reed (1970)
- "Women on the Social Science Faculties since 1892 (at the University of Chicago)", Joreen (1970)
- "'Women's Liberation' Aims to Free Men Too" from the
- Women's Report, British bi-monthly newspaper (1972–79)
- Washington Post, Gloria Steinem (1970)
- "Women's Lib Organizations", Karen Durbin, from WIN (1970)
- "Women's Lib: The War on 'Sexism'", Helen Dudar (1970)
- "Women's Oppression: Cortejas", Connie Morales, Education Ministry, Young Lords (1970)
- "Abortions", Gloria Colon, Ministry of Education, Central Headquarters Young Lords Party (1971)
- "A Daughter and Mother Talk About Sexuality", Elaine and her mother from Womankind (1971–1972)
- "A Defense of Abortion" from Philosophy & Public Affairs, Vol. 1, no. 1, Judith Jarvis Thomson (Fall 1971)
- "After the Death of God the Father" from Commonweal, Mary Daly (1971)
- "Analysis of Chicago Women's Liberation School", Chicago Women's Liberation Union (1971)
- "And Jill Came Tumbling After" from Womankind (1971)
- "An End to Separate and Unequal", Trude Weiss-Rosmarin (1971)
- "A Statement About Female Liberation" (1971)
- "Bogeymen and Bogeywomen", Judy from Womankind (1971)
- "Can Women Love Women?" (interview by Anne Koedt, 1971)
- "Desexing the Language", Casey Miller and Kate Swift (1971)
- "Down With Sexist Upbringing!", Letty Cottin Pogrebin (1971)
- "Equal Only When Obligated", Deborah Miller (1971)
- "Feminism and 'The Female Eunuch'", Evelyn Reed (1971)
- "Feminism: Old Wave and New Wave", Ellen DuBois (1971)
- "Free Abortion is Every Woman's Right: Statement of the Chicago Women's Liberation Union" (1971)
- "Going Through Changes", Joan from Womankind (1971)
- "High School Women Ask: What is Women's Liberation?" from Womankind (1971)
- "How to Start your Own Consciousness-Raising Group" (leaflet distributed by the Chicago Women's Liberation Union, 1971)
- "Is Biology Woman's Destiny?", Evelyn Reed (1971)
- "Manifeste des 343 Salopes", Simone de Beauvoir, from Le Nouvel Observateur (1971), translated into English as the "Manifesto of the 343 Sluts"
- "Lemme Tell Ya About Being a Woman Lawyer...", Susan from Womankind (1971)
- "Lesbianism and Feminism", Anne Koedt (1971)
- "Masters of War" from Womankind (1971)
- "Mr. Smith, Take A Memo: I've Got Some Things to Tell You" from Womankind (1971)
- Ms. (1971–present)
- "New York Radical Feminists Manifesto of Shared Rape" (1971)
- "No Lady" from Black Maria (1971)
- Notes for the (future Furies Collective) Cell Meeting (1971)
- Notes From The Third Year: Women's Liberation, New York Radical Women (1971)
- "Notes on a Writer's Workshop" from Black Maria, Donna I. (1971)
- "Politicalesbians and the Women's Liberation Movement", Anonymous Realesbians (1971)
- "Position on Women's Liberation", Central Committee, Young Lords Party (1971)
- "Rape: An Act of Terror", Barbara Mehrhof and Pamela Kearon (1971)
- "Rape Means Never Having to Say You're Sorry", Kay Potter (1971)
- "Sexism", Gloria González, Field Marshal, Young Lords Party (1971)
- "Statement by Elma Barrera" (1971)
- The First Sex, Elizabeth Gould Davis (1971)
- "The Housewife's Moment of Truth", Jane O'Reilly (1971)
- "The Jew Who Wasn't There: Halacha and the Jewish Woman", Rachel Adler (1971)
- "The Lesbian Newsletter", Daughters of Bilitis (1971)
- "The Politics of Sterilization", Chicago Women's Liberation Union (1971)
- "The Social Construction of the Second Sex" from Roles Women Play: Readings Towards Women's Liberation, Joreen (1971)
- "The Vagina on Trial", Kathleen Barry (1971)
- "United Women's Contingent: March On Washington Against the War" (1971)
- "Using Your Maiden Name", Diane and Linda from Womankind (1971)
- "Why Have There Been No Great Women Artists?" from ARTnews, Linda Nochlin (1971)
- "Why Women's Liberation?" from Black Maria (1971)
- "Woman as Patient", Laura Green and Womankind (1971)
- Woman's Estate, Juliet Mitchell (1971)
- "Women: New Voice of La Raza", Mirta Vidal (1971)
- "Women's Liberation: A Catholic View", Marilyn Bowers (1971)
- "Women's Liberation and Its Impact on the Campus" from Liberal Education, Joreen (1971)
- Women's March on D.C., Anne and Heidi (1971)
- "Working Women Get Together", Dagmar and Laura from Womankind (1971)
- "Workshop Resolutions of the First National Chicana Conference" (1971)
- "A Call for the Castration of Sexist Religion", Mary Daly (1972)
- "Action Committee on Decent Childcare", from Women: A Journal of Liberation (1972)
- "A History of International Women's Day" from Womankind (1972)
- "Chicago Maternity Center: 77 Years of Home Deliveries...Will This Be Its Last?", Alice from Womankind (1972)
- "Chicago Women's Liberation Union" from Women: A Journal of Liberation, Naomi Weisstein and Vivian Rothstein (1972)
- "Cleaning Up", Mary Blake from Womankind (1972)
- "Covert Sex Discrimination Against Women as Medical Patients", Carol Downer (1972)
- "DARE Challenges City Hall Budget" (1972)
- "Don't Think", from Womankind (1972)
- "Equal Rights and Opportunities for Women [in the Navy]", Admiral Zumwalt (1972)
- "Family Relations Court", Alice from Womankind (1972)
- Feminist Studies (1972–present)
- "Half of China" from Womankind, Elaine (1972)
- "Indochina Peace Campaign" from Womankind (1972)
- Inochi no Onna-tachie: Torimidashi uman ribu ron, in English For My Spiritual Sisters: A Disorderly Theory of Women's Liberation, Mitsu Tanaka (1972)
- "I Want a Wife" from Ms., Judy Syfers (1972)
- "I Want to Pick Your Brains", Ruth Carol (1972)
- "Jewish Women Call For a Change", Ezrat Nashim (1972)
- "Lesbian Mothers and Their Children" from Womankind (1972)
- "Lesbians in Revolt: Male Supremacy Quakes and Quivers", Charlotte Bunch (1972)
- Lesbian/Woman, Del Martin and Phyllis Lyon (1972)
- Memoirs of an Ex-Prom Queen, Alix Kates Shulman (1972)
- "NOW Press Release on City Hall Gender Discrimination" (1972)
- Novas Cartas Portuguesas, in English New Portuguese Letters, Maria Isabel Barreno, Maria Teresa Horta, Maria Velho da Costa (1972)
- "On Being a Waitress", Carolyn (1972)
- "One Small Step for Genkind", Casey Miller and Kate Swift (1972)
- "Our Output = Their Income" from Womankind (1972)
- "Rape" from Womankind (1972)
- "Sex or, Hey, I Thought This Was Supposed to be Fun!" from Womankind, Cathy (1972)
- "Socialist Feminism", Chicago Women's Liberation Union (1972)
- "Soldiers in the Streets" from Womankind (1972)
- Surfacing, Margaret Atwood (1972)
- "That Old Problem – Sex" from Womankind, Lorna (1972)
- The Coming of Lilith, Judith Plaskow (1972)
- "The DARE Janitress Campaign" from Womankind (1972)
- "The Emancipation of Man", Olof Palme (1972)
- "The Fear of Childbirth is a PAIN", from Womankind (1972)
- The Feminist Art Journal (1972-1977)
- "The Feminization of Society", Yoko Ono (1972)
- "The Lesbian and God-the-Father, or, All the Church Needs Is a Good Lay . . . On Its Side", Sally Miller Gearhart (1972)
- "The Tyranny of Structurelessness", Joreen (1972)
- "Tum'ah and Toharah: Ends and Beginnings", Rachel Adler (1972)
- "Viet Nam: The Voice of Song Will Rise Above the Sound of the Bombs" from Womankind, Eileen Kreutz (1972)
- "WATCH Demands", WATCH (1972)
- "WATCH: Save the Chicago Maternity Center" (1972)
- "We Have Had Abortions", published in Ms. (1972)
- "Welfare is a Women's Issue", by Johnnie Tillmon, published in Ms. (1972)
- "We Look At Ms.", Sue (1972)
- "When We Dead Awaken: Writing as Re-Vision", Adrienne Rich (1972)
- Women and Madness, Phyllis Chesler (1972)
- "Women in a Socialist Society", Women's Union, Young Lords Party (1972)
- Women of La Raza Unite! (1972)
- Women's Studies Quarterly (1972–present)
- "Abortion Task Force: Who We Are" from Womankind (1973)
- Beyond God the Father: Toward a Philosophy of Women's Liberation, Mary Daly (1973)
- Fear of Flying, Erica Jong (1973)
- Lesbian Nation: The Feminist Solution, Jill Johnston (1973)
- "Letter from the Abortion Defense Fund" (1973)
- "Me and Them Sirens Running All Night Long", Susan Cavin (1973)
- "Mom on a Hook" from Womankind (1973)
- "On Separatism", Lee Schwing (1973)
- Our Bodies, Ourselves, The Boston Women's Health Book Collective (1973)
- "Posters that Express the Reality of Being a Woman", Linda Winer (1973)
- "Rape", Adrienne Rich (1973)
- "So Who Needs Daycare?" from Womankind, Mary M. (1973)
- The Furies, The Furies Collective (January 1972 until mid-1973)
- "The Jane Song", Elizabeth Roberts (1973)
- "The National Black Feminist Organization's Statement of Purpose" (1973)
- "The Status of Women in Halakhic Judaism", Saul Berman (1973)
- "The Verbal Karate of Florynce R. Kennedy, Esq.", Gloria Steinem (1973)
- "The Women Men Don't See", James Tiptree, Jr. (pen name of Alice Bradley Sheldon) (1973)
- "Vacuum Aspiration Abortion", Health Organizing Collective of Women's Health and Abortion Project (1973)
- "When I Was Growing Up", Nellie Wong (1973)
- Witches, Midwives, and Nurses: A History of Women Healers, Barbara Ehrenreich and Deirdre English (1973)
- "Abortion--the Need to Change Jewish Law", Rachel Adler (1974)
- All We're Meant to Be: A Biblical Approach to Women's Liberation, Letha Dawson Scanzoni and Nancy A. Hardesty (1974)
- "A Young Woman's Death: Would Health Rights Have Prevented It?", Helen Rodriquez-Trias (1974)
- "Feminism, a Cause for the Halachic", Rachel Adler (1974)
- "Feminism, Art, and My Mother Sylvia", Andrea Dworkin (1974)
- "In Search of Our Mother's Gardens: The Creativity of Black Women in the South", from Ms., Alice Walker (1974)
- "Is Female to Male as Nature Is to Culture?", Sherry Ortner (1974)
- "Marxism, Mariategui and the Women's Movement", Catalina Adrianzen (1974)
- "Mother Right: A New Feminist Theory", Jane Alpert (1974)
- Speculum of the Other Woman, Luce Irigaray (1974)
- "What Educated Women Can Do", Indira Gandhi (1974)
- Woman Hating: A Radical Look at Sexuality, Andrea Dworkin (1974)
- "A Black Feminist's Search For Sisterhood", Michele Wallace (1975)
- Abortion is a Blessing, Anne Nicol Gaylor (1975)
- Against Our Will, Susan Brownmiller (1975)
- "DAR II (Dykes for the Second American Revolution)" (1975)
- "Feminist Economic Alliance Formed to Aid New Sister Credit Unions" (1975)
- Hecate (1975–present)
- "How to Discriminate Against Women Without Really Trying" from Women: A Feminist Perspective, Joreen (1975)
- Judaism and the New Woman, Sally Priesand (1975)
- "Lesbian Group [1975 Conference Report]" (1975)
- "Lesbian Pride", Andrea Dworkin (1975)
- Reaching Beyond Intellect, Hallie Iglehart and Jeanne Scott-Senior (1975)
- Signs: Journal of Women in Culture and Society (1975–present)
- "Stand Up and Be Counted", Secret Storm (1975)
- The Female Imagination, Patricia Meyer Spacks (1975)
- The Female Man, Joanna Russ (1975)
- "The Legal Bias Against Rape Victims (The Rape of Mr. Smith)," Connie K. Borkenhagen (1975)
- "The Root Cause", Andrea Dworkin (1975)
- "The Traffic in Women: Notes on the "Political Economy" of Sex," Gayle Rubin (1975)
- "Toward a Phenomenology of Feminist Consciousness," Sandra Bartky (1975)
- "Visual Pleasure and Narrative Cinema," Laura Mulvey (1975)
- Wages Against Housework, Silvia Federici (1975)
- "What is Women's Liberation?", Secret Storm (1975)
- "What Medical Students Learn", Kay Weiss (1975)
- Woman's Evolution: From Matriarchal Clan to Patriarchal Family, Evelyn Reed (1975)
- "You Are Where You Eat", Laura Shapiro (1975)
- "A Feminist Tarot", Sally Miller Gearhart and Susan Rennie (1976)
- Al-Raida (1976–present)
- Black Macho and the Myth of the Superwoman, Michele Wallace (1976)
- Blazing Star Vol. 2 No. 1 (July 1976)
- Blazing Star Vol. 2 No. 3 (October 1976)
- Camera Obscura (1976–present)
- "Female God Language in a Jewish Context", Rita Gross (1976)
- "Feminism: Is it Good for the Jews?", Blu Greenberg (1976)
- "Is the Women's Movement in Trouble?" from Working Papers on Socialism & Feminism, Roberta Lynch (1976)
- Kinflicks, Lisa Alther (1976)
- "Learning From Lesbian Separatism", Charlotte Bunch (1976)
- Literary Women, Ellen Moers (1976)
- Lover, Bertha Harris (1976)
- Of Woman Born: Motherhood as Experience and Institution, Adrienne Rich (1976)
- "Medical Crimes Against Women", Jenny Knauss, Janet M., Kathy Mallin, Lauren Crawford and Sharon M. (1976)
- Meridian, Alice Walker (1976)
- Our blood: prophecies and discourses on sexual politics, Andrea Dworkin (1976)
- "The Laugh of the Medusa", Hélène Cixous (1976)
- The Mermaid and the Minotaur: Sexual Arrangement and Human Malaise, Dorothy Dinnerstein (1976)
- "What Became of God the Mother? Conflicting Images of God in Early Christianity", Elaine H. Pagels (1976)
- "What is Socialist Feminism?", Barbara Ehrenreich (1976)
- When God Was a Woman, Merlin Stone (1976)
- Woman on the Edge of Time, Marge Piercy (1976)
- Women, Money and Power, Phyllis Chesler with Emily Jane Goodman (1976)
- "Women's Liberation Builds Strong Bodies in Many Ways", Secret Storm (c. 1976)
- "Women Talk Back", Secret Storm (c. 1976)
- Words and Women: A New Language in New Times by Casey Miller, Kate Swift (1976)
- "A Black Feminist Statement", Combahee River Collective (1977)
- "Biological Superiority: The World's Most Dangerous and Deadly Idea", Andrea Dworkin (1977)
- "Claiming an Education", Adrienne Rich (1977)
- "Declaration of American Women", The President's Interagency Council on Women National Plan of Action (1977)
- "How Can a Little Girl Like You Teach a Big Class of Men?", Naomi Weisstein (1977)
- Egalias døtre (in English Egalia's Daughters), by Gerd Brantenberg (1977)
- "Left-Wing Anti-Feminism: A Revisionist Disorder", Marlene Dixon (1977)
- "Marx and Gandhi were Liberals: Feminism and the 'Radical' Left", Andrea Dworkin (1977)
- "Monopoly Capitalism and the Women's Movement", Marlene Dixon (1977)
- "On the Super-Exploitation of Women", Marlene Dixon (1977)
- "Pornography: The New Terrorism" Andrea Dworkin (1977)
- Sex Bias in the U.S. Code, United States Commission on Civil Rights (1977)
- "The Last Mile", Edith Grinnell (1977)
- "The Prostitute: Paradigmatic Woman", Julia P. Stanley (1977)
- "The Rise and Demise of Women's Liberation: A Class Analysis", Marlene Dixon (1977)
- "The Simple Story of a Lesbian Girlhood", Andrea Dworkin (1977)
- "The Sisterhood Rip-Off: The Destruction of the Left in the Professional Women's Caucuses", Marlene Dixon (1977)
- "The Subjugation of Women Under Capitalism: The Bourgeois Morality", Marlene Dixon (1977)
- The Women's Room, Marilyn French (1977)
- This Sex Which Is Not One, Luce Irigaray (1977)
- "Wages for Housework and Strategies of Revolutionary Fantasy", Marlene Dixon (1977)
- Who really starves?: Women and world hunger, Lisa Leghorn and Mary Roodkowsky (1977)
- Women's Studies in Communication (1977–present)
- "A Feminist Looks at Saudi Arabia", Andrea Dworkin (1978)
- "Art Hysterical Notions of Progress and Culture", Valerie Jaudon and Joyce Kozloff (1978)
- Capitalist Patriarchy and the Case for Socialist Feminism, collection of essays anthologized by Zillah R. Eisenstein (1978)
- "Consciousness-Raising: A Radical Weapon", Kathie Sarachild (1978)
- Crystal Eastman on Women and Revolution, edited by Blanche Wiesen Cook (1978)
- "Fat is A Feminist Issue", Susie Orbach (1978)
- "Full Employment: Toward Economic Equality For Women", Joreen (1978)
- Gyn/Ecology: The Metaethics of Radical Feminism, Mary Daly (1978)
- "On the National Black Feminist Organization", Michele Wallace (1978)
- "The New Woman's Broken Heart", Andrea Dworkin (1978)
- The Sadeian Woman and the Ideology of Pornography, Angela Carter (1978)
- "The Wander-ground", Sally Miller Gearhart (1978)
- "Uses of the Erotic: The Erotic as Power", Audre Lorde (1978)
- "Why So-called Radical Men Love and Need Pornography", Andrea Dworkin (1978)
- "Why Women Need the Goddess", Carol P. Christ (1978)
- X: A Fabulous Child's Story, Lois Gould (1978)
- "Classical and Baroque Sex in Everyday Life", Ellen Willis (1979)
- "Let's Put Pornography Back in the Closet" from Newsday, Susan Brownmiller (1979)
- On Lies, Secrets and Silence, Adrienne Rich (1979)
- Opera: The Undoing of Women, Catherine Clément (1979)
- Sexual harassment of working women: a case of sex discrimination, Catharine MacKinnon (1979)
- The Bloody Chamber, Angela Carter (1979)
- "The Double Standard of Aging", Susan Sontag (1979)
- "The Lie", Andrea Dworkin (1979)
- The Madwoman in the Attic, Sandra Gilbert and Susan Gubar (1979)
- "The Night and Danger", Andrea Dworkin (1979)
- "35% of Puerto Rican Women Sterilized", Committee for Puerto Rican Decolonization (late 1970s)
- "The Tyranny of Tyranny", Cathy Levine (1979)
- Woman and Nature: The Roaring Inside Her, Susan Griffin (1979)
- Womanspirit Rising: A Feminist Reader in Religion edited by Carol P. Christ and Judith Plaskow (1979)
- Women and Household Labor, Sarah Fenstermaker Berk, ed. (1979)

=== 1980s ===
- "A Woman Writer and Pornography", Andrea Dworkin (1980)
- "Compulsory Heterosexuality and Lesbian Existence", Adrienne Rich (1980)
- Man Made Language, Dale Spender (1980)
- The Sceptical Feminist: A Philosophical Enquiry, Janet Radcliffe Richards (1980)
- The Handbook of Nonsexist Writing, Casey Miller and Kate Swift (1980)
- The New Woman's Broken Heart: Short Stories, Andrea Dworkin (1980)
- "True Liberation of Women", Indira Gandhi (1980)
- "What Would a Non-Sexist City Look Like? Speculations on Housing, Urban Design, and Human Work", Dolores Hayden
- "Women and Urban Policy", Joreen (1980)
- Ain't I a Woman? Black Women and Feminism, bell hooks (1981)
- "Nature's Revenge", Ellen Willis (1981)
- "Pornography and Male Supremacy", Andrea Dworkin (1981)
- Pornography: Men Possessing Women, Andrea Dworkin (1981)
- "Pornography's Part in Sexual Violence", Andrea Dworkin (1981)
- "The ACLU: Bait and Switch", Andrea Dworkin (1981)
- This Bridge Called My Back: Writings by Radical Women of Color, Cherrie Moraga and Gloria Anzaldúa (1981)
- "Toward A Feminist Jurisprudence", Ann C. Scales (1981)
- "Why Pornography Matters to Feminists", Andrea Dworkin (1981)
- Women, Race and Class, Angela Davis (1981)
- Against Sadomasochism: A Radical Feminist Analysis, edited by Robin Ruth Linden, Darlene R. Pagano, Diana E. H. Russell, and Susan Leigh Star (1982)
- All the Women Are White, All the Blacks Are Men, But Some of Us Are Brave: Black Women's Studies, edited by Akasha Gloria Hull, Patricia Bell-Scott, and Barbara Smith (1982)
- Feministische Studien (lit. 'feminist studies'; 1982–present)
- Hypatia: A Journal of Feminist Philosophy (1982–present)
- In a Different Voice: Psychological Theory and Women's Development, Carol Gilligan (1982)
- Invisible Women: The Schooling Scandal, Dale Spender (1982)
- Powers of Horror, Julia Kristeva (1982)
- The Anatomy of Freedom, Robin Morgan (1982)
- The Color Purple, Alice Walker (1982)
- "The Importance of Women's Paid Labour: Women at Work in World War II", Lynn Beaton (1982)
- Zami: A New Spelling of My Name, Audre Lorde (1982)
- Feminist Theorists: Three Centuries of Key Women Thinkers, Dale Spender, ed. (1983)
- For Love or Money, a Pictorial History of Women and Work in Australia, Megan McMurchy, Margot Oliver and Jeni Thornley (1983)
- Home Girls, various authors (1983)
- How to Suppress Women's Writing, Joanna Russ (1983)
- In Search of Our Mothers' Gardens: Womanist Prose, Alice Walker (1983)
- "I've Had Nothing Yet, So I Can't Take More", Rachel Adler (1983)
- Outrageous Acts and Everyday Rebellions, Gloria Steinem (1983)
- Right Wing Women: The Politics of Domesticated Females, Andrea Dworkin (1983)
- Sexism and God-Talk: Toward a Feminist Theology, Rosemary Radford Ruether (1983)
- The Politics of Reality: Essays in Feminist Theory, Marilyn Frye (1983)
- There's Always Been a Women's Movement in the Twentieth Century, Dale Spender (1983)
- "Whose Press? Whose Freedom?", Andrea Dworkin (1983)
- "Comparable Worth" from In These Times, Joreen (1984)
- "Female Rabbis, Male Fears", Chaim Sedler-Feller (1984)
- In Search of Answers: Indian Women's Voices, Madhu Kishwar and Ruth Vanita (1984)
- Feminist Theory: From Margin to Center, bell hooks (1984)
- "I Want a Twenty-Four-Hour Truce During Which There is No Rape", Andrea Dworkin (1984)
- Native Tongue, Suzette Haden Elgin (1984)
- Pure Lust: Elemental Feminist Philosophy, Mary Daly (1984)
- Sisterhood Is Global: The International Women's Movement Anthology, edited by Robin Morgan (1984)
- Sister Outsider, Audre Lorde (1984)
- The Man of Reason: 'Male' and 'Female' in Western Philosophy, Genevieve Lloyd (1984)
- "The Missing Rib: The Forgotten Place of Queens and Priestesses in the Establishment of Zion", Margaret Toscano (1984)
- "Against the Male Flood: Censorship, Pornography and Equality", Andrea Dworkin (1985)
- "A Manifesto for Cyborgs: Science, Technology, and Socialist Feminism in the 1980s", Donna Haraway (1985)
- "A Person Paper on Purity in Language", William Satire (pen name of Douglas Richard Hofstadter) (1985)
- Australian Feminist Studies (1985–present)
- Beyond Power: On Women, Men, and Morals, Marilyn French (1985)
- "Breaking With Invisibility", Cady (1985)
- For the Record: The Making and Meaning of Feminist Knowledge, Dale Spender (1985)
- "Loving Books: Male/Female/Feminist" from Hot Wire, Andrea Dworkin (1985)
- Magic Mommas, Trembling Sisters, Puritans and Perverts: Feminist Essays, Joanna Russ (1985)
- "Shifting Horizons", Lynn Beaton (1985)
- The Handmaid's Tale, Margaret Atwood (1985)
- The Reasons Why: Essays on the New Civil Rights Law Recognizing Pornography as Sex Discrimination, Andrea Dworkin and Catharine MacKinnon (1985)
- Blood, Bread, and Poetry: Select Prose (1979–1985), Adrienne Rich (1986)
- Feminism and Nationalism in the Third World, Kumari Jayawardena (1986)
- Feminist Studies, Critical Studies, Teresa de Lauretis (1986)
- "Gender: A Useful Category of Historical Analysis", Joan Wallach Scott (1986)
- Ice and Fire, Andrea Dworkin (1986)
- "If Men Could Menstruate" from Ms., Gloria Steinem (1986)
- "Letter from a War Zone", Andrea Dworkin (1986)
- Mothers on Trial: The Battle for Children and Custody, Phyllis Chesler (1986)
- Agenda (1987–present)
- Borderlands/La Frontera: The New Mestiza, Gloria Anzaldúa (1987)
- Feminism Unmodified: Discourses on Life and Law, Catharine MacKinnon (1987)
- Intercourse, Andrea Dworkin (1987)
- Landscape for a Good Woman, Carolyn Kay Steedman (1987)
- Making it: A Woman's Guide to Sex in the Age of AIDS, Cindy Patton and Janis Kelly (1987)
- Reconstructing Womanhood, Hazel Carby (1987)
- The Great Cosmic Mother: Rediscovering the Religion of the Earth, Monica Sjoo and Barbara Mor (1987)
- "Voyage in the Dark: Hers and Ours", Andrea Dworkin (1987)
- Websters' First New Intergalactic Wickedary of the English Language, Conjured in Cahoots with Jane Caputi, Mary Daly, Jane Caputi and Sudie Rakusin (1987)
- "Who You Know Versus Who You Represent: Feminist Influence in the Democratic and Republican Parties", Joreen (1987)
- Feminism and Anthropology, Henrietta Moore (1988)
- Feminist Activities at the 1988 Republican Convention, Joreen (1988)
- Feminist Formations (1988–present)
- Feminist Literary History, Janet Todd (1988)
- "Handle With Care: We Need a Child-Rearing Movement", Ellen Willis (1988)
- If Women Counted: A New Feminist Economics, Marilyn Waring (1988)
- Lesbian Ethics: Toward New Value, Sarah Lucia Hoagland (1988)
- Pornography and Civil Rights: A New Day for Women's Equality, Andrea Dworkin and Catharine MacKinnon (1988)
- "Social Revolution and the Equal Rights Amendment", Joreen (1988)
- The Heidi Chronicles, Wendy Wasserstein (1988)
- "Women at the 1988 Democratic Convention", Joreen (1988)
- The Women's History of the World, Rosalind Miles (1989)
- A Vindication of The Rights of Whores, edited by Gail Pheterson (1989)
- Bananas, Beaches and Bases: Making Feminist Sense of International Politics, Cynthia Enloe (1989)
- Dancing at the Edge of the World, Ursula K. Le Guin (1989)
- Differences: A Journal of Feminist Cultural Studies (1989–present)
- Gender Trouble: Feminism and the Subversion of Identity, Judith Butler (1989)
- Letters from a War Zone: Writings, 1976–1989, Andrea Dworkin (1989)
- Makaan, Paigham Afaqui (1989)
- "Men, Women and Biblical Equality", Christians for Biblical Equality (1989)
- "More Than 100 Million Women Are Missing", Amartya Sen (1989)
- "Presenting...Sister No Blues", Hattie Gossett (1989)
- "Sexuality, Pornography, and Method: 'Pleasure Under Patriarchy'", Catharine MacKinnon (1989)
- The End of This Day's Business, Katharine Burdekin (1989)
- The Second Shift: Working Parents and the Revolution at Home, Arlie Russell Hochschild and Anne Machung (1989)
- The Temple of My Familiar, Alice Walker (1989)
- The Writing or the Sex?, Or, Why You Don't Have to Read Women's Writing to Know It's No Good, Dale Spender (1989)
- Toward a Feminist Theory of the State, Catharine MacKinnon (1989)
- "What Battery Really Is", Andrea Dworkin (1989)
- Weaving the Visions: New Patterns in Feminist Spirituality, edited by Carol P. Christ and Judith Plaskow (1989)
- "Women, Sex, & Rock 'n' Roll", by Terri Sutton (1989)
- Satellites Out of Orbit, Chris Wind (1988)

=== 1990s ===
- Dominant Constructions of Women and Nature in Social Science Literature, Brinda Rao (1991)
- "What is Riot Grrrl?" (early 1990s)
- Black Feminist Thought: Knowledge, Consciousness and the Politics of Empowerment, Patricia Hill Collins (1990)
- Daring to Be Bad: Radical Feminism in America, 1967–1975, Alice Echols (1990)
- "God Is a Woman and She Is Growing Older", Margaret Wenig (1990)
- Journal of Women, Politics & Policy (1990–present)
- Mercy, Andrea Dworkin (1990)
- The Sexual Politics of Meat: A Feminist-Vegetarian Critical Theory, Carol J. Adams (1990)
- "Who Says We Haven't Made a Revolution?: A Feminist Takes Stock", Vivian Gornick (1990)
- "Will There Be Orthodox Women Rabbis?", Blu Greenberg (1990)
- "A Brief History of the Association for Women in Mathematics: The Presidents' Perspectives", Lenore Blum (1991)
- Backlash: The Undeclared War Against American Women, Susan Faludi (1991)
- Dirty Weekend, Helen Zahavi (1991)
- Feminism & Psychology (1991–present)
- "How 'Sex' Got Into Title VII: Persistent Opportunism as a Maker of Public Policy", Joreen (1991)
- "Justice Is a Woman with a Sword", D. A. Clarke (1991)
- "Riot Grrrl Manifesto" from Bikini Kill Zine 2, Kathleen Hanna (1991)
- Sexo y filosofía: sobre "mujer" y "poder", Amelia Valcárcel (1991)
- Sexual/Textual Politics, Toril Moi (1991)
- Standing Again at Sinai: Judaism from a Feminist Perspective, Judith Plaskow (1991)
- "Terror, Torture, and Resistance", Andrea Dworkin (1991)
- The Beauty Myth, Naomi Wolf (1991)
- "The Egg and the Sperm: How Science Has Constructed a Romance Based on Stereotypical Male-Female Roles", Emily Martin (1991)
- "We Learned the Wrong Lessons in Vietnam: A Feminist Issue Still", Kate Millett, Robin Morgan, Gloria Steinem and Ti-Grace Atkinson (1991)
- "With No Immediate Cause", Ntozake Shange (1991)
- Writing War: Fiction, Gender & Memory, Lynne Hanley (1991)
- "Becoming the Third Wave", Rebecca Walker (1992)
- Daughters of Africa: An International Anthology of Words and Writings by Women of African Descent, edited by Margaret Busby (1992)
- Jabo na kena? Jabo, Taslima Nasrin (1992)
- Men, Women, and Chain Saws: Gender in the Modern Horror Film, Carol J. Clover (1992)
- Naree, Humayun Azad (1992)
- Nirbachito Column, Taslima Nasrin (1992)
- Outercourse: The Bedazzling Voyage, Containing Recollections from My Logbook of a Radical Feminist Philosopher, Mary Daly (1992)
- Possessing the Secret of Joy, Alice Walker (1992)
- "Power, Resistance and Science", Naomi Weisstein (1992)
- "Prostitution and Male Supremacy", Andrea Dworkin (1992)
- Race, Class and Gender in the U.S., Paula Rothenberg (1992)
- "Replacements", Lisa Tuttle (1992)
- Revolution from Within: A Book of Self-Esteem, Gloria Steinem (1992)
- "Talking Our Way In", Rachel Adler (1992)
- The Mismeasure of Woman: Why Women Are Not the Better Sex, the Opposite Sex, or the Inferior Sex, Carol Tavris (1992)
- The Straight Mind and Other Essays, Monique Wittig (1992)
- The War Against Women, Marilyn French (1992)
- "Women and Authority: Re-emerging Mormon Feminism", edited by Maxine Hanks (1992)
- Women of Ideas and What Men Have Done to Them: From Aphra Behn to Adrienne Rich, Dale Spender (1992)
- Women Who Run With the Wolves : Myths and Stories of the Wild Woman Archetype, Clarissa Pinkola Estes (1992)
- "Are Opinions Male?", Naomi Wolf (1993)
- "A Soldier Is a Soldier", Rosemary Bryant Mariner (1993)
- Ecofeminism and the Sacred, Carol J. Adams (1993)
- "Ecofeminism: Toward Global Justice and Planetary Health", Greta Gaard and Lori Gruen (1993)
- "Feminism Versus Family Values: Women at the 1992 Democratic and Republican Conventions", Joreen (1993)
- Fire with Fire: The New Female Power And How It Will Change the 21st Century, Naomi Wolf (1993)
- "In Your Blood, Live: Re-visions of a Theology of Purity", Rachel Adler (1993)
- "Not Just Bad Sex", Katha Pollitt (1993)
- Only Words, Catharine MacKinnon (1993)
- The Feminist Chronicles (1993), Toni Carabillo, June Csidan and Judith Meuli
- The Politics of Individualism: Liberalism, Liberal Feminism, and Anarchism, L. Susan Brown (1993)
- Unbearable Weight: Feminism, Western Culture, and the Body, Susan Bordo (1993)
- Warrior Marks: Female Genital Mutilation and the Sexual Blinding of Women, Alice Walkernand Pratibha Parmar (1993)
- Feminism: The Essential Historical Writings, Miriam Schneir (1994)
- Gaia and God: An Ecofeminist Theology of Earth Healing, Rosemary Radford Ruether (1994)
- Gender Outlaw, Kate Bornstein (1994)
- Mother Journeys: Feminists Write About Mothering, Maureen T. Reddy, Martha Roth and Amy Sheldon (1994)
- Neither Man nor Beast: Feminism and the Defense of Animals, Carol J. Adams (1994)
- Nine Parts of Desire, Geraldine Brooks (1994)
- Prozac Nation, Elizabeth Wurtzel (1994)
- Religion, Feminism, and Freedom of Conscience, edited by George D. Smith (1994)
- Skin: Talking About Sex, Class & Literature, Dorothy Allison (1994)
- "Suffragette City: The Chicago Women's Liberation Rock Band", Ben Kim (1994)
- The Creation of Feminist Consciousness: From the Middle Ages to 1870, Gerda Lerner (1994)
- "The Unremembered: Searching for Women at the Holocaust Memorial Museum", Andrea Dworkin (1994)
- "Why Women Need Freedom from Religion", Annie Laurie Gaylor (1994)
- Feminist Economics (1995–present)
- From Suffrage to Women's Liberation: Feminism in Twentieth Century America, Joreen (1995)
- "From the Back Alleys to the Supreme Court and Beyond", Dorothy Fadiman (1995)
- Listen Up: Voices from the Next Feminist Generation, edited by Barbara Findlen (1995)
- Massacre of the Dreamers: Essays on Xicanisma, Ana Castillo (1995)
- "Memoirs of a Feminist Therapist", Joan Saks Berman (1995)
- Nattering on the Net: Women, Power and Cyberspace, Dale Spender (1995)
- "On the Origins of the Women's Liberation Movement from a Strictly Personal Perspective", Joreen (1995)
- "Plenary Address of the Fourth World Conference on Women", Bella Abzug (1995)
- Pythagoras' Trousers: God, Physics, and the Gender Wars, Margaret Wertheim (1995)
- "The Power of the Word: Culture, Censorship and Voice", Meredith Tax with Marjorie Agosin, Ama Ata Aidoo, Ritu Menon, Ninotchka Rosca, and Mariella Sala (1995)
- "The Revolution for Women in Law and Public Policy", Joreen (1995)
- "The Sexual Politics of Interpersonal Behavior", Nancy Henley and Joreen (1995)
- To Be Real, edited by Rebecca Walker (1995)
- "(Untimely) Critiques for a Red Feminism", Teresa Ebert (1995)
- Where the Girls Are: Growing Up Female with the Mass Media, Susan J. Douglas (1994)
- Animals and Women: Feminist Theoretical Explorations, Carol J. Adams and Josephine Donovan (1994)
- Making Stories, Making Selves: Feminist Reflections on the Holocaust, R. Ruth Linden (1995)
- "Women and Aids", Donna Shalala (1995)
- "Women and Health Security", Hillary Clinton (1995)
- Words of Fire: An Anthology of African-American Feminist Thought, Beverly Guy-Sheftall (ed.) (1995)
- "A Good Rape", Andrea Dworkin (1996)
- "Barred From the Bar – A History of Women and the Legal Profession", Hedda Garza (1996)
- "Beijing Report: The Fourth World Conference on Women" from off our backs, Joreen (1996)
- "Days of Celebration and Resistance: The Chicago Women's Liberation Rock Band, 1970-1973", Naomi Weisstein (1996)
- n.paradoxa: international feminist art journal (1996–present)
- "Remarks to Wellesley College Class of 1996" (commencement speech), Nora Ephron (1996)
- The Stronger Women Get, the More Men Love Football: Sexism and the Culture of Sport, Mariah Burton Nelson (1994)
- The Vagina Monologues, Eve Ensler (1996)
- "U.N. Reviews Women's Progress One Year After Beijing" from off our backs, Joreen (1996)
- "Waves of Feminism", Joreen (1996)
- "We've Come a Long Way...?", Joreen (1996)
- "Whatever Happened to Republican Feminists?", Joreen (1996)
- "What's In a Name? Does It Matter How the Equal Rights Amendment is Worded?", Joreen (1996)
- "Womb for Rent: Surrogate Motherhood and the Case of Baby M", Anita Silvers and Sterling Harwood, in Sterling Harwood, ed., Business as Ethical and Business as Usual, pp. 190–193. (1996)
- "Change and Continuity for Women at the 1996 Republican and Democratic Conventions", Joreen (1997)
- In Harm's Way: The Pornography Civil Rights Hearings, Catharine MacKinnon (1997)
- Life and Death: Unapologetic Writings on the Continuing War against Women, Andrea Dworkin (1997)
- Feminist Approaches to Art Therapy, Susan Hogan (1997)
- "Power, Resistance and Science: A Call for a Revitalized Feminist Psychology", Naomi Weisstein (1997)
- "Remarks on Naomi Weisstein", Jesse Lemisch and Naomi Weisstein (1997)
- "Selected Quotes From Women Without Superstition: No Gods – No Masters", Annie Laurie Gaylor (ed.) (1997)
- The Invention of Women: Making an African Sense of Western Gender Discourses, Oyeronke Oyewumi (1997)
- Who's Afraid of Feminism?: Seeing Through the Backlash, edited by Julie Mitchell and Ann Oakley (1997)
- And Who Will Make the Chapatis?, edited by Bishakha Datta (1998)
- Bitch: In Praise of Difficult Women, Elizabeth Wurtzel (1998)
- Cunt: A Declaration of Independence, Inga Muscio (1998)
- "Dear Bill and Hillary", Andrea Dworkin (1998)
- Letters to a Young Feminist, Phyllis Chesler (1998)
- "Marxist Feminism / Materialist Feminism", Martha E. Gimenez (1998)
- "Mother Wit", Ellen Willis (1998)
- Saman, Ayu Utami (1998)
- "Seneca Falls Anniversary Speech", Hillary Clinton (1998)
- Sex and Social Justice, Martha Nussbaum (1998)
- "She Said" from Calyx, Judith Arcana (1998)
- The Economics of Gender, Joyce P. Jacobson (1998)
- The Last Suffragist, Ellen DuBois (1998)
- "The Magnolia Street Commune", Vivian Rothstein (1998)
- "The Religious War Against Women", Annie Laurie Gaylor (1998)
- "Three Pieces About Abortion" from Calyx and Hurricane Alice, Judith Arcana (1998)
- Tipping the Velvet, Sarah Waters (1998)
- Quintessence... Realizing the Archaic Future: A Radical Elemental Feminist Manifesto, Mary Daly (1998)
- Upanibesh, Sarojini Sahoo (1998)
- "When Men Were Men", bell hooks (1998)
- Why So Slow? The Advancement of Women, Virginia Valian (1998)
- "Abortion and the Underground", Cheryl Terhor (1999)
- "Ain't She Still a Woman?", bell hooks (1999)
- "Are Women Human?", Catharine MacKinnon (1999)
- "Are You Listening, Hillary? President Rape Is Who He Is", Andrea Dworkin (1999)
- "Chicago Was at Center of Feminist Activities", Angela Bonavoglia (1999)
- "CWLU Work Groups and Personal Transformation", Sue Davenport, Paula Kamen, and the CWLU Herstory Committee (1999)
- Dragon Ladies: Asian American Feminists Breathe Fire, Sonia Shah (ed.) (1999)
- Engendering Judaism: An Inclusive Theology and Ethics, Rachel Adler (1999)
- "Feminism, Moralism, and That Woman", Ellen Willis (1999)
- "Founding and Sustaining a Women's Studies Program", Judith Kegan Gardiner (1999)
- International Feminist Journal of Politics (1999–present)
- "Jo Freeman (also known as Joreen)", Jennifer Scanlon (1999)
- "Monica and Barbara and Primal Concerns", Ellen Willis (1999)
- "Our Gang of Four: Friendships and Women's Liberation", Amy Kesselman with Heather Booth, Vivian Rothstein, and Naomi Weisstein (1999)
- "Penis Passion", bell hooks (1999)
- Pratibandi, Sarojini Sahoo (1999)
- "Sex, Race, Religion, and Partisan Alignment", Joreen (1999)
- "Sisters Against the System", Cara Jepson (1999)
- Stiffed: The Betrayal of the American Man, Susan Faludi (1999)
- The Australian Feminist Law Journal (1999–present)
- "The Chicago Women's Liberation Union: An Introduction", Margaret "Peg" Strobel and Sue Davenport (1999)
- "The China Project, the Prison Project and the Issues of Class and Race", Marie "Micki" Leaner, Paula Kamen and the CWLU Herstory Committee (1999)
- "The Day I Was Drugged and Raped", Andrea Dworkin (1999)
- "The Green Highway Theater Press Release [concerning the play Jane: Abortion and the Underground]", Paula Kamen (1999)
- The Whole Woman, Germaine Greer (1999)
- Travail, Genre et Sociétés (1999–present)
- "What Was the Chicago Women's Liberation Union?", Becky Kluchin (1999)

== 21st century ==
=== 2000s ===
- Feminism Is for Everybody: Passionate Politics, bell hooks (2000)
- Feminist Theory (2000–present)
- Manifesta: Young women, Feminism and the Future, Jennifer Baumgardner and Amy Richards (2000)
- Scapegoat: The Jews, Israel, and Women's Liberation, Andrea Dworkin (2000)
- "Shakespeare's Sonnets and the Mystique of the Sheikh", Annie Laurie Gaylor (2000)
- "The Color of Violence Against Women", Angela Davis (2000)
- The Frailty Myth, Colette Dowling (2000)
- The World Split Open: How the Modern Women's Movement Changed America, Ruth Rosen (2000)
- Feminist Media Studies (2001–present)
- "As a Feminist, This "Jane" Was Far from Plain", Chris Lombardi and Ruth Surgal (2002)
- Feminist Africa (2002–present)
- "Feminist Judaism: Past and Future", Rachel Adler (2002)
- Fingersmith, Sarah Waters (2002)
- Heartbreak: The Political Memoir of a Feminist Militant, Andrea Dworkin (2002)
- Off the Beaten Track: Rethinking Gender Justice for Indian Women, Madhu Kishwar (2002)
- Stolen Sunshine: A Woman's Quest for Herself, Smita Jhavar (2002)
- "The Logic of Experience: Reflections on the Development of Sexual Harassment Law", Catharine MacKinnon (2002)
- Aftermath: Violence and the Remaking of a Self, Susan J. Brison (2003)
- Gender Talk: The Struggle for Equality in African American Communities, Beverly Guy-Sheftall and Johnnetta B. Cole (2003)
- "On Anniversary of Women's Suffrage, Equality Still Elusive", Annie Laurie Gaylor (2003)
- Sisterhood Is Forever: The Women's Anthology for a New Millennium, edited by Robin Morgan (2003)
- The Female Face of God in Auschwitz: A Jewish Feminist Theology of the Holocaust, Melissa Raphael (2003)
- "The Feminist Ghost at the Conservative Political Action Conference" (2003)
- "Women's Peace Activism: Forward into the Past?", Joreen (2003)
- Not My Mother's Sister: Generational Conflict and Third-Wave Feminism, Astrid Henry (2004)
- The Pornography of Meat, Carol J. Adams (2004)
- "Women in Saudi Arabia Too Have a Dream", Mody Al-Khalaf (2004)
- Black Sexual Politics: African Americans, Gender, and the New Racism, Patricia Hill Collins (2005)
- Female Chauvinist Pigs: Women and the Rise of Raunch Culture, Ariel Levy (2005)
- Integrating Ecofeminism Globalization and World Religions, Rosemary Radford Ruether (2005)
- "Lust Horizons", Ellen Willis (2005)
- Not for Sale: Feminists Resisting Prostitution and Pornography, edited by Rebecca Whisnant and Christine Stark (2004)
- Tales from the Expat Harem: Foreign Women in Modern Turkey, edited by Anastasia M. Ashman and Jennifer Eaton Gökmen (2005)
- The Death of Feminism: What's Next in the Struggle for Women's Freedom, Phyllis Chesler (2005)
- The Mommy Myth: The Idealization of Motherhood and How It Has Undermined All Women, Susan J. Douglas with Meredith Michaels (2005)
- Women's Lives, Men's Laws, Catharine MacKinnon (2005)
- Amazon Grace: Re-Calling the Courage to Sin Big, Mary Daly (2006)
- Are Women Human?: And Other International Dialogues, Catharine MacKinnon (2006)
- Get to Work: A Manifesto for Women of the World, Linda Hirshman (2006)
- "Paradise Lost (Domestic Division)", Terry Martin Hekker (2006)
- The Dark Abode, Sarojini Sahoo (2006)
- "Understanding and Ending ECT: A Feminist Imperative", Bonnie Burstow (2006)
- Global Feminisms, Maura Reilly and Linda Nochlin (2007)
- Full Frontal Feminism: A Young Woman's Guide to Why Feminism Matters, Jessica Valenti (2007)
- Shakespeare's Wife, Germaine Greer (2007)
- Tales from the Town of Widows, James Cañón (2007)
- The Feminine Mistake: Are We Giving Up Too Much?, Leslie Bennetts (2007)
- The Feminist Care Tradition in Animal Ethics: A Reader, edited by Carol J. Adams and Josephine Donovan (2007)
- The Terror Dream, Susan Faludi (2007)
- Whipping Girl, Julia Serano (2007)
- "Women in Combat: Is the Current Policy Obsolete?" from Duke Journal of Gender Law and Policy, Martha McSally (2007)
- "Against Sexual Apartheid", Maryam Namazie (2008)
- International Journal of Feminist Approaches to Bioethics (2008–present)
- "Men Explain Things to Me", Rebecca Solnit (2008)
- Yes Means Yes, Jaclyn Friedman and Jessica Valenti (2008)
- "Women Are Never Front-Runners", Gloria Steinem (2008)
- Zealous Reformers, Deadly Laws: Battling Stereotypes, Madhu Kishwar (2008)
- Black Feminist Politics from Kennedy to Clinton, Duchess Harris (2009)
- Half the Sky: Turning Oppression into Opportunity for Women Worldwide, Nicholas Kristof and Sheryl WuDunn (2009)
- "Paycheck Feminism", Karen Kornbluh and Rachel Homer (2009)
- The Means of Reproduction: Sex, Power, and the Future of the World, Michelle Goldberg (2009)
- The Purity Myth: How America's Obsession with Virginity is Hurting Young Women, Jessica Valenti (2009)
- The Rio Declaration on Engaging Men and Boys on Achieving Gender Equality (2009)
- "The Words of God Do Not Justify Cruelty To Women", Jimmy Carter (2009)
- Broken Women of the Mountains, Nida Mahmoed (2009)

=== 2010s ===
- Big Girls Don't Cry: The Election That Changed Everything for American Women, Rebecca Traister (2010)
- Click: When We Knew We Were Feminists, edited by Courtney E. Martin and J. Courtney Sullivan (2010)
- Delusions of Gender: How Our Minds, Society, and Neurosexism Create Difference, Cordelia Fine (2010)
- Enlightened Sexism: The Seductive Message that Feminism's Work Is Done, Susan J. Douglas (2010)
- No Excuses: 9 Ways Women Can Change How We Think About Power, Gloria Feldt (2010)
- Reality Bites Back: The Troubling Truth About Guilty Pleasure TV, Jennifer L. Pozner (2010)
- Sensible Sensuality, Sarojini Sahoo (2010)
- Beauty Queens, Libba Bray (2011)
- Cinderella Ate My Daughter, Peggy Orenstein (2011)
- How to Be a Woman, Caitlin Moran (2011)
- philoSOPHIA (2011–present)
- Sister Species: Women, Animals and Social Justice, edited by Lisa A. Kemmerer (2011)
- A Marriage Agreement and Other Essays: Four Decades of Feminist Writing, Alix Kates Shulman (2012)
- Cinnamon, Samar Yazbek (2012)
- Being and Being Bought: Prostitution, Surrogacy and the Split Self, Kajsa Ekis Ekman (2014)
- "1% Feminism", Linda Burnham (2013)
- I Am Malala: The Story of the Girl Who Stood Up for Education and Was Shot by the Taliban, Malala Yousafzai and Christina Lamb (2013)
- Bad Feminist: Essays, Roxane Gay (2014)
- Men Explain Things to Me, Rebecca Solnit (2014)
- We Should All Be Feminists, Chimamanda Ngozi Adichie (2014)
- American Housewife: Stories, Helen Ellis (2015)
- Hunger Makes Me a Modern Girl, Carrie Brownstein (2015)
- Neoliberalismo Sexual: El Mito de la Libre Elección, Ana de Miguel (2015)
- Nimona, ND Stevenson (2015)
- Sisters of the Revolution: A Feminist Speculative Fiction Anthology, edited by Ann VanderMeer and Jeff VanderMeer (2015)
- Female Erasure: What You Need to Know About Gender Politics' War on Women, the Female Sex and Human Rights, edited by Ruth Barrett (2016)
- Kim Ji-young, Born 1982 by Cho Nam Joo (2016)
- Sex Object: A Memoir, Jessica Valenti (2016)
- Shrill: Notes from a Loud Woman, Lindy West (2016)
- The Geek Feminist Revolution, Kameron Hurley (2016)
- Trainwreck: The Women We Love to Hate, Mock, and Fear . . . and Why, Jude Doyle, then called Sady Doyle (2016)
- Prostitution Narratives: Stories of Survival in the Sex Trade, Caroline Norma and Melinda Tankard Reist (2016)
- Feminists Among Us: Resistance and Advocacy in Library Leadership, Shirley Lew and Baharak Yousefi (2017)
- You Play the Girl: On Playboy Bunnies, Stepford Wives, Train Wrecks, & Other Mixed Messages, Carina Chocano (2017)
- The H-Spot: The Feminist Pursuit of Happiness, Jill Filipovic (2017)
- The Feminist Reference Desk, Maria T. Accardi (2017)
- Nasty Women, edited by Samhita Mukhopadhyay and Kate Harding (2017)
- Women and Power: A Manifesto, Mary Beard (2017)
- The Big Push: Exposing and Challenging the Persistence of Patriarchy, Cynthia Enloe (2018)
- Good and Mad: The Revolutionary Power of Women's Anger, by Rebecca Traister (2018)
- The Man Who Has It All: A Patronizing Parody of Self-Help Books for Women, The Man Who Has It All (2018)
- Dead Blondes and Bad Mothers: Monstrosity, Patriarchy, and the Fear of Female Power, Jude Doyle, then called Sady Doyle (2019)
- Invisible Women: Exposing Data Bias in a World Designed for Men, Caroline Criado Perez (2019)
- New Daughters of Africa: An International Anthology of Writing by Women of African Descent, edited by Margaret Busby (2019)
- Surrogacy: A Human Rights Violation, Renate Klein (2019)
- Know My Name: A Memoir, by Chanel Miller (2019)
- What Happened to Tom, Peg Tittle (2016)
- When Women Unite: A Play about Challenges facing the Modern Movement of Feminism and Gender Dialogue, by Mahmoud Mansi (2019)

=== 2020s ===
- Hood Feminism, Mikki Kendall (2020)
- Men Who Hate Women, Laura Bates (2020)
- "This is what happens", Chris Wind (2020)
- Women Don't Owe You Pretty, Florence Given (2020)
- Desperately Seeking Shah Rukh: India's Lonely Young Women and the Search for Intimacy and Independence, Shrayana Bhattacharya (2021)
- The Hive: A Short Story About The Future, Bibiana Krall (2021)
- Women and Work: The Sky Is Full of Sexism, Rahul Kapoor (2021)
- Fighting Words: notes for a future we won't have, Peg Tittle (2022)
- Lessons in Chemistry, Bonnie Garmus (2022)
- Undead Sexist Cliches: Bad Anti-Woman Arguments Someone Should Drive a Stake Through, Fraser Sherman (2022)
- Godkiller, Hannah Kaner (2023)
- The Madonna Secret, Sophie Strand (2023)
- Abortion: Our Bodies, Their Lies, and the Truths We Use to Win, Jessica Valenti (2024)
- Feminism in the Kamala Harris Era: Sex, Violence, Anarchism, Liberals & Liberation, Sterling Harwood (2024)
- DILF: Did I Leave Feminism, Jude Doyle (2025)
- Flipping Patriarchy: Imagining a gender-swapped world, Man Who Has It All (2025)
- DEAR BIPHOBIC FEMINIST (A REBUTTAL BY A BISEXUAL FEMINIST), Lisa Plover (2026)

== See also ==
- Feminist children's literature
- Feminist science fiction
- List of American feminist literature
- List of female poets
- List of feminist comic books
- List of feminist poets
- List of women rhetoricians
- List of women writers
- Women's writing (literary category)
