= Susan Hogan =

Susan Hogan may refer to:

- Susan Hogan (actress) (born 1951), Canadian actress
- Susan Hogan (historian) (born 1961), Scottish cultural historian, academic and author
