= In the Flesh =

In the Flesh may refer to:

== Film and TV ==
- In the Flesh (1951 film), a Mexican musical drama film
- In the Flesh (1998 film), an American gay-themed murder mystery film
- In the Flesh (2003 film), an Indian documentary about prostitution in South Asia
- "In the Flesh" (Star Trek: Voyager), an episode of Star Trek: Voyager
- "In the Flesh", an episode of Xiaolin Showdown
- In the Flesh (TV series), a British supernatural drama series

== Music ==
=== Albums ===
- In the Flesh – Live, a live CD and DVD from Roger Waters' In the Flesh tours
- In the Flesh (Johnny Thunders album), a posthumous live CD by Johnny Thunders
- In the Flesh, the debut album from Nader Sadek

=== Songs ===
- "In the Flesh?"/"In the Flesh", two songs from the Pink Floyd album The Wall
- "In the Flesh" (Blondie song), a song on the album Blondie
- "In the Flesh", the second track of Pain of Salvation's album The Perfect Element, Part I

=== Tours ===
- In the Flesh (Pink Floyd tour), a 1977 tour by Pink Floyd
- In the Flesh (Roger Waters tour), a series of Roger Waters' tours from 1999 to 2002
- Utada: In the Flesh 2010, a tour by pop singer-songwriter Hikaru Utada

=== Other media ===
- In the Flesh, a 2009 collection of stories by Koren Shadmi
- Serious Sam: The First Encounter, a 2001 video game known as In the Flesh during early development
