= In the Flesh Tour =

In the Flesh Tour may refer to:

- In the Flesh (Pink Floyd tour), 1977
- In the Flesh (Roger Waters tour), 1999–2002
- Utada: In the Flesh 2010

== See also ==
- In the Flesh (disambiguation)
