= Feminist children's literature =

Writing of children's literature through a feminist lens

Feminist children's literature is the writing of children's literature through a feminist lens. Children's literature and women's literature have many similarities. Both often deal with being seen as weak and placed towards the bottom of a hierarchy. In this way feminist ideas are regularly found in the structure of children's literature. Feminist criticism of children's literature is therefore expected, since it is a type of feminist literature. Feminist children's literature has played a critical role for the feminist movement, especially in the past half century. In her book Feminism Is for Everybody: Passionate Politics, bell hooks states her belief that all types of media, including writing and children's books, need to promote feminist ideals. She argues "Children's literature is one of the most crucial sites for feminist education for critical consciousness precisely because beliefs and identities are still being formed". The cover of hooks' book, drawn by Laura DeSantis, depicts children alongside adults, showing the importance of the youth. The presence of feminism in children's literature has evolved over the years, but the overall message and goals have remained consistent.

== Background ==
=== Overview ===
During the second half of the twentieth century, children's literature and the feminist movement made many improvements together. A currently accepted method of thought for children's literature criticism in the academic world came to life during the 1970s, the same time that the second wave of feminist theory became popular. Early in the decade, feminist critics like Kate Millett explained how good writing was based on a belief that being a white male was normal and anyone else was a deviation from the normal. At this time, many female characters in children's books "play dead or doormats (as in 'Snow White', 'Cinderella', and 'Sleeping Beauty') or are severely mutilated (as in 'The Little Mermaid')". Due to the second wave of feminism, gender roles in all of the classic fairy tales (such as those by Grimm, Andersen, and Perrault) were starting to be questioned. Female heroes of the time were also inadequate. The women were simply "men tricked out in drag" and had the same exact plotlines as the male heroes. The only difference was that instead of needing to be rescued, the heroines did the rescuing. More and more studies began emerging from children's literature. All the findings agreed that women were drastically underrepresented and given few options. Boys were overwhelmingly shown to be much more active and have adventures more frequently, while girls were passive and remained in the home with the adult women. Countless studies conducted over the years all had the same or similar results.

=== Statistics and studies ===
A study conducted in 1976 by the Feminist Press examined picture books for children between the ages of four and eight published from 1972. Books were chosen if they contained the following themes: an active and adventurous girl protagonist, boys expressing multiple emotions and being sensitive, and non-traditional families that reflect multiple aspects of society. The picture books were then examined for gender stereotypes in primary and secondary characterizations, illustrations, and language. The results showed many instances of sexism. Out of a few thousand picture books published in the five-year span, fewer than 200 met the qualities needed. Although 35 publishers were represented by the books, only about six publishing houses made up the majority. Furthermore, most of the stories only had the first quality, which was a girl as an active protagonist. However, there was a problem in these stories as well. While the young main character could go out on adventures, the mother and grandmother characters were stuck in traditional roles. The study found limited examples of books that showed men as nurturing or of characters in non-traditional families. Only 143 books in the study were decided to be recommendable, 28 were somewhat recommendable, and 22 were not recommendable at all.

In 1989 a study was done in which the number of female and male characters in children's books was measured. It found that books from 1972 had female characters only 25% of the time, while in 1989 female characters were shown just as frequently as male characters. It also discovered that Caldecott winners and honor books were becoming more likely to have female characters, and that they were not given stereotyped roles as they were in the 1960s. In the late 1960s, only 1% of animal illustrations in Caldecott books were females. However, by the late 80s that number increased to 22%, and by the late 90s it was at about 72%.

Three studies done in the late 1970s and early 80s yielded interesting results about what children like to have in their books. In 1975 Sally Jennings completed a study that found that kids around the age of four remember stories where characters do reversed-stereotyped things more than they remember stories where characters act according to classic gender roles. In 1978, a study by Sally Koblinksky found that by the age of 10 children better remember stories with stereotyped characters. A study done by Jerri Kropp and Charles Halverston in 1983 showed that children in preschool dislike hearing stories in which characters of the opposite gender act along gender stereotypes more than they dislike stories that have characters that do reverse-stereotyped things.

In the early 1990s several studies were carried out that showed an increase in equality in award-winning children's literature. The research found that only 11.1% of Caldecotts during 1967 to 1971 had female protagonist. During the years 1987 to 1991, however, 43.2% had main characters that were female. By the start of the twenty-first century, reverse-stereotyped roles in the protagonist were as popular as stereotyped roles during the late 1960s.

By 1992 only 32% of Pulitzer Prizes for fiction writing, and a mere 8% of Nobel Prizes in literature, were awarded to women. However, women had won 66% of Newbery Medals. The number of female authors producing children's literature was a strong factor in these statistics.

== Goals of feminist children's literature ==
While it is important for females and males to be depicted equally in children's books, that is not the main purpose of feminist children's literature. Children's books often focus on people or animals who do not have power because they are placed at the bottom of a hierarchy. Therefore, it is the goal of feminists to promote children's literature that gives children autonomy and the authority to speak and be heard. Books for children need to show how important it is to be able to listen and hear the accounts of others' stories. Furthermore, feminist theory gives children the right to be included in the literary community, to no longer be oppressed by a hierarchical order of power. A final goal of feminists is to create non-sexist books that show what society is becoming. Promoting feminist theory without being labeled as a "message book" is crucial to the cause. By focusing on these goals, feminist authors hope to get their message across while still producing quality books for children.

== Another perspective ==
Beginning in the 1960s, feminism began to appear in many forms of media because of the social changes taking place at the time. Feminists began to use children's books to spread a better understanding of feminism and the stereotypes of women. As children are a main target of the influential stereotypes of patriarchal mass media and important receptors of literature, they can be influenced by feminist literature to help abandon any learned stereotypes. Since second-wave feminism, children's literature has been influenced by feminist theory and ideals, and is still growing as an influential media source in literature in today's society.

In Feminism is for Everybody, bell hooks expresses her enthusiasm for spreading feminist ideals to everyone to prevent stereotypes and give people new perspectives on feminism. She argues that feminism needs to be shared through many sources of media so that its ideals are easily accessible to everyone. Feminist theory can be found in children's literature. Hooks states, "There should be so many little feminist primers, easy to read pamphlets and books, telling us all about feminism, that this book would be just another passionate voice speaking out on behalf of feminist politics". Feminist children's literature provides one form of this easy-to-read media. It either acts to highlight women and educate people about their history, or it subtly shares ideas of reversed gender roles where a female character might have more power.

Children's literature can be a valuable media source to influence children's views as they learn gender stereotypes and stereotypes about women in society. Feminism began to have an increasing presence in children's literature after second-wave feminism. According to Kinga Varga-Dobai, second-wave feminist research had a huge impact on media such as children's literature. An article by Abigail Feely states, "Children's books published during and after the second-wave feminists movement provide unique clues into the gradual normalization of feminist rhetoric into broader cultural context". Varga-Dobai also states that the 1960s brought about the ideas of multicultural literature because of "shifting social and political perspectives on race, class, and gender." People began to pay more attention to the degree that children were being influenced by any ideologies embedded in children's books. Many feminists noticed that traditional folktales contained female characteristics that feminists did not agree with. Varga-Dobai says that female characters in children's novels began to be portrayed as more daring, active, and independent, in order to provide girls with a new image of an ideal female.

The idea of a strong, independent female character in children's books plays into the topic of gender representation. According to Varga-Dobai, "The study of gender portrayals in children's literature has been closely informed by both cultural and feminist studies because women, as members of culture, have often been represented as the "other" in literature". Therefore, feminists work to overcome any misrepresentations or stereotypes of gender in children's literature. Feminists want children to be educated through a feminist view so that their opinions are not as skewed when it comes to gender stereotypes and education of influential women. Also according to Varga-Dobai, "From a postconstructural feminist perspective, gender representations should allow for a more complex portrayal of subject positions available for female characters". As second-wave feminism brought social change in women's positions in society, female characters also began to take on a social change, moving away from the traditional female characters.

One example of a children's book that includes feminist ideals that highlight females is Rad American Women A-Z by Kate Shatz. Inspired by her two-year-old daughter, Schatz wanted to create a book that educates children on women's history and also teaches them the alphabet. She noticed the gap in feminist-inspired children's literature. The book features inspirational women of different races whose names start with each letter of the alphabet. It highlights influential women, or "feminist heroes," who have made important accomplishments but may not be well known. This book not only intends to fill a hole in feminist literature for children, but also to address and represent race through the women that Schatz includes. This book begins to fulfill the need of "easy to read pamphlets and books" that hooks discusses.

A prominent example of a feminist children's story that subtly speaks out about the issues of gender stereotypes is The Paper Bag Princess by Robert Munsch. It is a fairytale that has a strong female character and a feminist ending rather than a traditional story ending. The princess wears a paper bag and puts herself in danger to rescue the prince. However, the prince is ungrateful because she does not look like a real princess in her paper bag. Like many children's books, this story shows reversed roles of male and female characters, which reveals that feminist ideals are seeping into children's literature. Both the book itself and the history of its publication and of subsequent study of it by feminist writers give valuable insight into the course of second-wave feminism.

Children's literature can have a significant impact in the classroom. As children learn about issues of culture, feminist lenses are encouraging students to take on different perspectives. Learning through a feminist lens also encourages different views not only about gender representations, but also about race and class. It is believed that feminist theory can transform students' readings by how much they recognize the different gender patterns throughout literature. An article by Feely suggests, "Many radical and incorrect images of feminism persist in the popular imagination. At the same time, ironically, feminism has become so ingrained into mainstream culture that many students don't recognize it". Feminism is sometimes skewed in the popular media, but it is also subtly fixed into culture through children's literature. As students learn, they are heavily influenced by mainstream culture, but incorporating children's literature into classroom settings can help expand opinions.

Feminist children's books are becoming more prevalent, but we are still in need of more female children's authors and books, according to hooks. In hooks' opinion, "We are not there yet. But this is what we must do to share feminism, to let the movement into everybody's mind and heart". She believes that there is still much to be done to spread the correct image of feminism, whether it is done through children's literature or through mainstream media sources. Feminism has become more prevalent in children's books since second-wave feminism, but there is still a gap in children's feminist literature that can continue to be filled.

== Ethics ==
Historically children's books were written to entertain and educate children. However, new readings of children's books reveal unethical concepts towards racism, gender and colonialism. New gender and feminist studies endeavour to right these wrongs. The goal is to unlearn previous negative attitudes of race and gender. Children's learning is to be moulded in diversity and inclusivity is a moral principle and mutual obligation by parents, educators and the community. The ethics in children's books guide the young reader to form basic concepts and fundamental principles of decent human conduct and essential equality. Ethics help children to shape the way they live, what they do, and how they make choices and values in their world. Since the mid -50s it has become vogue to reread and reinterpret classic children's books. As to what children's books should accomplish trouble cultural observers. However, they agree that the narratives in children's books must delete unequal social arrangements: and instead of identifying inequality, describe, challenge, and subvert systems of inequality.

== Generalizations ==
Gender stereotypes found in innocent characters in fairy tales and racism and sexism found in the simplistic adventures of Thomas the Tank Engine do not give children positive role models.

The message in the Little Red Hen, teamwork and hard work, is overlooked and its main character has become a racist capitalist who refused to feed the poor.

Peter Pan saves Tiger Lilly, and his heroic gesture is indicative of her as uneducated and savage because she is a female.

A picture book Rosie's Walk, written by Pat Hutchinson, about a hen who is unaware that a fox is hunting her in the farmyard is seen as a symbol of 'stupid womanhood.' However, critics overlook the humours musings of Rosie's walk around the farmyard.

Critics in America suggest a rewriting of Cinderella in a 'less sexist vein.' Cinderella is too pretty; she has dishpan hands and flat feet because she does too much housework and Cinderella dances with too many men in one night.

The Famous Five, critics accuse Enid Blyton's depiction of boys and girls as sexist. It is not enough for Georgina to be a leader if she looks like a girl. The character has to take on the persona of a boy by having short hair and demanding to be called George.

The independent, self-assertive, supergirl, Pippi Longstocking is but a boy in disguise.

These generalizations are counter-productive and divert from the more overtly severe cases, such as Little Black Sambo (1899). However, the author, Helen Bannerman had no obnoxious intentions; by default, she did not have a talent for drawing. Polar, written by Elaine Moss, about a polar bear, was rejected by an American publisher because the bear is 'explicitly white.'

In an attempt to avoid stereotypes, girls are shown as strong, brave and resourceful, mothers go out to work, boys knit, and fathers cook cakes. Authors write, and editors publish in fear in absurd efforts to avoid giving offence. Another implication of these attitudes is a reverse gender stratification: girls cannot wear pink as it sets a gender norm of the feminine and boys must not wear blue as it sets a gender norm of masculine traits. However, because the unrealistic generalizations of gender representation in the debate on rewriting classic books, stripping them of all negative gender, sexism and racial bias continues. Sarah Begley, Time (2017), advises parents to read with their children, 'children are going to encounter it, and a safer way to learn how to counter it is via fiction. If you are reading a sexist/racist children's book with a child, you can help them read it critically.' Another critic, Malcolm Jones, cites from the National Coalition Against Censorship, PEN American Center, and the First Amendment Committee of American Society of Journalists and Authors who argued 'while it is perfectly valid for critics to dispute a book's historical accuracy and literary merits, the appropriate response is not to withdraw the volume and deprive readers of a chance to evaluate the book and the controversy for themselves.'

Amy Singer suggests children are deprived of great literature, exciting stories, mystery, and adventure in the rewriting of classical children's books. Furthermore, these books are useful as historical evidence of how and what shaped people's attitude in the time they were written and supply a source of debate of right and wrong and how we acknowledge that there is a better way to live. Moreover, studies by sociologists focus on the behaviour of boys and girls in books as an ideological reality of individual ability and character. In Novel Readings (1990) Marjorie DeVault suggests, 'readers of a single novel create an individual understanding of that novel, alongside the meanings that the novel's creator might have intended.'

However, Amy Singer, claims that 'a subversive story for children will include not only strong role models at an individual level but also connections between social power and inequality.' The questions Singer asks are how connected are the narratives of the protagonists to the social structures in which they live and do they implicate a subversive representation of the cultural stratification. The questionnaire that Singer developed in her analysis of children's books takes into consideration the:

Book publication date, publisher, author and the elements of narrative texts. What is the books setting, who is the primary character, is there an implied reader and what is her/his implied body of knowledge?

Moreover, Ewick and Silbey suggest that children's narratives can 'support challenges to the status quo by illuminating a set of tactics for future use.' Children's narratives can inspire change and can provide the exposure of power as a means to reverse that power. When children read books, they look for role models with leadership qualities. Due to the lack of female representation, girls are being denied positive role models to emulate. In order to dispel the belief there is only one way to identify as male or female in children's books, a variety of characters, personality traits and behaviours are paramount in the writing of children's books.

More important, children's narratives can teach children how social arrangements are gendered and how they may determine their fates. The role model that characters play out and their narratives can draw attention to social relationships and teach young readers to think critically about what they read. Furthermore, to expose young readers to social systems and inequality will teach them how the world is organised and how they might be negotiated or challenged.
