= Winona Branch Sawyer =

American writer

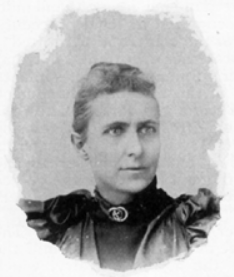
- Born: August 8, 1847; Williamsville, New York, US
- Died: October 24, 1939 (aged 92); Lancaster County, Nebraska, US
- Known for: Feminist literature

Winona Branch Sawyer (August 8, 1847 – October 24, 1939) was an American writer. She spoke widely about feminism. She also studied law and became the second woman to be admitted to the Nebraska bar in 1887. In 1889, she was admitted to the Supreme Court.

== Early and personal life ==
Sawyer was born on August 8, 1847, in Williamsville, New York to Rev. Wm. Branch and Elizabeth Trowbridge Branch. Her mother died when she was three years old, and since then she had travelled frequently with his father who was a Baptist missionary. His father initiated the establishment of many churches in New York, Wisconsin, Illinois, Indiana and Pennsylvania.

Sawyer was a close, lifelong friend of former colleague Frances Shimer. In 1875, she married lawyer A.J Sawyer and moved to Nebraska.

== Education and career ==
Sawyer attended Mount Carroll Seminary, which is now known as Shimer College, and graduated in 1871. She worked as a teacher at the institution and later became a member of the board of trustees. She donated the Sawyer House, which became the official residence of the campus president.

In 1883, she enrolled at the University of Nebraska to study painting and art history.

She later studied law and became the second woman to be admitted to the Nebraska bar in 1887. In 1889, she was admitted to the Supreme Court. Sawyer adopted and looked after two male siblings and was therefore unable to practice law. Nevertheless, she regularly assisted her husband in the preparation of his cases. Sawyer once commented about the status of women in the legal profession at the time:

The legal profession perhaps has been the most reluctant to open its portals to admit in fellowship of the former pariahs of legal procedure. Merit has not sex. The meritorious lawyer, man or woman, who deserves success, who can both work and wait to win, is sure to achieve both recognition and award.

— Winona Branch Sawyer

Sawyer wrote many literary works throughout her life — ranging from newspaper correspondences, addresses, speeches, essays and fictions.

== Works ==
- The Legal Profession for Women (1893)
- Is Farming a Realized Alchemy? (1893)
- What Becomes of the Girl Graduates (1895)
- The New Woman (1895)
- Gingerbread (1902)
- Parkour House Rolls (1901)
- Mrs. Shimer's Life and Work (1901)
- Lewis and Clark: The Story of their Expedition (1923)

== Death ==
Sawyer died on October 24, 1939, at Lincoln, Lancaster County, Nebraska. She was buried at Wyuka Cemetery.
