= Genevieve Lloyd =

Australian philosopher and feminist

Genevieve Mary Lloyd FAHA (born 16 October 1941 at Cootamundra, New South Wales), is an Australian philosopher and feminist.

== Biography ==
Lloyd studied philosophy at the University of Sydney in the early 1960s and then at Somerville College, Oxford. Her D.Phil, awarded in 1973, was on "Time and Tense". From 1967 until 1987 she lectured at the Australian National University, during which period she developed her most influential ideas and wrote The Man of Reason, which was published in 1984. In 1987 she was appointed to the chair of philosophy at the University of New South Wales, being the first female professor of philosophy appointed in Australia. She was elected a Fellow of the Australian Academy of the Humanities in 1995. On retirement, she was appointed Professor Emerita.

== Philosophical work ==
Lloyd's 1979 paper The Man of Reason explores the influence of seventeenth century rationalist philosophy on contemporary views of gender and reason. It argues that Cartesian method encouraged a new polarisation between reason, on the one side, and emotion and imagination on the other. The Man of Reason was further elevated to an ethical (not merely epistemic) ideal in Spinoza's Ethics. Even though Descartes and Spinoza's rationalism is less popular today, Lloyd argues that we continue to live with the ideal of the Man of Reason their work gave rise to. She went on to develop these ideas further in her 1984 book of the same name.

== Bibliography ==
=== Books ===
- Lloyd, Genevieve (1986) [1984]. The man of reason: "male" and "female" in Western philosophy. Methuen & Co Ltd. ISBN 0-416-34920-X.
- Lloyd, Genevieve (1993). The man of reason: "male" and "female" in Western philosophy (second ed.). Routledge. ISBN 0-415-09681-2.
- Lloyd, Genevieve (1993). Being in time: selves and narrators in philosophy and literature. Routledge. ISBN 9780415071963.
- Lloyd, Genevieve (1994). Part of nature: self-knowledge in Spinoza's Ethics. Cornell University Press. ISBN 9780801429996.
- Lloyd, Genevieve (1996). Routledge philosophy guidebook to Spinoza and the ethics. Routledge. ISBN 9780415107822.
- Lloyd, Genevieve; Gatens, Moira (1999). Collective imaginings: Spinoza, past and present. Routledge. ISBN 9780415165716.
- Lloyd, Genevieve (2001). Spinoza: critical assessments. Routledge. ISBN 9780415186223.
- Lloyd, Genevieve (2002). Feminism and history of philosophy. OUP. ISBN 9780199243747.
- Lloyd, Genevieve (2008). Providence lost. Harvard University Press. ISBN 9780674031531.
- Lloyd, Genevieve (2013). Enlightenment Shadows. Oxford University Press. ISBN 9780199669561.
- Lloyd, Genevieve (2018). Reclaiming Wonder: After the Sublime. Edinburgh University Press. ISBN 9781474433112.

=== Chapters in books ===
- Lloyd, Genevieve (2005), "The man of reason", in Cudd, Ann E.; Andreasen, Robin O. (eds.), Feminist theory: a philosophical anthology, Oxford, UK Malden, Massachusetts: Blackwell Publishing, pp. 177–187, ISBN 9781405116619.
