= Stolen Sunshine =

2002 novel by Smita Jhavar

- Author: Smita Jhavar
- Publisher: New Age Books
- Publication date: 2002
- Pages: 153 pp.
- ISBN: 9788178220802
- OCLC: 212831322

Stolen Sunshine: A Woman's Quest for Herself is a 2002 novel by Smita Jhavar. The book is mainly about the complex social lives of Marwari women living in India. The plot concerns the three generations of a family - an elderly lady called Kesar Maa, her daughter Radha and granddaughters Krishna and Rukmini, and the other near and dear ones these people have. After untimely death of Rukmini's husband she has to take the family business in her hands and thus breaking away from tradition (men only rule) gives birth to many go-throughs. The storyline passes through pre-Independence and post-Independence period, and gives importance to the huge effect of historical upheavals to the position of women in Indian society.

The author is the Director of Bharatiya Vidya Bhavan's Public School in Gwalior.
