= And Who Will Make the Chapatis? =

1998 book by Bishakha Datta

- 2001 cover
- Editor: Bishakha Datta
- Author: Bishakha Datta, et al
- Language: English
- Subject: Women in politics — India
- Genre: Non-fiction
- Publisher: Stree Publications
- Publication date: 1998
- Publication place: United States
- Media type: Print (Hardcover and Paperback)
- Pages: 141
- ISBN: 81-85604-24-X

And Who Will Make the Chapatis? is an overview of the all-women political panchayats formed in Maharashtra, India, where policy changes in the latter half of the 20th century explicitly created space for women in local, rural government, and gave their governing bodies funds and a mandate to oversee certain local works. The book, first published in 1998, includes reports from the field by Meenakshi Shedde, Sonali Sathaye, Sharmila Joshi, and Bishakha Datta, and was edited by Datta. A second print run was produced in 2001. The book is regularly cited as a detailed look at women's participation in rural Indian politics.

Though politics continues to be dominated by men, the case studies identified for the book clearly bring forward positive trends of participation of women in Indian politics.

== Contents ==
The book consists of individual interviews with women who were members of 12 panchayats in 9 villages, introductions to their circumstances (each panchayat started in a different era; most are no longer active), and analysis of the implications for the involvement of women in politics and the difference this made on local governance and life. The panchayats surveyed include the oldest one on record (in Nimbut village in Pune from 1963 to 1968, before legislation guaranteed authority and seats for women to panchayats across the region) to current panchayats in Brahmanghar and Bhende Khurd that were active at the time of publication.

== Awards ==
- Hochstadt Award (2008)
