= The Man of Reason =

1984 book by Genevieve Lloyd

- Cover of the first edition
- Author: Genevieve Lloyd
- Language: English
- Subject: Western philosophy
- Publisher: Methuen
- Publication date: 1984
- Publication place: United Kingdom
- Media type: Print (Hardcover and Paperback)
- Pages: 138 (original edition)
- ISBN: 978-0415096812

The Man of Reason: "Male" and "Female" in Western Philosophy (1984; second edition 1993) is a book about the association between maleness and reason in western philosophy by the Australian philosopher Genevieve Lloyd. The work received positive reviews. It has been called a twentieth century classic of feminist thought, and is widely read in the Nordic countries.

== Summary ==
Lloyd discusses the relationship between gender and ideals of rationality, and the related issues of relativism and cultural relativism, and addresses the "maleness" of "character ideals centred on the idea of Reason", which in her view has implications for how gender difference is understood. She discusses philosophers such as Plato, Aristotle, René Descartes, Georg Wilhelm Friedrich Hegel, Friedrich Nietzsche, Jean-Paul Sartre, and Simone de Beauvoir, beginning with a discussion of her The Second Sex (1949).

Lloyd contends that rationality, when conceptualized as a moral or character trait rather than merely a cognitive faculty, has historically been constructed in contrast to qualities ascribed to women. This gendered dichotomy—reason as male, emotion or irrationality as female—is shown to permeate philosophical traditions, even in instances where philosophers did not explicitly intend to make gendered distinctions. The book situates itself within broader feminist critiques of seemingly neutral intellectual traditions, paralleling the work of scholars such as Carol Gilligan, Evelyn Fox Keller, and Susan Moller Okin. While some feminist thinkers have explored gender biases in science or moral theory, Lloyd focuses specifically on the philosophical construction of reason itself. She avoids potential charges of self-refutation by framing her critique not as a rejection of reason, but as an analysis of how reason has been historically defined in gendered terms.

== Publication history ==
The Man of Reason was first published by Methuen in 1984. It was reprinted in 1986. A second edition was published in 1993, and reprinted in 1995.

== Reception ==
The Man of Reason received positive reviews from Naomi Scheman in The Women's Review of Books and K. Russell in Choice. The book received a mixed review from Astrid M. O'Brien in Library Journal. The book was also reviewed by the philosopher Virginia Held in Ethics, the philosopher Mary Tiles in Philosophy, Kathryn Jackson in Signs, Ruby Riemer in Women & Politics, Sara Shute in Journal of the History of Philosophy, and Marjean D. Purinton in Southern Humanities Review, and discussed by Martina Reuter and Laura Werner in NORA: Nordic Journal of Women's Studies.

Scheman described the book as "brilliantly concise". She credited Lloyd with being "admirably sensitive to the historical changes in the characterization of reason", and argued that while most academic philosophers believe that "the current competing pictures of the normatively rational self are in theory gender-neutral", Lloyd made a strong case to the contrary in her "utterly devastating" book. She considered it "paradoxically rooted in the very norms of rational discourse whose nature, function, and origin" Lloyd questioned and predicted that many academic philosophers would not be convinced by Lloyd's arguments. She wrote that Lloyd's attempt to show that "discourses based on inegalitarian projects and interests are unable to live up to their own norms" is a strategy largely inspired by the work of Karl Marx, a philosopher not discussed by Lloyd. She endorsed Lloyd's view that Beauvoir's attempt to put Sartre's and Hegel's "notions of transcendence" to feminist use is problematic, since transcendence is in its origins transcendence of the feminine.

Russell called the book "an extensive, careful historical analysis of the claim that Western standards of rationality and morality are masculine in orientation". O'Brien wrote that the book was "well researched" but also "wordy, repetitious, and tedious to read."

Reuter and Werner wrote that the book "has prompted new ways of reading the history of philosophy and has become a feminist classic widely read in the Nordic countries."

S. A. Grave wrote that The Man of Reason has been considered a twentieth century classic of feminist thought. Lloyd, who has described the book as an "overview of the successive alignments between maleness and ideals of reason throughout the history of western philosophy", has argued that the work had sometimes been misunderstood and that it had been criticized for failing to distinguish between true philosophical thought and "sexist metaphor". She acknowledged that her views had changed since its publication.

== See also ==
- Feminist theory
