= In the Flesh (2003 film) =

- Directed by: Bishakha Datta
- Written by: Bishakha Datta
- Starring: Shabana, Bhaskar, Uma
- Cinematography: Ranu Ghosh
- Production company: Point of View
- Release date: 2003
- Running time: 53 minutes
- Country: India
- Language: English

In the Flesh: three lives in prostitution is a 2003 independent documentary by Bishakha Datta about the lives of three Indian sex workers, written for a family audience. It is a low-budget film set in Calcutta and Mumbai that describes the everyday life of its subjects.

It was filmed in 2000, and released in India in 2002, before an international release in 2003. The subjects of the documentary were chosen with help from the Durbar Mahila Samanwaya Committee (a Calcutta sex worker collective) and at Calcutta's Sex Workers Mela, an annual event held in the city's Salt Lake Stadium that attracts over 10,000 people a day.

== Plot ==
In The Flesh follows three sex workers: Shabana (who works the highways near Mumbai), Bhaskar (a hijra who sells sex to men in Calcutta), and Uma (a former theater actress who lives in a Calcutta brothel). The film follows their daily routines, from picking up customers and sex to their private social lives to violence and activism.

== History and reception ==
The idea for the film came about while Datta and Point of View were researching a report for the grassroots organization Sangram about its work with sex workers over the previous 10 years.

After its Indian release in 2002, it was screened internationally in 2003:

- Global Visions Film and Video Festival, Canada 2003
- Three Continents Human Rights Film Festival, Cape Town, South Africa 2003
- South Asia Human Rights Film and Video Festival, New York 2003
- International Video Festival, Trivandrum 2003
