= Bishakha Datta =

Indian film director

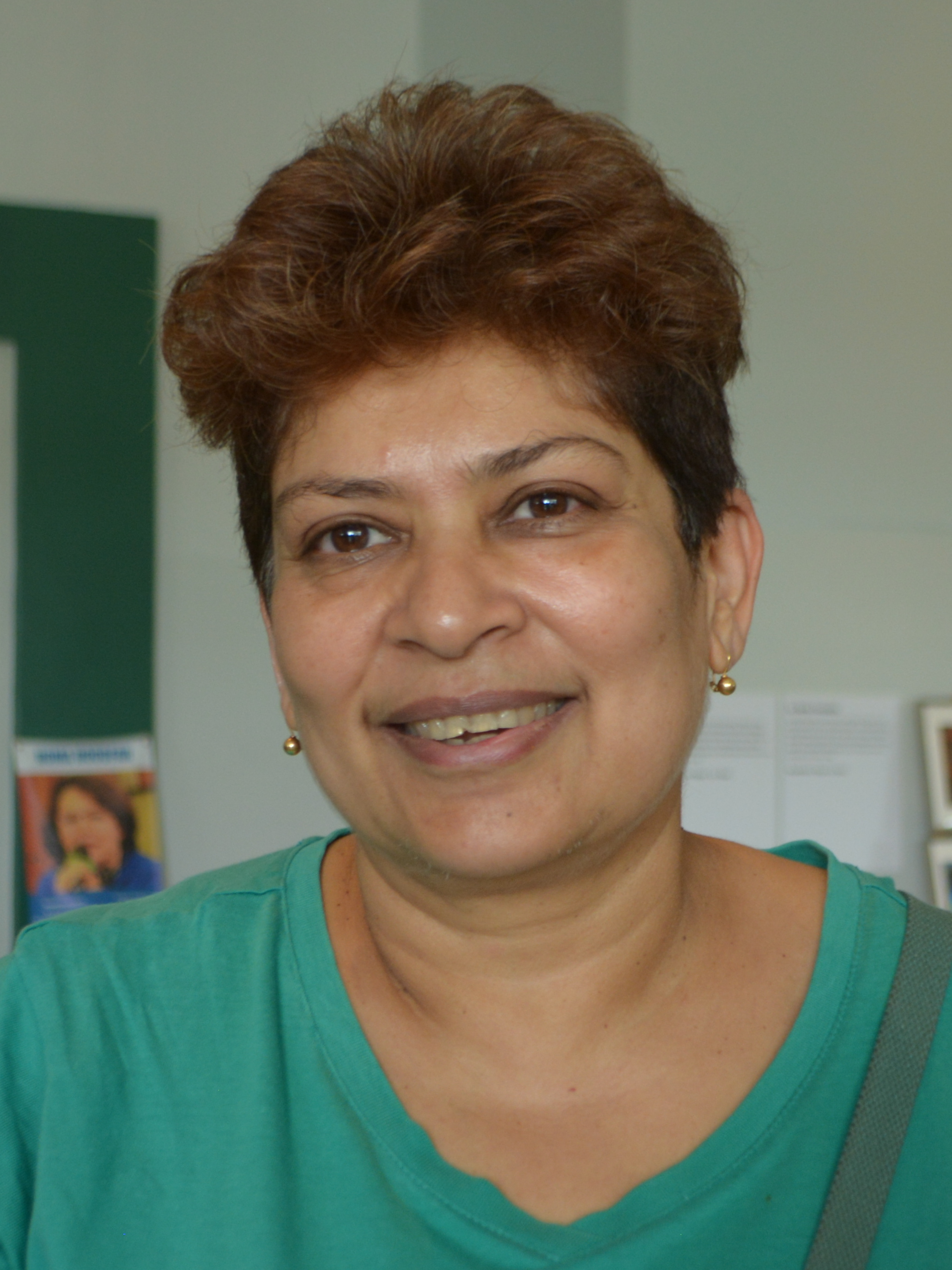
- Bishakha Datta at AWID 2016
- Occupations: Journalist, Filmmaker

Bishakha Datta is an Indian film maker, activist and a former journalist. She is the co-founder and executive director of Point of View, based in Mumbai, a non-profit working in the area of gender, sexuality and women's rights. She also serves on the board of nonprofit organizations including Creating Resources for Empowerment in Action and the Wikimedia Foundation (2010–2014), where she was the first Indian to serve on the board of trustees.

== Life and works ==
In 1998, Datta edited And Who Will Make the Chapatis?, an overview of the all-women political panchayats formed in Maharashtra, India. In 2003, her documentary In the Flesh: three lives in prostitution was released.
