= In the Flesh (Johnny Thunders album) =

Live album by Johnny Thunders
- Released: May 9, 2000
- Recorded: January 4, 1987
- Venue: The Roxy Theatre, West Hollywood, Los Angeles
- Genre: Punk rock
- Length: 71:47
- Label: Amsterdamned/Triple X

Johnny Thunders chronology
Vive la Revolution! (1999)	In the Flesh (2000)	L.A.M.F. Outtakes (Johnny Thunders & The Heartbreakers) (2000)

Professional ratings
Review scores
Source	Rating
Allmusic	4/5 stars

In the Flesh is a posthumous live CD by punk rock guitarist/singer/songwriter Johnny Thunders. It consists of the full live set featuring a reunion of Thunders with fellow ex-New York Dolls and Heartbreakers drummer Jerry Nolan, ex-Dolls bassist Arthur "Killer" Kane, and ex-Idols & London Cowboys guitarist Barry Jones, recorded at the Roxy Theatre in Los Angeles, California on January 4, 1987. Given Thunders' notoriety for performing in a smacked-out or alcoholic haze, this more sober and professional Thunders performance led one reviewer to declare the CD to contain "an ample track selection, generally superb performances, and surprisingly good fidelity all in one package -- a Triple Crown rarely achieved in the world of J.T. live recordings."

It would be the last time Kane would ever play with Thunders and Nolan, as the two musicians would die within a year of each other (Kane died of leukemia a month after playing a formal New York Dolls show with surviving members David Johansen and Sylvain Sylvain). The show was also filmed with a single VHS video camera and would become a popular bootleg amongst Thunders' fans; the footage was officially released, with the consent of Thunders' and Kane's estates, in November 2004 as the DVD Thunders, Nolan and Kane: You Can't Put Your Arms Around A Memory.

This recording was concurrently released by Munster Records in Spain as Panic on Sunset Strip. Later, it was released legitimately by Shakedown/Secret/MVD as part of the box set Eve of Destruction.

== Track listing ==
All tracks composed by Johnny Thunders; except where indicated

1. "Pipeline" (Spickard, Carmen)
2. "Blame It On Mom"
3. "Personality Crisis" (Johnny Thunders, David Johansen)
4. "I Can Tell" (Ellas McDaniel, Smith)
5. "Dead Or Alive"
6. "Can't Keep My Eyes On You" (Walter Lure, Jerry Nolan)
7. "I Ain't Superstitious" (Willie Dixon)
8. Medley: "Too Much Junkie Business/Pills" (Walter Lure) / (Ellas McDaniel)
  - "Pills" is not listed on the album
9. "You Can't Put Your Arms Around a Memory"
10. "Eve of Destruction" (P.F. Sloan)
11. "It's Not Enough"
12. "Lonely Planet Boy" (David Johansen)
13. "The Wizard" (Marc Bolan)
14. "Play with Fire" (Mick Jagger, Keith Richards)
15. "Green Onions" (Jones, Cropper, Steinburg, Jackson)
16. "In the Midnight Hour" (Wilson Pickett, Steve Cropper)
17. "Sad Vacation"
18. "Little Queenie" (Chuck Berry)
19. "Born To Lose"

== Personnel ==
- Johnny Thunders - guitar, vocals
- Barry Jones - guitar
- Arthur Kane - bass
- Jerry Nolan - drums
