= Anne B. Poyntz =

English writer

Anne B. Poyntz was an eighteenth-century English writer, thought to have been born between 1701 and 1750. She is author of Je ne sçai quoi: or, A collection of letters, odes, &c., Never before published. By a Lady [Anne B. Poyntz], published in 1769.

== Je ne sçai quoi: or, A collection of letters, odes, &c., Never before published. By a Lady ==
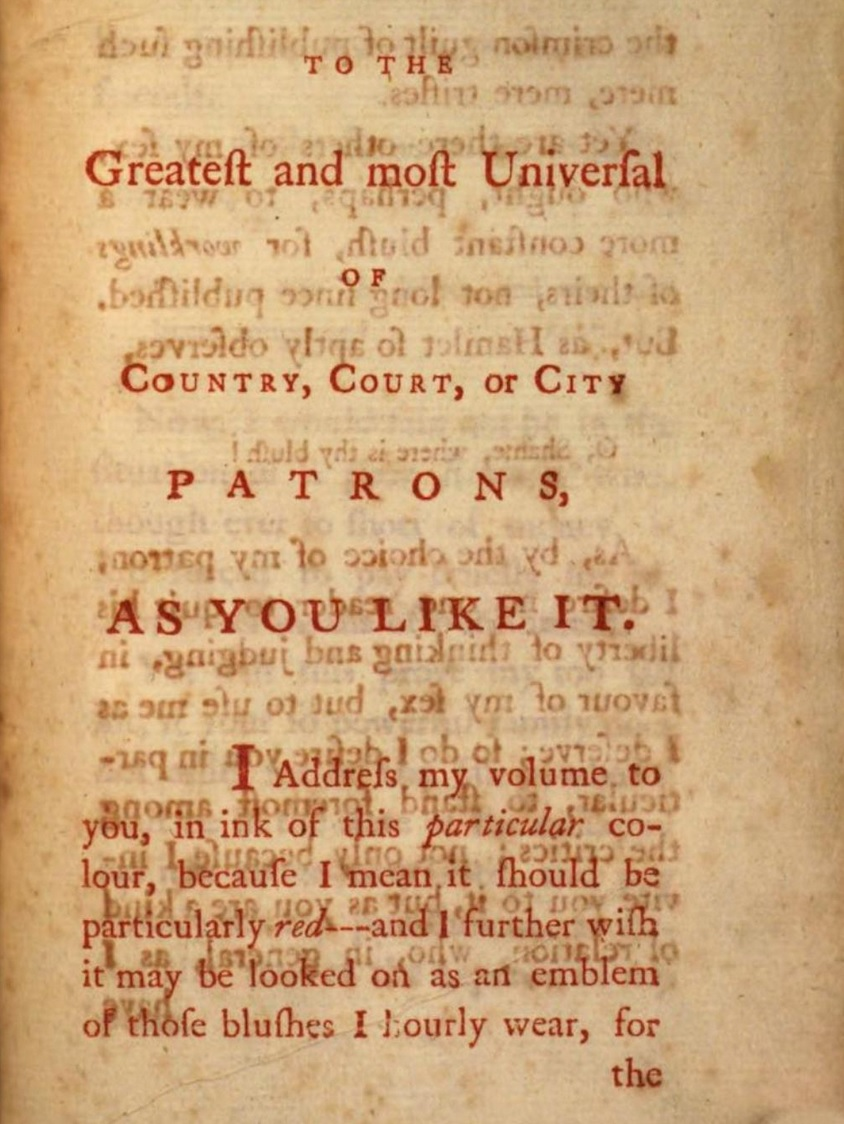
Dedication page (1 of 4) of Je ne sçai quoi showing the red ink.

The introduction is printed in red ink and ends with "Parnassus Valley, April 1, 1768." The decision to use red ink in the printing is addressed in the text, that she wanted it to be "particularly red", which is a play on words explored by Dr. Kristyn Leuner in her article on the digitization of the work.

Poyntz stated that she told the publisher to list the work as being by "a woman", not "a lady". The work is viewed as feminist writing, with references to pretending to be subordinate to men and a "love of love".

Poyntz's name is spelled without the "e", as Ann B. Poyntz, in A Catalogue of Rare Curious and Valuable Old Books on Sale from 1882.

Je ne sçai quoi was reviewed by one male contemporary as being too risqué, with one of his complaints being that the quotations used by Poyntz "are by no means suitable to the idea of familiar letters."

== Other attributions ==
She is also one of the authors listed for the 1768 publication of A Word to the Wise: A Poetical Farce, Most Respectfully Addressed to the Critical Reviewers. By T. Underwood, ... With an Apology to the Ingenuity of Mr. Hugh Kelly, for the Title of the Piece, Volume 1. The book was also published in 1770 solely under Thomas Underwood.

She is also listed as being of Irish nationality in a 1912 catalog of Irish poets.
