= Susan Hogan (historian) =

British cultural historian (born 1961)

Susan Hogan (born 1961) is a British cultural historian. Hogan is Professor in Cultural Studies & Art Therapy at the University of Derby.

== Personal life ==
Hogan married Philip Douglas in 1988, and then divorced in 1998. Hogan's mother-in-law was noted anthropologist Dame Mary Douglas. She has two children: Emile and Eilish.

== Career ==
Hogan attended a school based on the doctrine of A.S. Neill’s Summerhill School. This experience, coupled with the anthropological work of her mother-in-law, influenced her work.

She started her Ph.D. at the University of Sydney in art history and finished it in cultural history at the Thomas Reid Institute of the University of Aberdeen, where G.S. Rousseau served as her primary supervisor.

She has taught in a number of universities including the University of New South Wales and University of Derby where she is a Research Professor in Arts & Health.

Hogan's work has focused on the history of madness, especially looking at constructions of madness in relation to women. Her published work is significant in its sustained challenge to the use of reductive psychology and for bringing anthropological and sociological ideas to bear on the subject of art therapy. The field of arts in health as a whole was under-theorised, but British art therapy practice in the 1990s was becoming increasingly dominated by a dogmatic application of psychoanalytic theory and also a reductive application of object-relations theory, both of which are critiqued in her important essay 'Problems of Identity' (1997). Dominant conceptual frameworks tended to see the locus of illness as situated firmly within the psychopathology of the individual, though the way that this is understood is different in psychoanalytic and analytic (Jungian) theories. In psychoanalytic theory the aetiology of pathology is the result of repressed instinctual material, particularly from childhood. The psychoanalytic theory of symbolism has particular implications for how images are understood within art therapy. The psychoanalytic theory of symbolism was the predominant theoretical framework in the period, having gained ground over the hitherto significant Jungian model, which had been very influential in the UK in the post-war period, as explored in Hogan's historical monograph 'Healing Arts' (Hogan 2001). The essay 'Problems of Identity' allowed a paradigm shift to take place by offering cultural, rather than purely psychological explanations for states of being, with respect to women’s experience of mental illness in particular. It drew on art theory, cultural theory and feminist critiques of science. As a consequence of Hogan's early work a literature using cultural approaches has grown subsequently within the arts and health.

One strand of her work has explored arts and health with women who have recently given birth, offering art therapy groups to give support to woman and an opportunity for them to explore their changed sense of self-identity and sexuality as a result of pregnancy and motherhood. The way that motherhood is contested and conceptualised is complex and potentially destabilising for women’s mental health, so it is a subject that has continued to preoccupy Hogan in a series of essays and book chapters as well edited volumes.

She has also written on the subject of women who kill infants (looking at how women's mental states were used in court defences), and on women in older age, especially on representations of ageing. Her recent work on photography consolidates her various interests in visual culture, looking at the subject of photography with respect to wellbeing and therapeutic applications. Images of gender part determine what it is possible to conceptualise, as part of the dispositive apparatus, (Foucault’s idea of the way we are constituted via institutions, institutional practices and discourses) so giving research subjects, or those in therapy, opportunities to think about themselves in relation to represented social processes is important and enriching for art therapy practice. Hogan has argued for over twenty years that it is essential not to view women with mental distress in reductive ways that further compound our suffering and which help to consolidate social processes that are fundamentally toxic and illness inducing.

Another strand of Hogan's work and creative contribution has been in the application of art therapy techniques to social-science methods and this has resulted in several publications on visual methods in which Hogan combines her interest in gender and inequality with methodological innovation. An example is the essay 'Working Across Disciplines: Using Visual Methods in Participatory Frameworks' (2016). The use of art therapy techniques within the field of social science visual methods is unknown prior Hogan's input in 2010 with the visual anthropologist, Professor Pink.

== Books ==
- Feminist Approaches to Art Therapy (as editor, 1997);
- Healing Arts: The History of Art Therapy (2001);
- Gender Issues in Art Therapy (as editor, 2003);
- Conception Diary: Thinking About Pregnancy & Motherhood (2006);
- Revisiting Feminist Approaches to Art Therapy (as editor, 2012);
- The Introductory Guide to Art Therapy (with Annette M. Coulter, 2014);
- Art Therapy Theories. A Critical Introduction (2016);
- Inscribed on the Body. Gender and Difference in the Arts Therapies (2019);
- Gender Issues in International Arts Therapies Research (commissioned by the European Consortium of Art Therapy Educators – ECArTE) (2020);
- The Maternal Tug: Ambivalence, Identity, and Agency(with La-Chance Adams and Cassidy, 2020);
- Therapeutic Arts in Pregnancy, Birth & New Motherhood (2020);
- Photography. Arts for Health Series (2022).
