= Feminist literature =

Literary genre supporting feminist goals

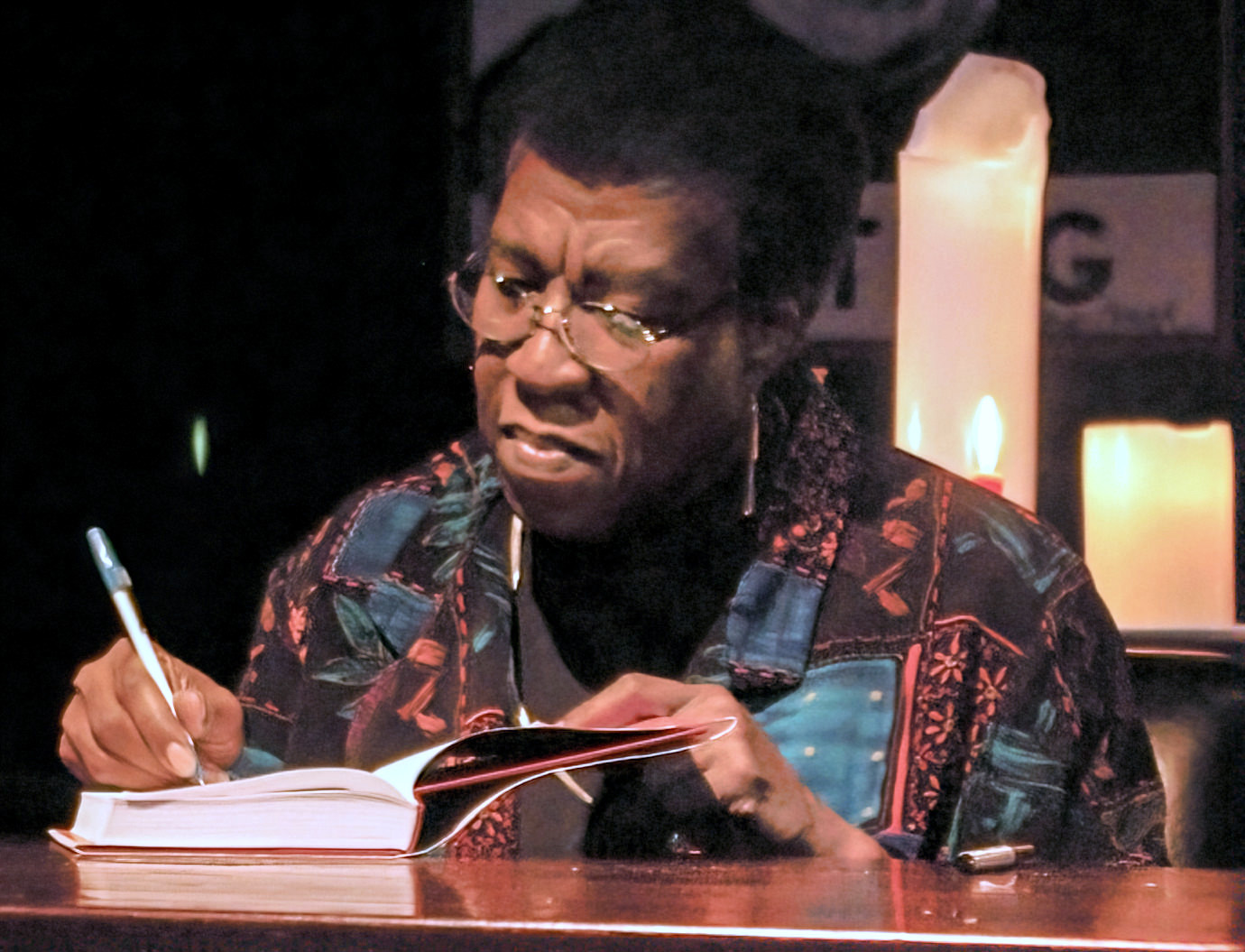
Octavia Butler, award-winning feminist science fiction author

Feminist literature is fiction, nonfiction, drama, or poetry, which supports the feminist goals of defining, establishing, and defending equal civil, political, economic, and social rights for women. It often addresses the roles of women in society particularly as regarding status, privilege, and power – and generally portrays the consequences to women, men, families, communities, and societies as undesirable.

== History ==
In the 15th century, Christine de Pizan wrote The Book of the City of Ladies which combats prejudices and enhances the importance of women in society. The book follows the model of De Mulieribus Claris, written in the 14th century by Giovanni Boccaccio.

The feminist movement produced feminist fiction, feminist non-fiction, and feminist poetry, which created new interest in women's writing. It also prompted a general reevaluation of women's historical and academic contributions in response to the belief that women's lives and contributions have been underrepresented as areas of scholarly interest. There has also been a close link between feminist literature and activism, with feminist writing typically voicing key concerns or ideas of feminism in a particular era.

Much of the early feminist literary scholarship was given over to the rediscovery and reclamation of texts written by women. In Western feminist literary scholarship, studies such as Dale Spender's Mothers of the Novel (1986) and Jane Spencer's The Rise of the Woman Novelist (1986) were ground-breaking in their insistence that women have always been writing.

Corresponding with this growth in scholarly interest, various presses began the task of reissuing long-out-of-print texts. Virago Press began to publish its large list of 19th and early-20th-century novels in 1975 and became one of the first commercial presses to join in the project of reclamation. In the 1980s, Pandora Press, responsible for publishing Spender's study, issued a companion line of 18th-century novels written by women. More recently, Broadview Press continues to issue 18th- and 19th-century novels, many hitherto out of print, and the University of Kentucky has a series of republications of early women's novels.

Particular works of literature have come to be known as key feminist texts. In the 17th century, Aphra Behn, the first woman in England to make her living as a writer, integrated sharp critiques of women's lack of marital and property in her plays and poems. A Vindication of the Rights of Woman (1792) by Mary Wollstonecraft, is one of the earliest works of feminist philosophy. Pandita Ramabai Sarasvati took on patriarchy and the caste system in The High Caste Hindu Women (1887) — what has been called India's "feminist manifesto". A Room of One's Own (1929) by Virginia Woolf, is noted in its argument for both a literal and figural space for women writers within a literary tradition dominated by patriarchy. Germaine Greer's The Female Eunuch (1970) questions the self-limiting role of the woman homemaker.

The widespread interest in women's writing is related to a general reassessment and expansion of the literary canon. Interest in post-colonial literature, gay and lesbian literature, writing by people of color, working people's writing, and the cultural productions of other historically marginalized groups have resulted in a whole scale expansion of what is considered "literature" and genres hitherto not regarded as "literary" such as children's writing, journals, letters, travel writing, and many others are now the subjects of scholarly interest. Most genres and subgenres have undergone a similar analysis, so literary studies have entered new territories such as the "female gothic" or women's science fiction.

According to Elyce Rae Helford, "Science fiction and fantasy serve as important vehicles for feminist thought, particularly as bridges between theory and practice." Feminist science fiction is sometimes taught at the university level to explore the role of social constructs in understanding gender. Notable texts of this kind are Ursula K. Le Guin's The Left Hand of Darkness (1969), Joanna Russ' The Female Man (1970), Octavia Butler's Kindred (1979), and Margaret Atwood's Handmaid's Tale (1985).

Feminist nonfiction has played an important role in voicing concerns about women's lived experiences. For example, Maya Angelou's I Know Why The Caged Bird Sings was extremely influential, as it represented the specific racism and sexism experienced by black women growing up in the United States.

In addition, many feminist movements have embraced poetry as a vehicle to communicate feminist ideas to public audiences through anthologies, poetry collections, and public readings.

== Feminist children's literature ==
Feminist children's literature is the writing of children's literature through a feminist lens. Children's literature and women's literature have many similarities. Both often deal with being weak and placed towards the bottom of a hierarchy. In this way feminist ideas are regularly found in the structure of children's literature. Feminist criticism of children's literature is therefore expected, since it is a type of feminist literature. Feminist children's literature has played a critical role for the feminist movement, especially in the past half century. In her book Feminism Is for Everybody: Passionate Politics, Bell Hooks states her belief that all types of media, including writing and children's books, need to promote feminist ideals. She argues "Children's literature is one of the most crucial sites for feminist education for critical consciousness precisely because beliefs and identities are still being formed".:)

== Feminist science fiction ==
Feminist science fiction is a subgenre of science fiction (abbreviated "SF") focused on theories that include feminist themes including but not limited to, gender inequality, sexuality, race, economics, and reproduction. Feminist SF is political because of its tendency to critique the dominant culture. Some of the most notable feminist science fiction works have illustrated these themes using utopias to explore a society in which gender differences or gender power imbalances do not exist, or dystopias to explore worlds in which gender inequalities are intensified, thus asserting a need for feminist work to continue.

Science fiction and fantasy serve as important vehicles for feminist thought, particularly as bridges between theory and practice. No other genres so actively invite representations of the ultimate goals of feminism: worlds free of sexism, worlds in which women's contributions (to science) are recognized and valued, worlds that explore the diversity of women's desire and sexuality, and worlds that move beyond gender.

— Elyce Rae Helford

== Popular feminist literature ==
- A Vindication of the Rights of Woman by Mary Wollstonecraft
- A Room of One's Own by Virginia Woolf
- Feminism is for Everybody by bell hooks
- Gender Outlaw by Kate Bornstein
- The House on Mango Street by Sandra Cisneros
- Bad Feminist by Roxane Gay
- Little Women by Louisa May Alcott
- Men Explain Things to Me by Rebecca Solnit
- Redefining Realness by Janet Mock
- Sister Outsider by Audre Lorde
- The Bell Jar by Sylvia Plath
- The Bloody Chamber by Angela Carter
- This Bridge Called My Back
- The Female Eunuch by Germaine Greer
- The Vagina Monologues by Eve Ensler
- In Search of Our Mothers' Gardens by Alice Walker
- The Feminine Mystique by Betty Friedan
- The Handmaid's Tale by Margaret Atwood
- The Second Sex by Simone de Beauvoir
- Women, Culture, and Politics by Angela Y. Davis
- The Golden Notebook by Doris Lessing

== See also ==
- List of feminist literature
- Feminist literary criticism
