= A Place of Rage =

1991 film by Pratibha Parmar

A Place of Rage is a 1991 film by Pratibha Parmar. The film includes interviews of Angela Davis, June Jordan, Trinh T. Minh-ha, and Alice Walker. It discusses and asks for political action regarding racism and homophobia, linking the two issues together. It was created to be aired on British television and it is 52 minutes long.

The main interviews of Davis, Jordan, and Walker were filmed in the present day. Davis and Jordan discuss the effects of Rosa Parks, Fannie Lou Hamer, and other activists; as well as women's roles in black churches during the Civil Rights Movement and the outcome of the 1960s Black Power movement. Parmar took a 1970 prison interview of Davis and intercuts scenes of poetry of June Jordan. The documentary also uses music from the Staple Singers, Neville Brothers, and Janet Jackson as well as documentary scenes of the 1960s.

The film title originates from how the interview subjects say there was a "place of rage" within black people in the 1960s where they collected anger from being oppressed and released it against the persons oppressing them. The interview subjects stated that by the 1990s this shifted to a sense of defeatism and internal repression characterized by drug use and resignation.

== Release and reception ==
It had been screened at various gay and lesbian international film festivals.

It won the 1992 National Black Programming Consortium "Best Historical Documentary" award.

Marjorie Baumgarten of the Austin Chronicle rated the film and Khush, another one of Parmar's films, as three out of five stars. Baumgarten stated that "whatever its forum, A Place of Rage's testimony, wisdom, compassion and renewal are nuggets that stay with you long after the images fade" and that "it is not quite fair to judge [A Place of Rage] as a feature film due to its length and purpose of airing on UK television.
