= Black, White, and Jewish =

2002 autobiography by Rebecca Walker

Black, White, and Jewish: Autobiography of a Shifting Self
- Author: Rebecca Walker
- Language: English
- Publisher: Riverhead Books
- Publication date: 2001
- Publication place: United States
- ISBN: 9781573229074
- OCLC: 48859956

Black, White, and Jewish: Autobiography of a Shifting Self (2002) is an autobiography by American feminist writer Rebecca Walker.

== About ==
Born in Jackson, Mississippi in 1969, and living there as a child, Rebecca Walker is the daughter of Alice Walker, a Black Protestant womanist writer, and Melvyn R. Leventhal, a white Jewish civil rights lawyer. Her parents became active in the later years of the Civil Rights Movement.

Walker explores her experience of living with two parents each with very active careers, which she believes led to their separation when she was young. She explores encountering racism in the South and the North, and the difficulties of being mixed-race in a society with rigid formal cultural barriers. The South certainly had a long history before the 20th century of mixed-race children born to Black mothers and white fathers.

Walker also discusses how her sexuality and religion set her apart: she has identified as a bisexual Black Jewish woman.

== See also ==
- African American Jews
