= Am I Blue =

Am I Blue may refer to:

- "Am I Blue?", a 1929 song written by Harry Akst and Grant Clarke
- Am I Blue (album), a 1963 album by jazz guitarist Grant Green
- "Am I Blue" (George Strait song), a 1987 song written by David Chamberlain
- Am I Blue (play), a play written by Beth Henley
- "Am I Blue?" (Essay), a 1986 essay written by Alice Walker.
- Am I Blue? Coming Out from the Silence, 1995 short story collection
