= Alice Walker: Beauty in Truth =

2013 American documentary film

- Directed by: Pratibha Parmar
- Written by: Pratibha Parmar
- Produced by: Pratibha Parmar; Shaheen Haq
- Cinematography: Simon Dennis
- Music by: Tena R. Clark; Tim Heintz
- Production company: Kali Films
- Distributed by: Paul Monaghan; Pratibha Parmar; Linda Peckham; Scott Radnor
- Release date: 2013
- Running time: 84 minutes
- Countries: United States; United Kingdom
- Language: English

Alice Walker: Beauty in Truth is a documentary film directed by Pratibha Parmar, made by Kali Films production company. The film follows the life of the Pulitzer Prize-winning author, poet and activist Alice Walker. Shooting began in May 2011. The documentary was first aired on BBC Four television on Sunday July 7, 2013, and on PBS on February 7, 2014.

Alice Walker and Pratibha Parmar have previously collaborated on A Place of Rage and Warrior Marks.

== Reception ==
Mary McNamara in a review for the Los Angeles Times described Alice Walker: Beauty in Truth as "a lovely and lyrical tribute", concluding: "... it isn't often we get to spend time with a person of such conviction under whose hands words bloom with both beauty and power. But then there really isn't another person like this. There's only Alice Walker." An article in Ms. Magazine stated: "It's a beautiful film: a testament to the power of narrative, textual and visual, and to finding your way when the path isn't always clear." The review in YES! magazine called it "a deeply moving film that deserved the standing ovations at its premiere screenings...as beautiful visually as it is spiritually. It’s a must-see."

=== Awards and recognition ===
The film was a nominee or winner of awards, including:

- Chicago International Film Festival 2013: Audience Choice Award (nomination)
- Seattle International Film Festival 2013: Documentary Award and Golden Space Needle Award (nomination)
- Philadelphia International Gay & Lesbian Film Festival 2013: Best Documentary (Director), Best Documentary
- Paris International Lesbian and Feminist Film Festival 2014: Best Documentary
