= Ashley Judd =

American actress (born 1968)

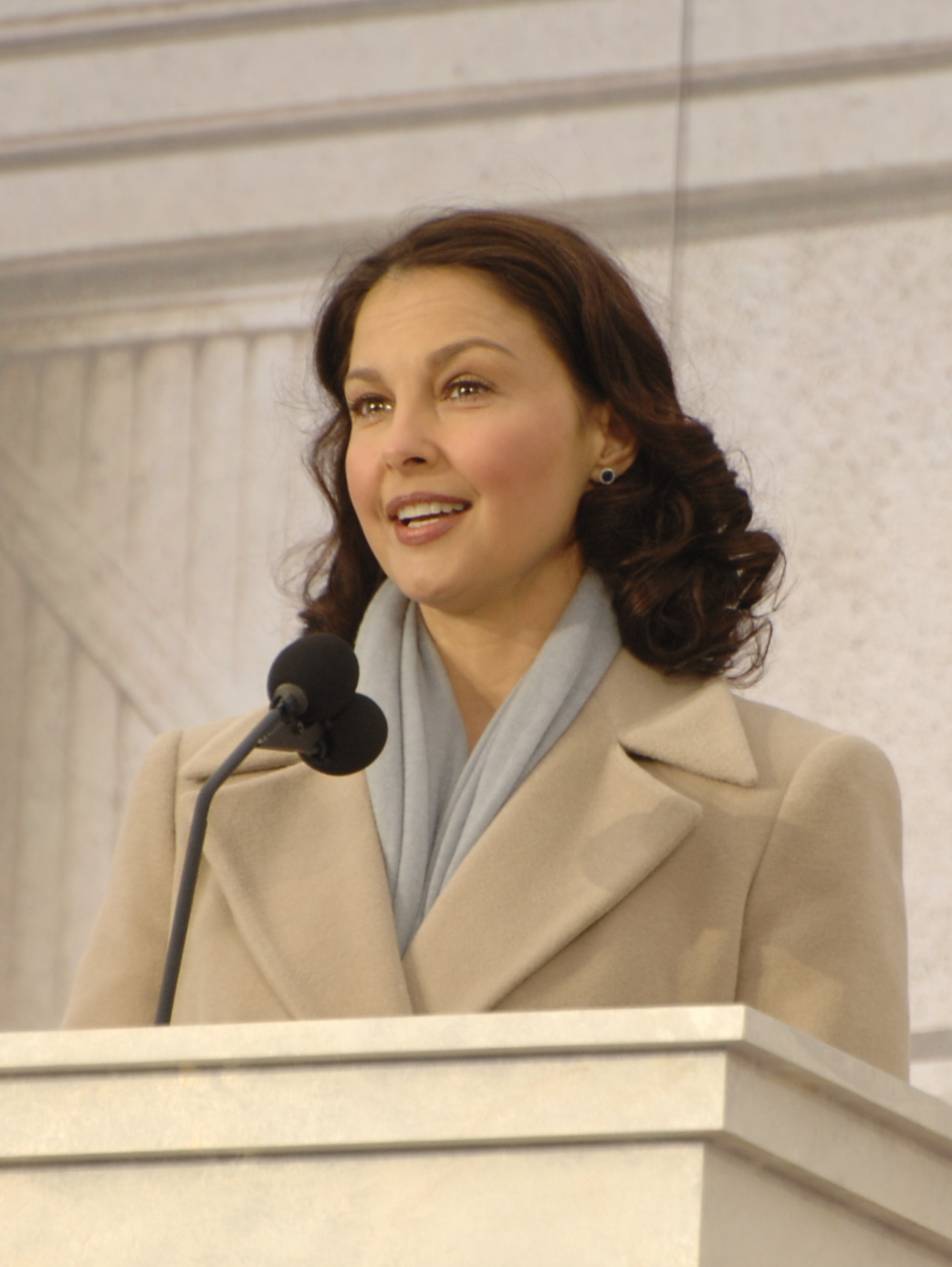
- Judd in 2009
- Born: Ashley Tyler Ciminella; April 19, 1968 (age 58); Los Angeles, California, U.S.
- Education: University of Kentucky (BA); Harvard University (MPA)
- Occupation: Actress
- Years active: 1991–present
- Political party: Democratic
- Spouse: Dario Franchitti (m. 2001; div. 2013)
- Mother: Naomi Judd
- Relatives: Wynonna Judd (half-sister)

Ashley Tyler Ciminella (born April 19, 1968), known professionally as Ashley Judd, is an American actress. She grew up in a family of performing artists, and is a daughter of singer Naomi Judd and the half-sister of singer Wynonna Judd. Her acting career has spanned more than three decades, and she has been involved in global humanitarian efforts and political activism. Judd made her television debut in 1991 with a guest role on two episodes of Star Trek: The Next Generation and her film debut in 1992's Kuffs.

== Early life ==
Ashley Tyler Ciminella was born on April 19, 1968, in Granada Hills, Los Angeles. Her parents are Naomi Judd, who later became a singer and motivational speaker, and Michael Charles Ciminella, a marketing analyst for the horse racing industry. Ashley's elder half-sister, Wynonna Judd, is also a country music singer.

Ashley's paternal grandfather was of Sicilian (Italian) descent, and her paternal grandmother was a descendant of Mayflower pilgrim William Brewster. In the miniseries, Civil War 360, she revealed that her great-great-great-grandfather, Elijah Hensley, was a Union soldier from Kentucky who fought at the Battle of Saltville in the Civil War.

When Judd was born, her mother was a homemaker. Judd's parents divorced in 1972 when she was four. The following year, Judd's mother, Naomi, returned with Ashley to Kentucky, where Judd lived for most of her childhood. Judd has stated that even if she professionally uses her mother's maiden name, her legal surname is still the Ciminella of her father, as "I loved both my last names and the branches of the family they represented", and the one time she tried to legally change it the judge refused it.

Judd attended 13 schools before college, including the Sayre School (Lexington, Kentucky), Paul G. Blazer High School (Ashland, Kentucky), and Franklin High School in Tennessee. She briefly tried modeling in Japan during a school break. At the University of Kentucky, she majored in French and minored in anthropology, art history, theater, and women's studies. She joined the sorority Kappa Kappa Gamma. Judd spent a semester studying in France as part of her major. She graduated from the University of Kentucky Honors Program and was nominated to Phi Beta Kappa.

After college Judd moved to Hollywood, where she studied with acting teacher Robert Carnegie at Playhouse West. During this time, she worked as a hostess at The Ivy restaurant and lived in a Malibu rental house. Around that time, she returned East to Williamson County, Tennessee, where she lived near her mother and sister.

== Career ==
Starting in 1991, Judd appeared as Ensign Robin Lefler, a Starfleet officer, in two episodes of Star Trek: The Next Generation, "Darmok" and "The Game". She had a recurring role as Reed Halsey, the daughter of Alex (Swoosie Kurtz), on the NBC drama Sisters.

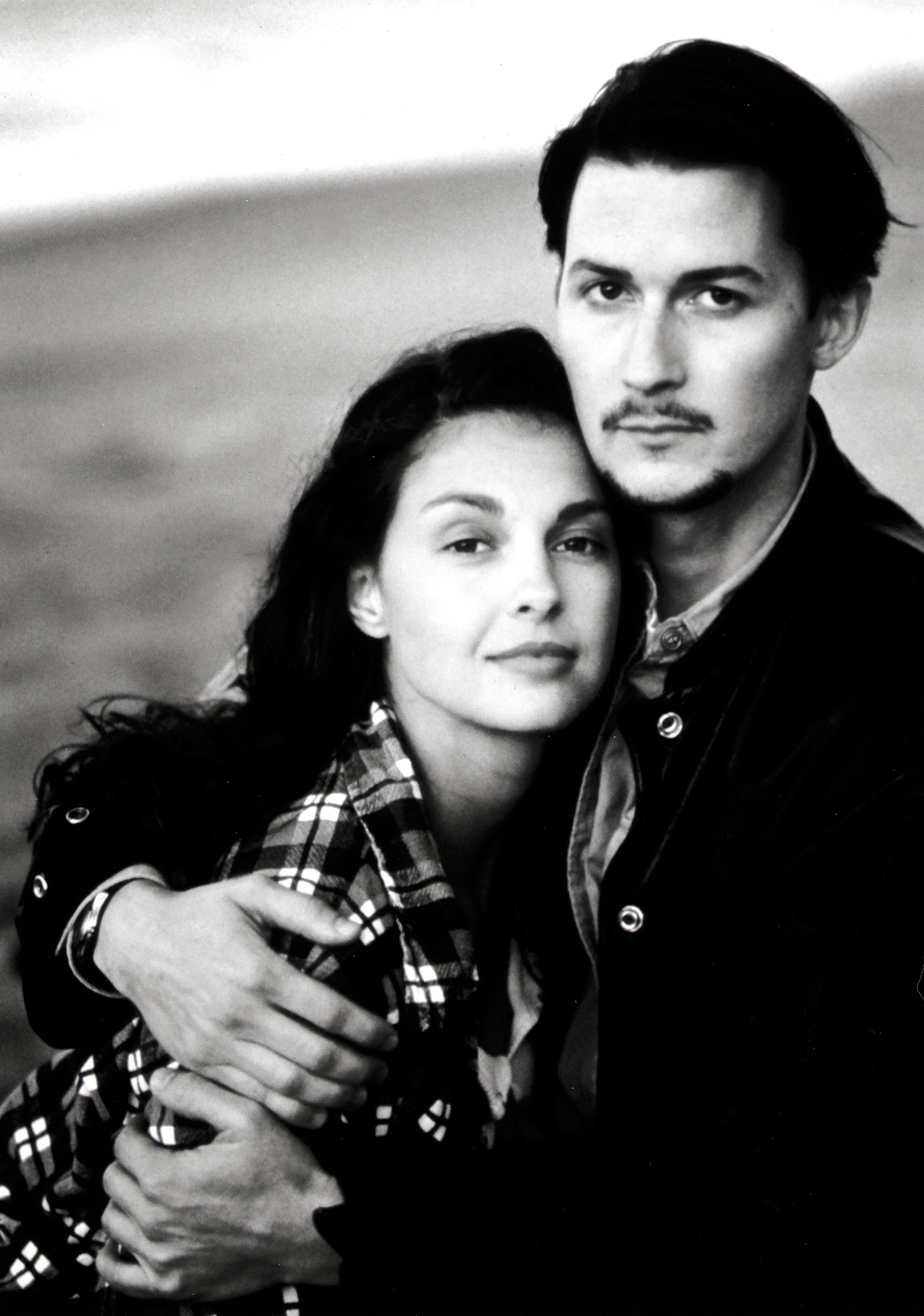
Judd and Todd Field in Victor Nuñez's Ruby in Paradise (1993)

She made her feature film debut with a small role in 1992's Kuffs. In 1993, she was cast in her first starring role playing the title character in Victor Nuñez's Ruby in Paradise. The latter film won the Sundance Film Festival Grand Jury Prize. Believing that this role would shape the rest of her career, Judd was extremely nervous before the audition, nearly getting into a car accident en route. "From the first three sentences, I knew it was written for me", she told the San Jose Mercury News. She received positive reviews in her role as Ruby Lee Gissing, a young woman trying to make a new life for herself.

Nuñez told biographer James L. Dickerson that Judd created the resonance of this character: "The resonance, those moments, was not contrived. It was just a matter of creating the scene and trusting that it was worth telling."

Oliver Stone, who had seen Judd in Nuñez's film, cast her in Natural Born Killers (1994), but her scenes were cut from the version of the film released theatrically. The following year, she gained critical acclaim for her role as Harvey Keitel's estranged daughter in Wayne Wang's Smoke and as Val Kilmer's wife in Michael Mann's Heat. That same year she played the role of Callie in Philip Ridley's dark adult fairy tale The Passion of Darkly Noon.

In 1996, she co-starred with Mira Sorvino as Marilyn Monroe in Norma Jean and Marilyn, where she recreated the photo shoot for the centerfold for the first issue of Playboy. The same year she had a supporting role in the thriller film A Time to Kill. It received positive reviews and was a major box office success. By the end of the 1990s, Judd had achieved considerable success as a leading actress, having lead roles in additional thrillers that performed well at the box office, including Kiss the Girls (1997) and Double Jeopardy (1999).

In the early 2000s she starred in Where the Heart Is (2000), Someone Like You (2001), and High Crimes (2002). These were moderate box office successes. In 2002, Judd starred in Divine Secrets of the Ya-Ya Sisterhood, which performed well, and acted in the critically acclaimed film Frida.

Judd played the role of Maggie the Cat in the 2003 Broadway revival of Tennessee Williams's Cat on a Hot Tin Roof.

In 2004 she received praise and a Golden Globe nomination for Best Actress, for her performance in De-Lovely, opposite Kevin Kline, who played Cole Porter. She also starred in Twisted (2004). This was widely panned.

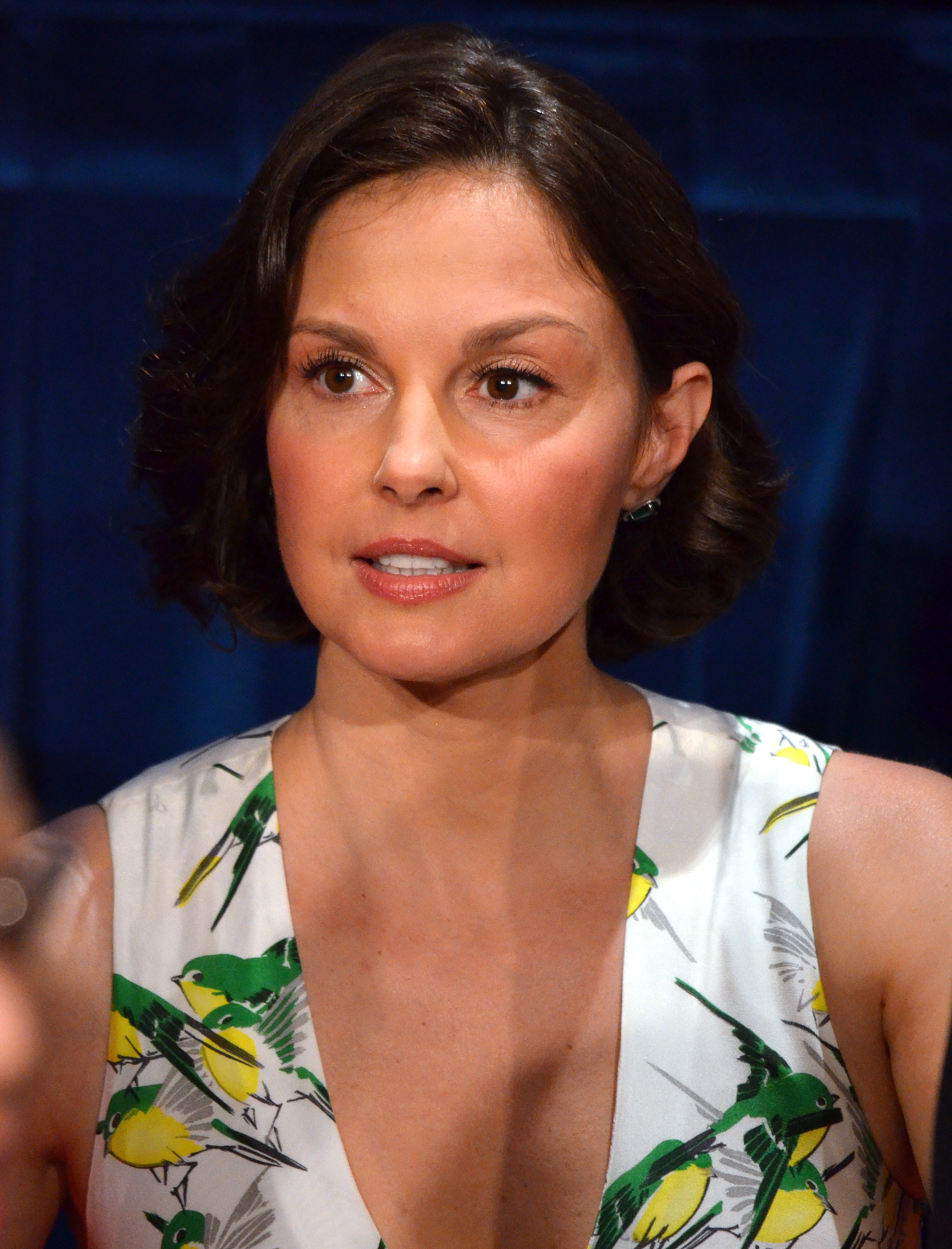
Judd at an ABC Missing event at The Paley Center in April 2012

In 2010, Judd was Janet Tamaro's original choice for the role of Detective Jane Rizzoli in the TV series Rizzoli & Isles but she declined. Angie Harmon took the role. In 2011, she co-starred in the family film Dolphin Tale and its 2014 sequel, Dolphin Tale 2. Also in 2011, Judd co-starred with Patrick Dempsey in the film Flypaper. In 2012, she starred as Rebecca Winstone on the ABC series Missing.

In 2013, Judd played First Lady Margaret Asher in the action thriller Olympus Has Fallen. In 2014, she appeared as Natalie Prior in Divergent, which she reprised in the 2015 sequel The Divergent Series: Insurgent and the 2016 penultimate film of the series The Divergent Series: Allegiant.

In 2014, Judd was the narrator of the documentary film about Turkish preacher Fethullah Gülen, Love Is a Verb, directed by Terry Spencer Hesser. The following year she became the first woman to narrate the opening for the telecast of the Kentucky Derby.

=== Sponsorships ===
Starting in 2004, Judd was the advertising "face" of American Beauty, an Estée Lauder cosmetic brand sold at Kohl's department stores, and of H. Stern jewelers. In June 2007, Goody's Family Clothing launched three fashion clothing lines with Judd in the fall to be called "AJ", "Love Ashley", and "Ashley Judd". In 2008 they added an "Ashley Judd Plus" line.

== Personal life ==
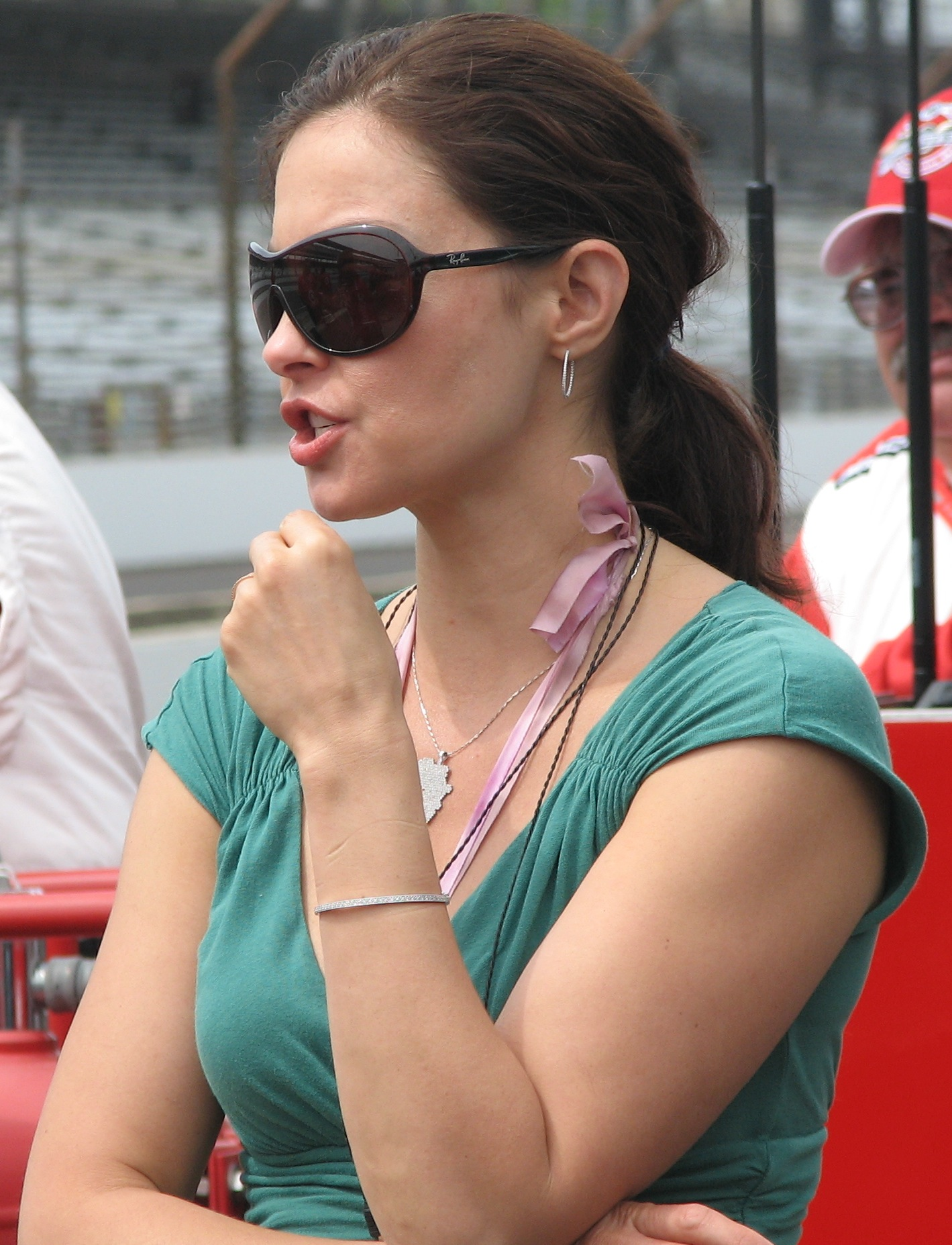
Judd at the second day of qualifications for the 2009 Indianapolis 500

In December 1999, Judd became engaged to Dario Franchitti, a Scottish racing driver who competed in Championship Auto Racing Teams (CART). They married in December 2001 at Skibo Castle in Scotland. They did not have any children, as she is known to have said: "It's unconscionable to breed with the number of children who are starving to death in impoverished countries." They divorced in 2013.

Judd is an avid martial arts practitioner: she has practiced kickboxing, judo, and Tae Bo.

In February 2006, she entered a program at Shades of Hope Treatment Center in Buffalo Gap, Texas and stayed for 47 days. She was there for treatment of depression, insomnia, and codependency.

In 2011, Judd released her memoir All That is Bitter and Sweet, in which she discusses her life from adolescence to adulthood. The memoir concentrates on her humanitarian work as an adult.

In February 2021, while hiking in the jungle in the Democratic Republic of the Congo, Judd shattered her leg. Porters transported her for 55 hours to reach a hospital for surgery in South Africa.

Judd is a Christian and said her faith was why she went public against Harvey Weinstein.

=== Education ===
In May 2007, Judd received a B.A. in French at the University of Kentucky. She was awarded an Honorary DHL degree from Union College in Barbourville, Kentucky, on May 9, 2009. Judd undertook postgraduate study, earning a mid-career MPA degree from Harvard Kennedy School in 2010.

In August 2016, Judd enrolled at UC Berkeley to pursue a PhD in Public Policy at the Goldman School of Public Policy. She took a medical leave of absence two months later because she was suffering from migraines.

=== Interests ===
Judd follows sports at her alma mater, and has attended many University of Kentucky basketball games.

During the 2007 IndyCar season, Judd criticized allowing rookie Milka Duno to race. After the final race, Judd said to reporters, "I know this is not very sportsmanlike, but they've got to get the 23 car (Duno) off the track. It's very dangerous. I'm tired of holding my tongue. She shouldn't be out there. When a car is 10 miles [an hour] off the pace, it's not appropriate to be racing. People's lives are at stake."

=== Sexual harassment and assault ===
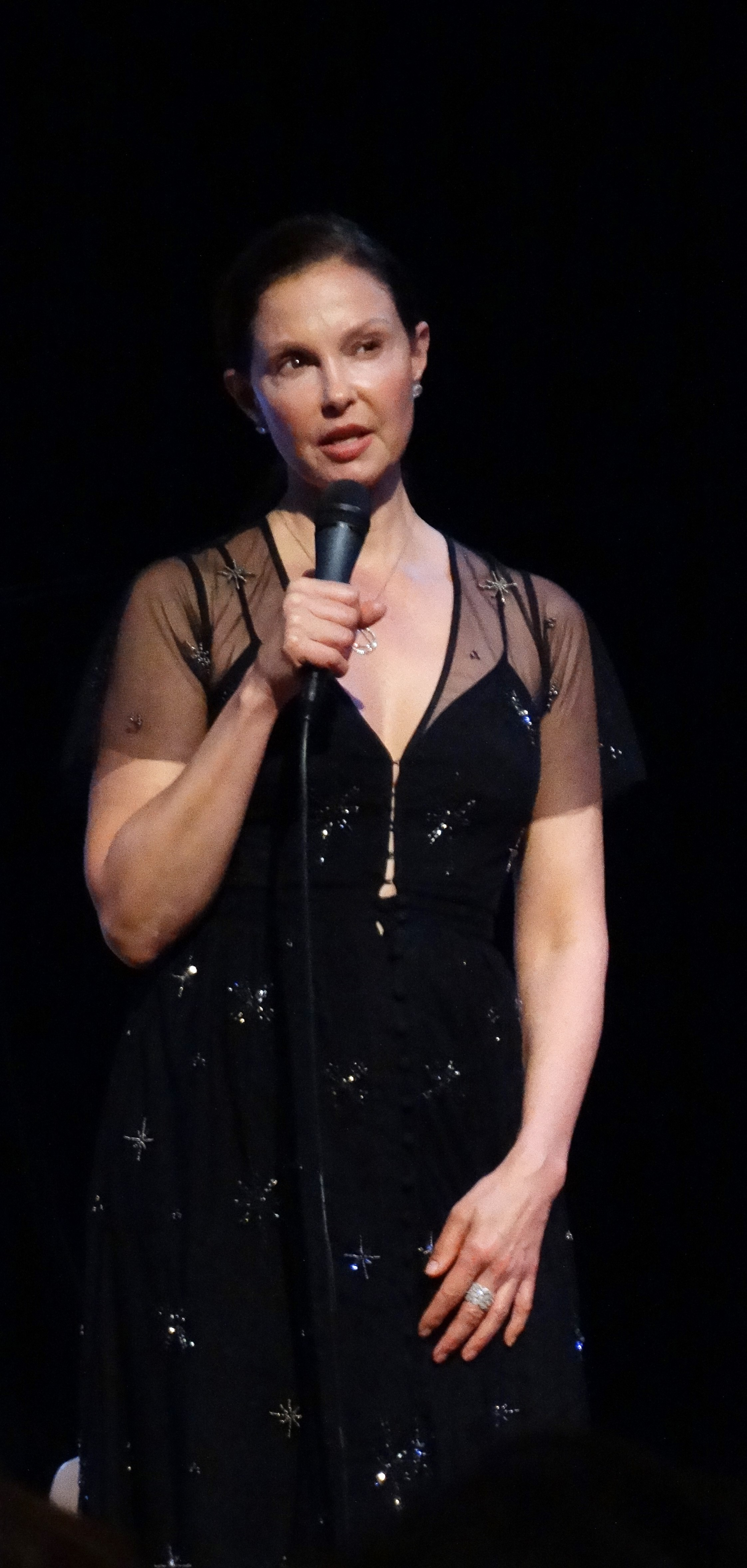
Ashley Judd, as the patron of the event #MeToo & Prostitution: Survivors Break the Silence! in Paris in 2018.

In October 2015, Judd told Variety that she had been sexually harassed by a studio mogul but did not name the person. In October 2017, she said the person was Harvey Weinstein, co-founder of Miramax, and said that the sexual harassment occurred during the filming of Kiss the Girls.

On April 30, 2018, Judd filed a defamation and sexual harassment lawsuit against Weinstein, stating that he hurt her career by spreading lies about her after she rejected his sexual advances and derailed her potential involvement in The Lord of the Rings trilogy. In January 2019, a federal judge in California dismissed Judd's claim of sexual harassment against Weinstein but allowed Judd to pursue her defamation claim that Weinstein sabotaged her career. In July 2020, the Ninth Circuit reversed the judge, reviving the sexual harassment claim. In 2023, the lawsuit was administratively closed after having been stayed since 2019 due to ongoing criminal proceedings.

At the Women in the World summit in April 2019, Judd addressed Georgia's six-week abortion ban, which had been passed in March 2019. She said that she had been raped three times, and became pregnant once. She said: "As everyone knows, and I'm very open about it, I'm a three-time rape survivor. One of the times that I was raped there was conception and I'm very thankful I was able to access safe and legal abortion. Because the rapist, who is a Kentuckian, as am I, and I reside in Tennessee, has paternity rights in Kentucky and Tennessee, I would've had to co-parent with my rapist".

== Activism ==
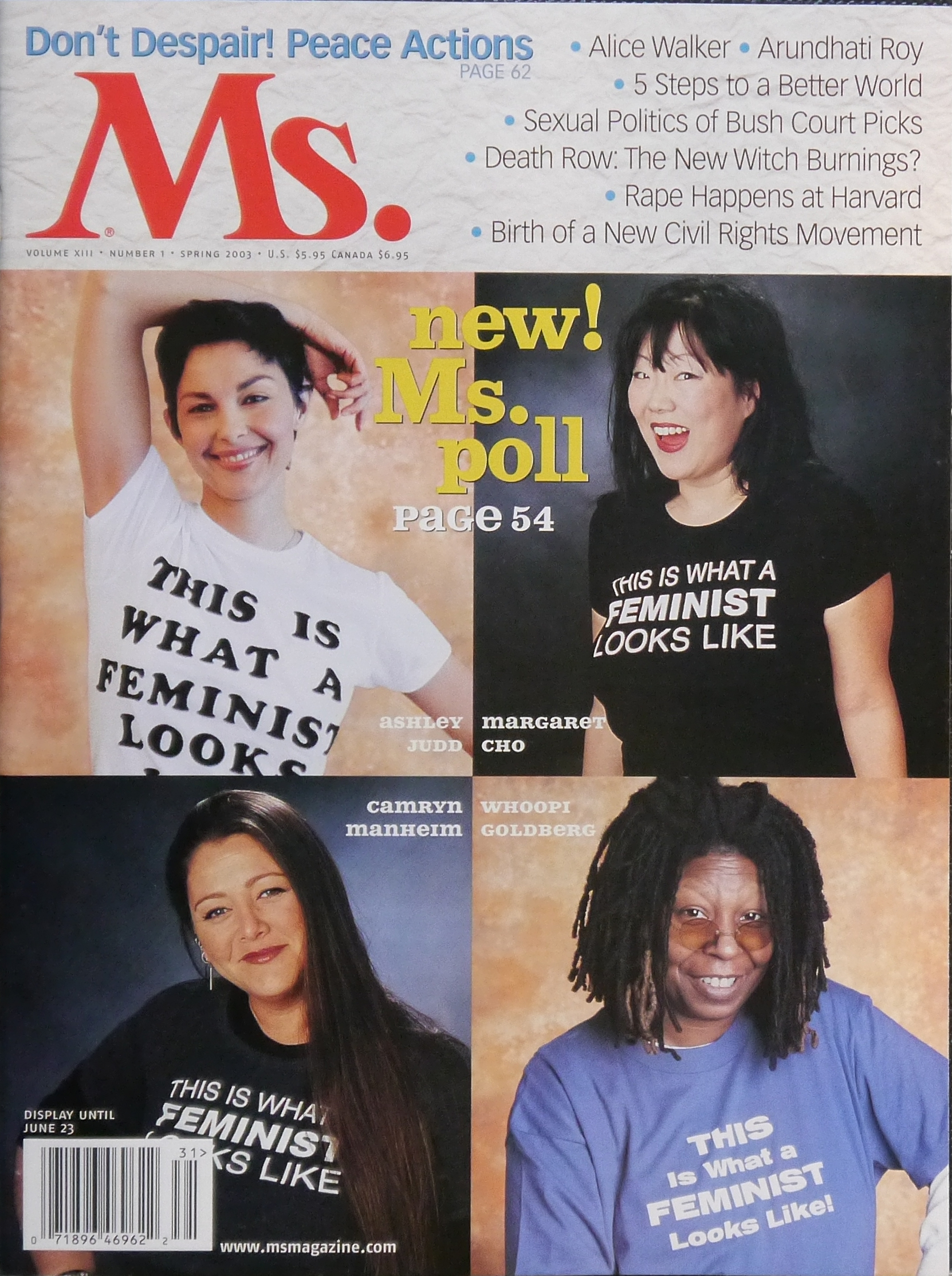
Judd (upper left) on the cover of Ms. magazine's "This is what a feminist looks like" 2003 issue

Judd has conducted humanitarian work that focuses on gender equality, pro choice causes and the rights of women and girls. In 2016, she was appointed a Goodwill Ambassador for UNFPA, the United Nations agency with responsibilities including sexual and reproductive health. As of May 2018, she had visited UNFPA's projects for women and girls affected by humanitarian crises in Jordan, Turkey, Ukraine, and Bangladesh, and its development work in India and Sri Lanka.

Judd has travelled with YouthAIDS to places affected by illness and poverty, such as Cambodia, Kenya, and Rwanda. She has become an advocate for preventing poverty and promoting awareness internationally. She has met with political and religious leaders on behalf of the deprived about political and social change. Judd has narrated three documentaries for YouthAIDS that aired on the Discovery Channel, in National Geographic and on VH1.

In 2011, she joined the Leadership Council of the International Center for Research on Women. Other organizations Judd has been involved with include Women for Women International and Equality Now. She is a member of the advisory board for Apne Aap Women Worldwide, an organization fighting sex-trafficking and inter-generational prostitution in India. Judd is active on the speakers' circuit, giving speeches about gender equality, abuse and humanitarian topics.

== Political activities ==
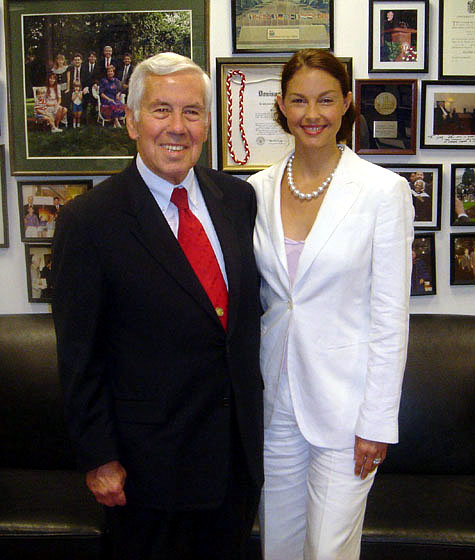
Judd meeting with Senator Richard Lugar in 2005

In 2008, Judd supported Barack Obama's presidential campaign. In 2009, she appeared in a one-minute video advertisement for the Defenders of Wildlife Action Fund, in which Judd condemned Alaska Governor Sarah Palin for supporting aerial wolf hunting. In response, Palin stated the reason these wolves are killed is to protect the caribou population in Alaska. Palin called the Defenders of Wildlife Action Fund an "extreme fringe group". In 2010, Judd signed the Animal Legal Defense Fund's petition to urge Kentucky Governor Steve Beshear to protect that state's homeless animals through tough enforcement of Kentucky's Humane Shelter Law.

She was appointed Global Ambassador for YouthAIDS, an education and prevention program of the international NGO Population Services International (PSI), promoting AIDS prevention and treatment. Judd was honored November 10, 2009, as the recipient of the fourth annual USA Today Hollywood Hero, awarded for her work with PSI. On October 29, 2006, Judd appeared at a "Women for Ford" event for Democratic Tennessee Senate candidate Harold Ford Jr. She has also campaigned extensively both locally and nationally for a variety of Democratic candidates, including President Barack Obama in critical swing states.

On September 8, 2010, CNN interviewed Judd about her second humanitarian mission to the Democratic Republic of the Congo. Judd traveled with the Enough Project, a project to end genocide and crimes against humanity. In the interview, Judd discussed her efforts to raise awareness about how conflict minerals fuel sexual violence in Congo. During her trip, Judd visited hospitals for victims of sexual violence, camps for displaced persons, mines, and civil society organizations. On September 30, 2010, CNN published an op-ed titled "Ashley Judd: Electronics fuel unspeakable violence" by Judd and Enough Project co-founder John Prendergast regarding the continued violence in Congo. On November 26, 2010, she published a subsequent op-ed, "Costs of Convenience", excerpted from her trip diary from eastern Congo. These pieces discussed the recent provision in the Dodd-Frank Reform bill that requires companies to prove where their minerals originated, and the link between modern electronics (which rely on those minerals) and mining camps plagued by such violence.

Judd represented Tennessee as a delegate to the 2012 Democratic National Convention. She also considered returning to Kentucky and challenging Senator Mitch McConnell in 2014. In response, the conservative Super PAC American Crossroads released an attack ad against Judd in Kentucky.

In February 2013, she invited her Twitter followers to join a mailing list, hinting that she might ultimately announce a run for the Senate to those on the list. However, she announced on March 27, 2013, that she would not run, citing her need to be focused on her family. Judd later endorsed Kentucky Secretary of State Alison Lundergan Grimes.

On July 26, 2016, Judd attended a Creative Coalition luncheon in support of DC Statehood that took place during the Democratic National Convention in Philadelphia. The event, hosted by Washington, DC Mayor Muriel Bowser and Del. Eleanor Holmes Norton, also included actors Elizabeth Banks, Tim Daly, Josh Gad, William Baldwin and David Schwimmer.

In January 2020, Judd endorsed Democratic Senator Elizabeth Warren in her run for the presidency.

On July 12, 2024, Judd wrote an op-ed for USA Today calling on President Joe Biden to suspend his 2024 reelection campaign. She wrote that Biden was "incapable of countering Trump, while he, unchecked, gushed a firehose of galling lies" at the first presidential debate of the cycle in late June 2024. The Independent called it "a deeply personal and heartfelt op-ed".

== Filmography ==
=== Film ===
Year	Title	Role	Notes
1992	Kuffs	Paint store owner's wife	
1993	Ruby in Paradise	Ruby Lee Gissing	
1995	Heat	Charlene Shiherlis	
1995	Smoke	Felicity	
1995	The Passion of Darkly Noon	Callie	
1996	A Time to Kill	Carla Brigance	
1996	Normal Life	Pam Anderson	
1997	Kiss the Girls	Dr. Kate McTiernan	
1997	The Locusts	Kitty	
1998	Simon Birch	Rebecca Wenteworth	
1999	Double Jeopardy	Elizabeth 'Libby' Parsons	
1999	Eye of the Beholder	Joanna Eris	
2000	Where the Heart Is	Lexie Coop	
2001	Someone Like You	Jane Goodale	Released as Animal Attraction in the United Kingdom
2002	Frida	Tina Modotti	
2002	Divine Secrets of the Ya-Ya Sisterhood	Younger Vivi Abbott Walker	
2002	High Crimes	Claire Kubik	
2004	De-Lovely	Linda Porter	
2004	Twisted	Jessica Shepard	
2006	Come Early Morning	Lucy Fowler	
2006	Bug	Agnes White	
2009	Helen	Helen Leonard	
2009	Crossing Over	Denise Frankel	
2010	Tooth Fairy	Carly Harris-Thompson	
2011	Dolphin Tale	Lorraine Nelson	
2011	Flypaper	Kaitlin	
2013	Olympus Has Fallen	First Lady Margaret Asher	
2014	Divergent	Natalie Prior	
2014	The Identical	Louise Wade	
2014	Dolphin Tale 2	Lorraine Nelson	
2014	Big Stone Gap	Ave Maria Mulligan	
2015	The Divergent Series: Insurgent	Natalie Prior	
2016	The Divergent Series: Allegiant	Natalie Prior	
2016	Barry	Ann Dunham	
2016	Good Kids	Gabby	
2017	Trafficked	Diane	
2019	A Dog's Way Home	Terri	
2022	She Said	Herself	
2022	My Name is Andrea	Andrea Dworkin	
2024	Lazareth	Lee	

=== Television ===
Year	Title	Role	Notes
1991	Star Trek: The Next Generation	Ensign Robin Lefler	Episodes: "Darmok", "The Game"
1991–1994	Sisters	Reed Halsey	Recurring role (season 2–4), 32 episodes
1994	Naomi & Wynonna: Love Can Build a Bridge	Herself	Television film; (Note: Film based on The Judds' life. Megan Ward portrays Ashley in the film.) Voice role
1994	Space Ghost Coast to Coast	Herself	Episode: "Elevator"
1996	Norma Jean & Marilyn	Norma Jean	Television film
2012	Missing	Becca Winstone	Main role
2013	Call Me Crazy: A Five Film	Unknown	Directed "Maggie" segment
2013	Civil War 360	Herself	Episode: "The Union"
2017	Twin Peaks	Beverly Paige	4 episodes
2017–2019	Berlin Station	B.B. Yates	Main role (season 2); Recurring role (season 3)
2022	Naomi Judd: A River of Time Celebration	Herself	Naomi's memorial

=== Documentaries ===
Year	Title	Role	Notes
2007	India's Hidden Plague	Herself	
2014	Love Is a Verb	Narrator	
2025	The Judds: Truth Be Told	Herself	

== Book ==
- Judd, Ashley with Maryanne Vollers (2011). All That Is Bitter & Sweet: A Memoir. Ballantine Books. ISBN 978-0-345-52361-7.

== Accolades ==
=== Awards and nominations ===
Year	Nominated work	Award	Category	Result
1993	Ruby in Paradise	Chicago Film Critics Association Award	Most Promising Actress	Won
1993	Ruby in Paradise	Independent Spirit Award	Best Lead Female	Won
1993	Ruby in Paradise	National Society of Film Critics Award	Best Actress	Nominated
1993	Ruby in Paradise	New York Film Critics Circle Awards	Best Actress	Nominated
1995	Norma Jean & Marilyn	Golden Globe Award	Best Actress – Miniseries or Television Film	Nominated
1996	Norma Jean & Marilyn	Primetime Emmy Award	Outstanding Lead Actress in a Miniseries or a Movie	Nominated
1998	Kiss the Girls	Blockbuster Entertainment Award	Favorite Actress – Video	Nominated
1998	Kiss the Girls	Blockbuster Entertainment Award	Favorite Actress – Suspense	Nominated
1998	Kiss the Girls	Satellite Award	Best Supporting Actress – Motion Picture	Nominated
2000	Double Jeopardy	Blockbuster Entertainment Award	Favorite Actress – Suspense	Won
2000	Double Jeopardy	MTV Movie Award	Best Female Performance	Nominated
2004	De-Lovely	Golden Globe Award	Best Actress – Motion Picture Musical or Comedy	Nominated
2007	Bug	Saturn Award	Best Actress	Nominated
2012	Missing	Primetime Emmy Award	Outstanding Lead Actress in a Miniseries or a Movie	Nominated

=== Honors ===
- Kentucky Colonel
- Honorary Doctor of Humane Letters, Union College, Barbourville, Kentucky
- 2017 Time Person of the Year, as part of the "Silence Breakers"
- 2023 Dr. Maria Montessori Ambassador Award from the American Montessori Society
