= Norwood v. Harrison =

- Supreme Court of the United States

Argued February 20–21, 1973 Decided June 25, 1973
- Full case name: Norwood, et al. v. Harrison, et al.
- Citations: 413 U.S. 455 (more) 93 S. Ct. 2804; 37 L. Ed. 2d 723; 1973 U.S. LEXIS 28
- Argument: Oral argument

Case history
- Prior: 340 F. Supp. 1003 (N.D. Miss. 1972); probable jurisdiction noted, 409 U.S. 839 (1972).
- Subsequent: On remand, 382 F. Supp. 921 (N.D. Miss. 1974); attorneys' fees awarded, 410 F. Supp. 133 (N.D. Miss. 1976); affirmed, 581 F.2d 518 (5th Cir. 1978).

Holding
- Private schools have the right to exist and to operate, but the State is not required by the Equal Protection Clause to provide assistance to private schools equivalent to that it provides to public schools without regard to whether the private schools discriminate on racial grounds.

Court membership
- Chief Justice Warren E. Burger Associate Justices William O. Douglas · William J. Brennan Jr. Potter Stewart · Byron White; Thurgood Marshall · Harry Blackmun; Lewis F. Powell Jr. · William Rehnquist

Case opinions
- Majority: Burger, joined by Stewart, White, Marshall, Blackmun, Powell, Rehnquist
- Concurrence: Douglas
- Concurrence: Brennan

Norwood v. Harrison, 413 U.S. 455 (1973), is a United States Supreme Court decision in which the court held that a state cannot provide aid to a private school which discriminates on the basis of race.

== Facts of the Case ==
Textbooks were being purchased by the state of Mississippi and given to students for free in both public and private schools pursuant a statute passed in 1940. Among the schools with students receiving textbooks was Tunica Academy, which declined to attest that it had a racially non-discriminatory admissions policy. The District Court decided in favor of the state and the Supreme Court heard oral arguments February 20 and 21, 1973. The case was argued by civil rights attorney Melvyn R. Leventhal.

== The Court's Decision ==
The Supreme Court ruled that a state may not constitutionally give or lend textbooks to students who attend a school that discriminates on the basis of race, otherwise the discriminatory conduct of the private school could be considered state action and would thus be in violation of the Constitution.

The opinion of the court was authored by Chief Justice Burger and was joined by Stewart, White, Marshall, Blackmun, Powell, and Rehnquist. Justices Douglas and Brennan wrote concurring opinions.

The Court held that the Equal Protection Clause did not protect aid to private school students who attended racially segregated private schools because private schools are not a suspect class. The Court said there was no need to make a finding on the State's intent because the program had the impermissible effect of aiding the "organization and continuation of a separate system of private schools which, under the District Court holding, may discriminate if they so desire."
