= Everyday Use =

Short story by Alice Walker

- Short story by Alice Walker
- Country: United States
- Language: English

Publication
- Published in: Harper's Magazine
- Publication date: April 1973

"Everyday Use" is a short story by Alice Walker. It was first published in the April 1973 issue of Harper's Magazine and is part of Walker's short story collection In Love and Trouble.

== Plot ==
=== Characters ===
- Dee: She is an educated African-American woman and the eldest daughter of Mrs. Johnson. She seeks to embrace her cultural identity through changing her name from Dee to Wangero Leewanika Kemanjo (an African name), marrying a Muslim man, and acquiring artifacts from Mama's house to put on display, an approach that puts her at odds with Mama and Maggie. She is physically beautiful and is described as having a great sense of style.
- Mama/Mrs. Johnson: She is described as a "large, big-boned woman with rough, man-working hands." She enjoys her lifestyle (especially milking cows) and did not receive an education past second grade. She is against Dee's way of living, but says nothing about it in order to respect her and stay civil.
- Maggie: Mrs Johnson describes her as dull and much more brittle and quiet compared to her older sister. She is Mama's youngest daughter, who has burn scars and marks from the burning down of their prior home and she is very nervous and self-conscious because of it. She leads a simple and traditional life with her mother in the South while her elder sister, Dee, is away at school. She has very limited reading ability, unlike her sister Dee.
- Hakim-a-Barber: Dee's partner who is referred to as "Asalamalakim", a Muslim greeting, throughout the story because he is Muslim. Eventually, he tells Mama to call him "Hakim-a-Barber" due to Mama being unable to pronounce his real name. According to Helga Hoel, "The mother in the story, Mrs. Johnson, at first thinks this is his name, that he introduces himself, and some confusion arises until he tells her that she can call him Hakim-a-Barber."

=== Themes ===
One of the primary themes that the story revolves around is the idea of a person's relationship with their heritage. In the story, Dee's mother remained close to family traditions, while Dee herself chose to search more deeply into her African roots. Dee has a different mindset; she does not have the same ideals as Mama and Maggie, particularly in regard to cultural preservation and the best way to go about it. Dee (Wangero) only wants the family heirlooms to display in her home for their "artistic value", whereas Maggie and her mother cherish these items because they "remind them of their loved ones." In Mama's mind, Maggie learning to make her own quilt and putting it to everyday use is preserving the culture, which is how Mama believes the quilt should be used. Even if the quilts "end up in rags," more quilts can simply be made because Maggie was taught how to make them. On the other hand, Dee believes the proper way to preserve her culture is to display the quilt in her home and preserve the quilt itself rather than continuing to live out their culture as Mama and Maggie do.

=== Point of view ===
The story is told in first-person as it unfolds through the eyes and opinions of Mama. As Maggie and Mama wait for Dee to arrive for a visit, Mama's mind wanders with various thoughts and memories of Dee, giving the audience an impartial view of Dee as being self-centered and uncaring. Due to the fact that readers are getting only one viewpoint, it is uncertain if Dee truly does exhibit these characteristics or if it is only Mama's opinion of the eldest daughter that is being forced upon us. It is thought by some that Mama does not judge her children, Dee and Maggie, accurately due to Mama's own insecurities. This is evidenced during Mama's daydream of Dee and herself on an imaginary popular talk show under the context of children who have "made it". Mama notes that her being overweight and rough around the edges alludes to the fact that Dee is ashamed of Mama's appearance. As Mama continues to narrate the story, the audience continues to get a sense of Dee's snobbish personality, along with moments of doubt as readers see glimpses of Mama's own shortcomings. As the story concludes, the audience is left with the vision of Mama and Maggie remaining alone on the front lawn basking in the simplicity of each other and the straightforward life that has been built.

=== Interpretations ===
In the essay "'Everyday Use' and the Black Power Movement" by Barbara T. Christian, the story is discussed in reference to slavery and the Black power movement. The characters in the story focus a lot on African culture and heritage. Traditional African clothing is described throughout the story, and this is a symbol of the family's heritage. The mentioning of changing names relates back to slavery as well; the characters were trying to forget about their slave names, and think of more traditional names to remember their culture and assert their African roots. Christian brings to light the difference in attitudes and perspectives about a shared culture. Christian points out that to Maggie and her mother, honoring their culture meant honoring the personal past of their family, by carrying on their names or putting the quilt to use, while to Dee, that meant honoring aesthetic and ancient traditions, such as traditional African names or hanging the quilt to be seen but not utilized. It is this very realization that leads to their mother choosing to give Maggie the quilts.

On the other hand, in the essay "'Everyday Use' as a Portrait of the Artist" by Mary Helen Washington, the story is looked at from a more artistic and cultural perspective. The essay describes Dee as an artist who "returns home...in order to collect the material," which indicates that Dee comes home for a deeper understanding of her African culture. Although she changes her name from Dee to a more Native African name and wears African clothing, she lacks real knowledge of her culture. Because of this, Mama chooses Maggie over Dee to take the quilts, because Maggie shows more appreciation and knowledge of their culture and as she said in the story was involved in the making of those quilts whereas Dee had no part in.

In the essay "Stylish vs. Sacred in 'Everyday Use'" written by Houston A. Baker and Charlotte Pierce-Baker Dee or Wangero is called a "goddess". After highlighting a few passages from the story, it is mentioned that Dee/Wangero has joined the black nationalists of the 1960s and 1970s and she shows it by changing both her name and her style. The essay doesn't see Dee/Wangero as an activist of that cause but as someone being "manipulated by the style-makers" as illustrated by the scene in which she described the quilt, for which she passionately fought for later in the story, as "old-fashioned and out of style".

Helga Hoel, in "Personal Names and Heritage: Alice Walker's 'Everyday Use'", argues that because Dee's new name "Wangero Leewanika Kemanjo" is misspelled, that Dee "is confused and has only superficial knowledge of Africa and all it stands for".. This combined with West African dress that Dee wears, is a "pan East African mixture". Hoel argues that the "confusion of misunderstood cultural bits and pieces from all over Africa" is intentional on the part of Walker, in order to portray Dee as "a very shallow and superficial young woman who does not bother to check her sources."

=== Symbolism ===
One symbol found in the story is the quilt. The quilt serves as a very sentimental piece that holds great meaning and history behind it for the characters involved. It includes clothes that Dee's great-grandmother used to wear as well as pieces of uniforms that Dee's great-grandfather wore during the Civil War. It also symbolizes value in African-American experience. The quilt additionally represents the idea that women pass down history from generation to generation through creative activities as a part of their heritage. Dee seems to take more pride than the other characters in making these quilts, and she views it as her way of giving back to society.

Hakim-a-Barber and Wangero represented the Black Power movement by their styles, greets, and outfits. This coincides with the setting of the story, being lets in the late 60s-early 70s and being published during this period. During this period that Black Power movement was growing quickly and reshaping the civil rights landscape in the United States as the movement evolved.

Another symbol present in "Everyday Use" is the yard. The yard plays an important role in the story and is described as "an extended living room". Mama and Maggie have both tidied up the yard in preparation of Dee's visit, and sit out in the yard for hours, even after Dee's departure. The yard seems to be a place to think for Mama, where she can imagine herself being someone more conventionally attractive than she actually is, but also remember just how much she has done for her family.

=== Quilting ===
In the African-American community, women have engaged in the tradition of quilting since they were brought to America as slaves. Quilting requires sewing pieces of cloth together to create a coverlet that functions as both a piece of art and a household item. African-American women, often regarded as voiceless ‘mule(s) of the world’, inherited such creative legacies from maternal ancestors and their quilts have come to represent black heritage. The voices of African-American women have been stitched into their quilts, providing an account of their cultural past. As Sam Whitsitt observes, the quilt reflects the experiences of African-American women: the quilt is a symbol reflective of ‘herstory, history, and tradition’. The self-expression involved in quilt-making allowed women to take control of their lives through the only medium society permitted them to use. The communal nature of quilting strengthened the bonds of sisterhood and helped to move marginalized women from enslavement to empowerment. Quilting allowed these women to assert control over the colonial practice of slavery as enforced by white hegemony. Historically, products such as cotton and indigo dye were acquired as a result of black oppression. By sewing cotton into their quilts, African-American slaves formed a bond with nature, which replaced the hegemonic relationship enforced by slavery.

Black slaves often attended communal Quilting Bees, which offered these oppressed women the opportunity to create social bonds unsupervised. Thus, quilting became a symbol of sisterly solidarity for African-American slaves. Additionally, quilting functioned as a response to cultural and political change, allowing opportunity for political debate. Black women used quilting as a source of activism: their quilts often depicted anti-slavery slogans. However, quilting also came to represent the hegemony of patriarchal society. Women were often forced to learn to quilt, which became a substitute for the more ‘masculine’ activity of reading and writing.

Jennifer Martin explains in her article "The Quilt Threads Together Sisterhood, Empowerment, and Nature in Alice Walker's The Color Purple and 'Everyday Use'", "When women participate in the tradition of quilting this trinity of strength provides a positive channel for them to mend together the pieces of their lives and to move from fragmentation to fusion... Martin emphasize the quilt provides a bond between girls and women in the African-American community because women are often oppressed. Quilting is not an end-point where women achieve elusive wholeness, but a way to meld together parts of their lives and achieve power from the joining of all the components that make them unique." This also explains why Mama and Maggie are so fond of their heritage and continuing to live it out, unlike Dee. They see it as a way to feel connected to one another, as well as to their ancestors, and as a way to mend their pasts and move on from them. By showing their culture and living it still, they are able to show how despite everything that may have happened to them they never lost who they really were. Quilting symbolizes this movement for them and this feeling of wholeness.

Quilting features in "Everyday Use" as a symbol of black heritage. Mama Johnson's quilts symbolize cross-generational female bonding: they were sewn together by Grandma Dee, passed down to and then quilted by Mama and her sister, Big Dee. One quilt even features a piece of the uniform worn by their Great Grandpa Ezra during the Civil War. These quilts represent the creativity of the sisterhood that created them; however, Mama's daughters, Maggie and Dee, view them very differently. Dee visits her family, intending to collect the artifacts of her family's past; she wants to display them in her home with museum-like accuracy. As David Cowart notes, ‘The visitor [Dee] rightly recognizes the quilts as part of a fragile heritage, but she fails to see the extent to which she herself has traduced that heritage.’ The story's climax, which sees Mama give the quilts to Maggie, rather than Dee, is viewed as representative of the quilts’ functionality. Dee views the quilts as worthy of museum display ("Maggie can't appreciate these quilts!...She'd probably be backward enough to put them to everyday use."), while Maggie treats them as household items ("I been saving 'em for long enough with nobody using 'em. I hope [ Maggie puts them to 'everyday use']!"). Both Mama and Maggie recognize that the quilt is meant for ‘everyday use’, as practiced by their ancestors.

== Reception ==
In critical readings the largest trend around the story has been to criticize Dee and the way she goes about reasserting her personal culture. Matthew Mullins argues in his essay, "Antagonized by the Text, Or, It Takes Two to Read Alice Walker’s 'Everyday Use' however, that this perspective isn’t necessarily fair. In reading and teaching the text, he found the character Dee was universally a disliked character, saying that in an epiphany he found in his defense of Dee rather a pitying attitude and concluding that "it was impossible to see how anyone could truly 'like' Dee". This, however, he goes on to point out as not being a direct result of Dee's actions alone, but rather the framing of her actions in the story. He argues that the text itself is what antagonizes the reader to grow this dislike of Dee: "The first-person narrative voice, the fact that Mrs. Johnson [Mama] is both narrator and character, has an immediate and forceful effect upon our perception of Dee." Mullins backs this up by quoting another scholar, Wayne Booth, who said in his work The Rhetoric of Fiction, "No narrator ... is simply convincing: he is convincingly decent or mean, brilliant or stupid, informed, intelligent, or muddled. ... we usually find our emotional and intellectual reactions to him as a character affects our reactions to the events he relates." Mullins points out that if Dee herself, or even Maggie, were the narrators of the story, we would come away with a completely different perspective on probably all of the characters. "The text actively prevents us from identifying with Dee," and this perspective has shaped the scholarly resources on this text since it came out.

Joe Sarnowski, in his article "Destroying to Save: Idealism and Pragmatism in Alice Walker's 'Everyday Use'", also points out this discrepancy but taking it one step further, arguing that even though it would be naïve to claim Dee does not have faults, she, "more than any other character in the story, identifies and pursues corrective measures against the oppression of African-American society and culture." Her fault, Sarnowski says, is in not realizing how idealism and pragmatism are "intertwined" and how "privileging one undermines both".

In "Quilt as a Metaphor in 'Everyday Use'" by Elaine Showalter, Mama explains that because Maggie can recreate the quilts made by her mother and grandmother, that she is the one that understands the culture and will keep it alive.

== Publication details ==
- Walker, Alice (April 1973). "Everyday Use". Harper's Magazine. Harper's Magazine Foundation.
