= Pratibha Parmar =

British filmmaker

- Born: Nairobi, Kenya
- Education: University of Birmingham
- Occupations: Writer and filmmaker
- Notable work: Alice Walker: Beauty in Truth (2014); My Name Is Andrea (2022)
- Website: pratibhaparmar.com

Pratibha Parmar is a British writer and filmmaker. She makes feminist documentaries such as Alice Walker: Beauty in Truth (2014) and My Name Is Andrea (2022).

== Early life and education ==
Parmar was born in Nairobi, Kenya, to Indian parents; when she was 11 years old her family moved to the United Kingdom. She received a B.A. degree from Bradford University and attended Birmingham University for postgraduate education. Parmar's feminism was influenced by writers such as Angela Davis, June Jordan, Cherríe Moraga, Barbara Smith, Alice Walker, Audre Lorde, and Gloria Anzaldúa.

== Career ==
In her 1991 film Khush, Parmar examined the world of South Asian lesbians and gay men in the United Kingdom and India, using a mix of documentary footage and dramatized scenes.

The documentary Alice Walker: Beauty in Truth (2014) is about the life of author and activist Alice Walker, whom Parmar met in 1991 via June Jordan and Angela Davis. Walker and Parmar also collaborated on Warrior Marks, a documentary about female genital mutilation. They then released a book, also entitled Warrior Marks (1993).

In 2022, Parmar released her documentary My Name is Andrea, about feminist writer Andrea Dworkin.

Parmar has also made music videos for Morcheeba, Tori Amos, and Midge Ure.

== Awards and recognition ==
- 1993: Frameline Award
- 1995: Trikone Pink Peacock Award
- 2016: BBC's 100 Women

=== Khush ===
- 1991: Frameline Film Festival Audience Award for Best Documentary Short
- 1992: Créteil International Women's Film Festival Public Prize for Best Foreign Film

== Selected works ==
=== Film ===
- Khush (1991)
- A Place of Rage (1991)
- Nina's Heavenly Delights (2006)
- Alice Walker: Beauty in Truth (2014)
- My Name is Andrea (2022)

=== Books ===
- Walker, Alice; Parmar, Pratibha (1993). Warrior Marks: Female Genital Mutilation and the Sexual Blinding of Women. New York: Harcourt Brace. ISBN 978-0-15-100061-6.
- Gever, Martha; Parmar, Pratibha; Greyson, John, eds. (1993). Queer Looks: An Anthology of Writings about Lesbian and Gay Media. Hoboken: Routledge. ISBN 978-0-415-90742-2.

=== Articles and book chapters ===
- Amos, Valerie; Parmar, Pratibha (1984). "Challenging Imperial Feminism". Feminist Review (17). doi:10.2307/1395006.
- Blackman, Inge; McIntosh, Mary; O'Sullivan, Sue; Parmar, Pratibha; Read, Alison (March 1990). "Perverse Politics". Feminist Review. 34 (1). doi:10.1057/fr.1990.1.
- Parmar, Pratibha (2008). "Pocket Sized Venus". In Volcano, Del LaGrace; Dahl, Ulrika (eds.). Femmes of Power: Exploding Queer Femininities. London: Serpent's Tail. ISBN 978-1-84668-664-1.

== See also ==
- List of female film and television directors
- List of lesbian filmmakers
- List of LGBTQ-related films directed by women
