= Meridian (novel) =

Novel by Alice Walker

- First edition
- Author: Alice Walker
- Language: English
- Publisher: Harcourt Brace Jovanovich
- Publication date: May 1976
- Publication place: United States
- Media type: Print
- Pages: 228
- ISBN: 0-15-159265-9

Meridian is a 1976 novel by Alice Walker. It has been described as Walker's "meditation on the modern civil rights movement." Meridian is about Meridian Hill, a young black woman in the late 1960s who is attending college as she embraces the civil rights movement at a time when the movement becomes violent. The story follows her life into the 1970s through a relationship that ultimately fails, and her continued efforts to support the movement.

== Plot summary ==
Set in the 1960s and 1970s, Meridian centers on Meridian Hill, a student at the fictitious Saxon College, who becomes active in the Civil Rights Movement. She becomes romantically involved with another activist, Truman Held. They have a turbulent on-and-off relationship, during which she becomes pregnant by him.

After Meridian has an abortion, Truman becomes far more attached to her and longs for them to start a life together. Later, Truman becomes involved with a Jewish woman, Lynne Rabinowitz, who is also active in the Civil Rights struggle, though perhaps for the wrong reasons.

As time passes, Truman attempts unsuccessfully, to achieve personal and financial success while Meridian continues to stay involved in the movement and fight for issues she deeply believes in.

== Themes and critiques ==
Walker wrote the novel at a time when many young black people were shifting away from supporting the practice of nonviolence and civil disobedience that had characterized the early years of the movement and had begun to take on more militant and extreme positions thereby alienating some supporters. Several literary critics believe that the novel is a critique of the Civil Rights Movement from that period. They interpreted Walker's work as suggesting that the revolution never addressed the suffering of women. Rather it perpetuated destructive and often chauvinistic values.

Some critics thought that Walker used Meridian to showcase her womanist, as opposed to feminist attitudes. A strong believer in the inherent power of the woman, Walker depicts her title character as an innately tough and resolute person, though not one without problems. Walker argues that personal struggles are an unavoidable part of life. She believes this is how individuals overcome obstacles and ultimately define their characters. Meridian features earlier examples of strong female role models.

=== Disagreements in the civil rights movement ===
Throughout Meridian, Walker examines how Meridian, Anne-Marion, and other characters in the Civil Rights Movement have differing ideas of how to proceed for racial justice. Unlike her friend Anne-Marion, Meridian is not ready to become fully radicalized. Throughout the book Meridian risked her life to affirm the principle of integration, for it had already been established as law, rather than give up the practice of non violence. Toward the end of the novel, Meridian continues to risk her health and her own happiness to continue working in grassroots activism, long after the Civil Rights Movement, torn apart by differing ideas within the movement regarding the practice of non-violence, is declared over.

=== Motherhood ===
In Alice Walker's "Meridian", the theme of motherhood is very prevalent but is not highlighted in the traditional way. Meridian who becomes a mother really young has an experience with motherhood most would frown upon. In most cases mothers decide to stick with the child they birthed because that is what most people do but Meridian chose the opposite. Meridian does not take the traditional route of motherhood but instead she defies society rules and creates a life suitable for herself. She decides to give up her son to follow her desires of going to college and being a writer. In the book, the examples of motherhood around Meridian were very "heroic." However, this "heroism" was not out of strength it was out of necessity and Meridian sought to change that, with the action of giving up her child to pursue her dreams.

Upon getting pregnant out of wedlock in Meridian's teenage years she is expelled from school and forced to give up her education. Meridian after a few years decides to give up her son Eddie Jr because she realizes that her son had prevented her from achieving her dreams and ambitions. Meridian chose to give up her son because she did not want to repeat what her mother had done; her mother too had given up her teaching career upon having children. There are multiple other examples of the difficulties of motherhood in the book. Meridian's friend Nelda is also forced to give up her education upon getting pregnant. Another example was a thirteen-year-old girl who killed her child and was in prison for that crime. While visiting the girl Meridian's sympathies are not with the girl's murdered child but rather her sympathies are with the young mother who killed her child. These girls had dreams which became paralyzed by their teenage pregnancies.

Walker suggests in the novel that motherhood is not for all women despite society's expectations. The main character Meridian goes against the norms of society; she gives up her son Eddie Jr for adoption to pursue her education and becomes an activist in the civil rights movement.

=== Freedom Summer ===
After the monumental efforts of many to achieve the Civil Rights Act of 1964, the Civil Rights Movement continued through the 1960s and 1970s through the organization of a new generation of young activists. The Student Nonviolent Coordinating Committee (SNCC) organized student sit-ins at segregated lunch counters and what became known as Freedom Summer—an effort to register black voters in Mississippi. Over a thousand volunteers, mostly white college students from northern cities, joined with Mississippians to go door to door. In addition, the SNCC also set up "Freedom Schools", aimed at educating black children. Volunteers were met with resistance and violence, most notably the fates of three men: two Jewish volunteers from NY, Michael Schwerner and Andrew Goodman and a local black man, James Chaney. Chaney, Schwerner, and Goodman were missing for over a month until their bodies were found murdered and buried in early August 1964. Walker sets the novel during this time with her three main characters, Meridian, Truman, and Lynne, getting involved in this movement and meeting each other through it.
