= Adé: A Love Story =

2013 novel by Rebecca Walker

- First edition cover
- Author: Rebecca Walker
- Language: English
- Publisher: New Harvest/Houghton Mifflin Harcourt
- Publication date: 2013
- Publication place: United States
- Pages: 112
- ISBN: 9780544149229

Adé: A Love Story is the debut novel of writer Rebecca Walker, first published by Houghton Mifflin Harcourt in 2013.

== Plot ==
A recent Yale grad decides to take a multi-country trip across Africa with her friend Miriam. In Egypt and subsequent countries she visits, she feels at ease as her half-black, half-white Jewish heritage allows her to blend into crowds in a way that her white friend Miriam cannot. On Lamu Island she meets Adé, a young Muslim man she immediately feels connected to. When Miriam tries to continue their trip, she decides to stay with Adé. Adé gives the narrator the name Farida and the two decide to marry.

Adé introduces Farida to his relatives and she is slowly vetted over a few months. When his family finally approves of her, Adé's imam tells him he must go to America to ask permission to marry her from her parents. The two travel to Nairobi to obtain a passport for Adé, but on the bus ride there Farida is assaulted by a soldier when she tries to stop him from stealing from the other passengers. In Nairobi she also witnesses the murder of a young boy by soldiers. With financial help from her parents, Farida and Adé are able to bribe officials into providing him with a passport. However, the day they pick it up Farida becomes extremely ill with both malaria and meningitis. She needs to travel back to America to receive proper treatment but Saddam Hussein's invasion of Kuwait means that air travel is restricted. Her parents manage to get her a ride on a plane but Adé is unable to travel with her.

Realizing that she has romanticized Africa and that she is incapable of truly making a life with Adé, she leaves and, despite promising to come back, never sees him again.

== Film adaptation ==
In March 2014, it was announced that the film rights had been optioned, with Madonna directing. As of June 2017, Madonna was in pre-production on an unrelated film and Rebecca Walker removed any reference to Madonna's involvement with a screen adaption of Adé from her Twitter account.
