= The Temple of My Familiar =

1989 novel by Alice Walker

- First edition
- Author: Alice Walker
- Publisher: Harcourt
- Publication date: 1989
- Pages: 416 pp.
- ISBN: 978-0-15-188533-6
- OCLC: 18781325

The Temple of My Familiar is a 1989 novel by Alice Walker. It is an ambitious and multi-narrative novel containing the interleaved stories of Arveyda, a musician in search of his past; Carlotta, his Latin American wife who lives in exile from hers; Suwelo, a black professor of American History who realizes that his generation of men have failed women; Fanny, his ex-wife about to meet her father for the first time; and Lissie, a vibrant creature with a thousand pasts.

The two lead characters from Alice Walker's The Color Purple, Celie and Shug, act as minor supporting characters in this novel.
