= Warrior Marks =

1993 book by Alice Walker and Pratibha Parmar

- First caption
- Author: Alice Walker; Pratibha Parmar
- Subject: Female genital mutilation
- Publisher: Harcourt Brace
- Publication date: 1993
- Pages: 373 pp.
- ISBN: 978-0-15-100061-6
- OCLC: 29162963

Warrior Marks: Female Genital Mutilation and the Sexual Blinding of Women is a 1993 book by Alice Walker with Pratibha Parmar, who made an award-winning documentary of the same name. Following on from her 1992 novel Possessing the Secret of Joy, Walker undertakes a journey to parts of Africa where clitoridectomy is still practised. Warrior Marks is a harrowing work as Walker interviews women who have had the operation done and finally interviews a woman—circumcised herself—who performs the operation.
