= Rebecca Walker =

American writer (born 1969)

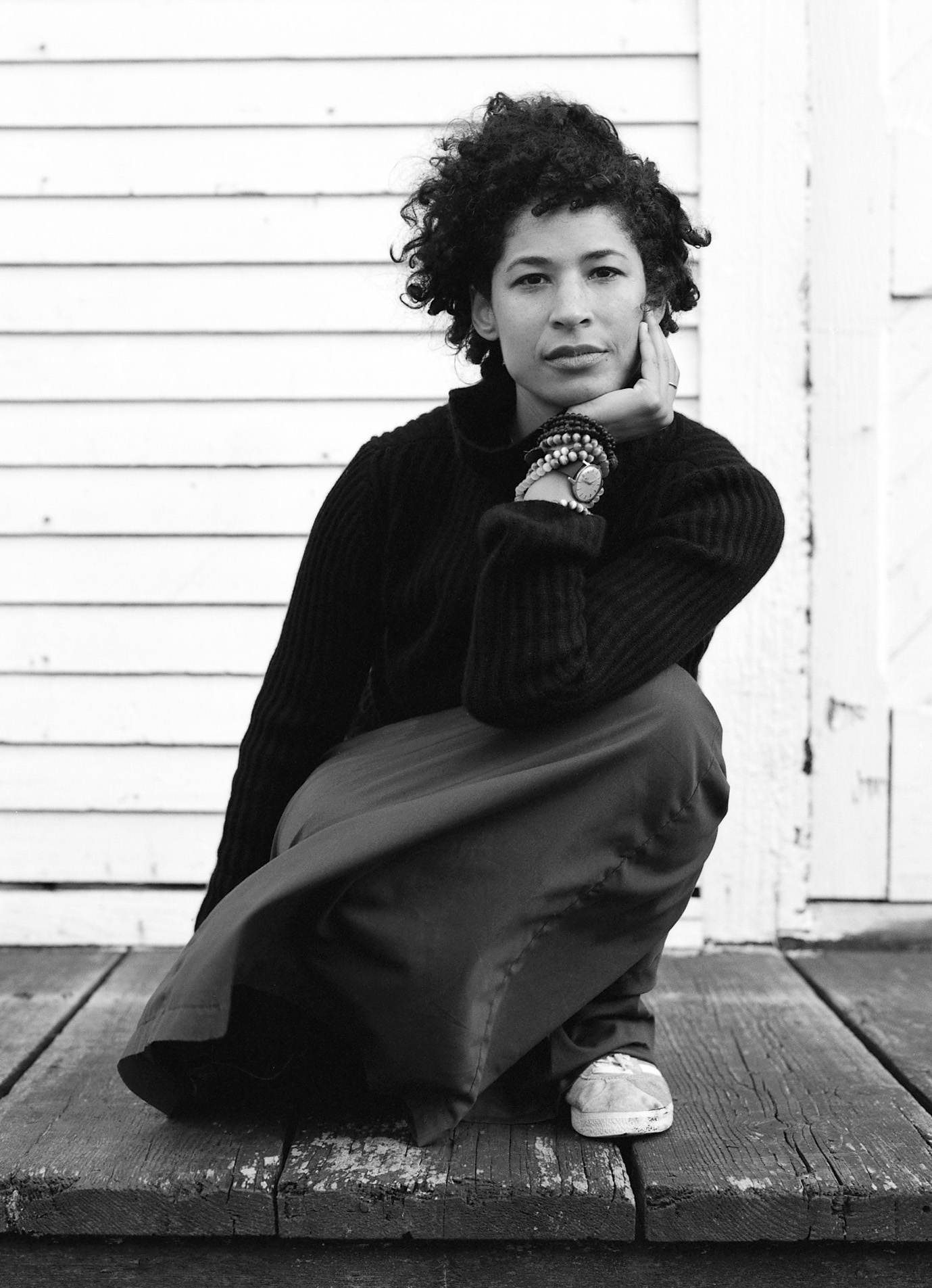
- Press photo, 2003
- Born: Rebecca Leventhal; November 17, 1969 (age 56); Jackson, Mississippi, U.S.
- Education: Yale University
- Occupations: Writer, feminist
- Spouse: Rachel M. Harper
- Children: 1
- Parent(s): Alice Walker; Melvyn Leventhal
- Website: www.rebeccawalker.com

Rebecca Walker (born Rebecca Leventhal; November 17, 1969) is an American writer, feminist, and activist. Walker has been regarded as one of the prominent voices of Third Wave Feminism, and the coiner of the term "third wave", since publishing a 1992 article on feminism in Ms. magazine called "Becoming the Third Wave", in which she proclaimed: "I am the Third Wave."

Walker's writing, teaching, and speeches focus on race, gender, politics, power, and culture. In her activism work, she helped co-found the Third Wave Fund that morphed into the Third Wave Foundation, an organization that supports young women of color, queer, intersex, and trans individuals by providing tools and resources they need to be leaders in their communities through activism and philanthropy.

Walker does extensive writing and speaking about gender, racial, economic, and social justice at universities around the United States and internationally.

In 1994, Time named Walker as one of the 50 future leaders of America. Her work has appeared in publications including The Washington Post, The Huffington Post, Salon, Glamour, and Essence and has been featured on CNN and MTV.

== Early life ==
Born Rebecca Leventhal in 1969 in Jackson, Mississippi, she is the daughter of Alice Walker, an African-American writer whose work includes The Color Purple, and Melvyn R. Leventhal, a Jewish American civil rights lawyer. Her parents married in New York before going to Mississippi to work in civil rights. After her parents divorced in 1976, Walker spent her childhood alternating every two years between her father's home in the largely Jewish Riverdale section of the Bronx in New York City and her mother's largely African-American environment in San Francisco. Walker attended The Urban School of San Francisco.

When she was 15, she decided to change her surname from Leventhal to Walker, her mother's surname. After high school, she studied at Yale University, where she graduated cum laude in 1992. Walker identifies as Jewish, White and Black; her 2000 memoir is titled Black, White, and Jewish: Autobiography of a Shifting Self.

== Activism ==
=== The Third Wave Fund ===
After graduating from Yale University, she and Shannon Liss (now Shannon Liss-Riordan) co-founded the Third Wave Fund, a non-profit organization aimed at encouraging young women to get involved in activism and leadership roles. The organization's initial mission, based on Walker's article, was to "fill a void in young women's leadership and to mobilize young people to become more involved socially and politically in their communities." In its first year, the organization initiated a campaign that registered more than 20,000 new voters across the United States. The organization now provides grants to individuals and projects that support young women. The fund was adapted as The Third Wave Foundation in 1997 and continues to support young activists. In the wake of the November 2016 presidential election in the United States, the organization received more than four times the normal number of requests for emergency grants.

=== Teaching ===
Walker views teaching as a way to give people the strength to speak the truth, to change perspectives, and to empower people with the ability to change the world. She lectures on writing memoirs, multi-generational feminism, diversity in the media, multi-racial identity, contemporary visual arts and emerging cultures.

== Speaking ==
Walker concentrates on speaking about multicultural identity (including her own), enlightened masculinity, and inter-generational and third-wave feminism at high schools, universities and conferences around the world. She has spoken at Harvard, Exeter, Head Royce, Oberlin, Smith, MIT, Xavier, Stanford, and Louisiana State University. She has also addressed organizations and corporations such as The National Council of Teachers of English, the Walker Art Center, the American Association of University Women, the National Women's Studies Association, Out and Equal, the National Organization for Women, and Hewitt Associates. In the United States, she has been featured on various popular media outlets such as Good Morning America, The Oprah Winfrey Show, and Charlie Rose.

== Books and writing ==
=== Major works ===
Walker's first major work was the book To be Real: Telling the Truth and Changing the Face of Feminism (1996), which consisted of articles that she compiled and edited. The book reevaluated the feminist movement of the time. According Michelle Jensen writing for The Nation, it is one of the "central texts" of Third Wave Feminism. As a collection of "personal testimonies", this work shows how third-wave activists use personal narratives to describe their experiences with social and gender injustice. Contributors include feminist writers such as bell hooks and Naomi Wolf. It has been used as a teaching text.

In 2001, Walker published Black, White and Jewish: Autobiography of a Shifting Self, a memoir examining her childhood and adolescence across the racial, religious, and cultural worlds of her divorced parents. Reviewing the book in The Washington Post, Maggie Jones discussed Walker's movement between Black and Jewish communities and the ways those experiences informed her evolving understanding of identity.

Walker was the editor for What Makes a Man: 22 Writers Imagine the Future, a collection of essays examining masculinity, gender expectations, and alternative conceptions of manhood. The impetus for the project came from Walker considering the future for her son, who was 11 at the time.

Her second memoir, Baby Love: Choosing Motherhood After a Lifetime of Ambivalence (2007), examines pregnancy, motherhood, family relationships, independence, and changing ideas about parenting. Reviews commented on the book as a statement about Walker's relationship with her then-estranged mother. Walker also wrote about how she felt "different kinds of love" for her two different children, one of whom is adopted. While she faced criticism from many adoptive parents, she was also praised by some commentators for her honest treatment of a personal and taboo topic.

Walker edited One Big Happy Family: 18 Writers Talk About Polyamory, Open Adoption, Mixed Marriage, Househusbandry, Single Motherhood, and Other Realities of Truly Modern Love (2009), an anthology examining changing family structures and domestic relationships. The collection addresses subjects including adoption, polyamory, marriage, parenting, and gender roles.

Her first novel, Adé: A Love Story, was published in 2013. It features a biracial college student, Farida, who falls in love with Adé, a black Kenyan man. The couple's plan to marry is interrupted when Farida gets malaria and the two must struggle through a civil war in Kenya. The novel was generally well received by critics and laypeople alike. A movie adaptation was proposed in 2014.

Walker edited Women Talk Money: Breaking the Taboo, a 2022 anthology examining women's relationships with money through experiences involving gender, race, class, work, family, and economic power.

== Personal life ==
Walker is bisexual. She dated neo-soul musician Meshell Ndegeocello, whose son she helped raise even after their relationship ended.

She has a son (b. 2004) with her former partner Choyin Rangdrol, a Buddhist teacher.

She is married to writer Rachel M. Harper.

Once estranged from her mother Alice Walker, she has reconciled with her, and the two have since appeared at literary events together.

== Selected Bibliography ==
- To Be Real: Telling the Truth and Changing the Face of Feminism (1996) (editor)
- Black, White and Jewish: Autobiography of a Shifting Self (2000)
- What Makes A Man: 22 Writers Imagine The Future (2004) (editor)
- Baby Love: Choosing Motherhood After a Lifetime of Ambivalence (2007)
- One Big Happy Family: 18 Writers Talk About Polyamory, Open Adoption, Mixed Marriage, Househusbandry, Single Motherhood, and Other Realities of Truly Modern Love (2009) (editor)
- Black Cool: One Thousand Streams of Blackness (Soft Skull Press, February 2012) (editor)
- Adé: A Love Story (2013), (novel)
- Women Talk Money: Breaking the Taboo (2022) (editor)

== Film ==
In the 1998 film Primary Colors, a roman à clef about Bill Clinton's 1992 presidential campaign, Walker played the character March.

In March 2014, the film rights for her novel Adé: A Love Story (2013) were reported to have been optioned, with Madonna to serve as director.

== Awards ==
- Women of Distinction Award from the American Association of University Women,
- "Feminist of the Year" award from the Fund for the Feminist Majority,
- "Paz y Justicia" award from the Vanguard Public Foundation,
- "Intrepid Award" from the National Organization for Women,
- "Champion of Choice" award from the California Abortion Rights Action League,
- "Women Who Could Be President Award" from the League of Women Voters.

Walker has also received an honorary Doctorate from the North Carolina School of the Arts.

Walker is featured in The Advocate′s "Forty Under 40" issue of June/July 2009 as one of the most influential "out" media professionals.

In 2016, she was selected as one of BBC's 100 Women.

== See also ==
- Alice Walker
- Anita Hill
- Black feminism
- Feminism
- Intersectionality
- Third-wave feminism
