= The Third Life of Grange Copeland =

1970 novel by Alice Walker

- First edition
- Author: Alice Walker
- Cover artist: Hal Siegal
- Publisher: Harcourt Brace Jovanovich
- Publication date: 1970
- Pages: 247 pp.
- ISBN: 978-0-15-189905-0
- OCLC: 188256

The Third Life of Grange Copeland is the debut novel of American author Alice Walker. Published in 1970, it is set in rural Georgia. It tells the story of Grange, his wife, their son Brownfield, and granddaughter Ruth.

== Characters ==
- Grange- book focuses on his journey through life, starting at a very low point both morally and economically, to the end where he is economically stable and at a moral high point.
- Margaret- wife of Grange
- Star- baby son of Margaret. (Margaret's son, but not Grange's; the result of an extramarital affair)
- Brownfield- son of Margaret and Grange, marries Mem.
- Mr.Shipley- owner of the field that Grange works on.
- Josie- owner of the Dew Drop Inn, lover of both Grange and Brownfield, ends up marrying Grange.
- Mem- illegitimate daughter of a northern preacher, also Josie's niece, ends up married to Brownfield.
- Ruth- youngest daughter of Brownfield and Mem.
- Hatchet murderer- meets Brownfield in prison and helps him plan revenge against Grange
- Northern Preacher- absentee father of Mem, and later takes Daphne and Ornette up north with him.
- Daphne- oldest daughter of Brownfield and Mem
- Ornette- second daughter of Brownfield and Mem

== Plot summary ==
As a poor sharecropper, Grange is virtually a slave; in cotton-era Baker County, Georgia, the more he works, the more money he ends up owing to the man who owns the fields he works and the house he lives in. Eventually life becomes too much for him and he runs away from his debts to start a new life up North, leaving his family.

After declining a loan from a white landowner which he knows he can't pay back, Brownfield begins to head North on foot to follow in his father's footsteps. Brownfield is led to a woman named Josie who owns and operates a lounge/brothel called the Dew Drop Inn (in some printings, the Dewey Inn). Brownfield winds up sharing a bed with Josie, her daughter Lorene, and Josie's deceased sister's daughter Mem. Brownfield takes a liking to Mem and eventually marries her under the disapproving Josie's nose.

Brownfield beats and eventually kills Meme (sometimes printed as "Mem") and is jailed for an arbitrary seven years. Grange finds the North unfulfilling and returns to Baker County, which is the only place he knows of as home.

== Analysis ==
Walker says,"it was an incredibly difficult novel to write, for I had to look at, and name, and speak up about violence among black people in the black community at the same time that black people (and some whites)--including me and my family were enduring massive psychological and physical violence from white supremacists in the southern states, particularly Mississippi."

She further states that the incident in the novel involving the murder of a woman and mother by her husband and the father of her children is based on a real case in her hometown of Eatonton, Georgia.
