= Frank R. Parker =

American lawyer

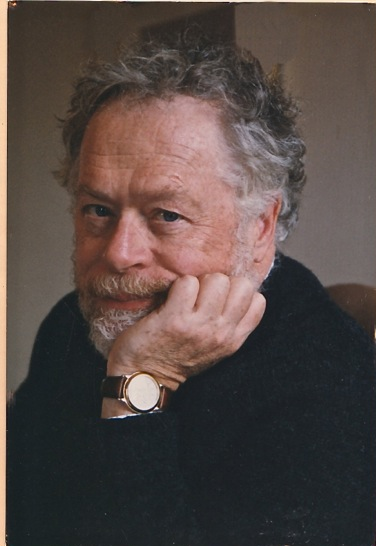
Frank R. Parker, civil rights lawyer and voting rights activist (1996 photo)

Frank Ruff Parker III (May 11, 1940 – July 10, 1997) was an American civil rights lawyer and voting rights activist. Beginning in 1981, while working for The Lawyers' Committee for Civil Rights Under Law, he directed the Voting Rights Project, where he helped secure from the United States Congress a 25-year extension of the Voting Rights Act of 1965. During his 12 years as Director of the Voting Rights Project, he launched a program to enforce the guarantees of the Voting Rights Act on a nationwide level through litigation and public education, and was a leader in the five-year struggle to enact the National Voter Registration Act of 1993. In 1990, he authored an award-winning book on the impact of the Voting Rights Act in Mississippi, Black Votes Count: Political Empowerment in Mississippi After 1965.

== Early career ==
Frank Parker began his legal career as a staff attorney in the Office of General Counsel of the United States Commission on Civil Rights from 1966 to 1968. He moved to Jackson, Mississippi, in 1968, working as a staff attorney with the Jackson office of the Lawyers' Committee for Civil Rights Under Law. He became chief counsel in 1976. He litigated dozens of voting rights and employment discrimination cases in the state of Mississippi.

Parker served as chief counsel or co-counsel in several landmark cases, including, but not limited to, Brooks v. Winter, which resulted in the creation of a majority Black court-ordered congressional district and the election in 1986 of Mike Espy, the first Black member of Congress from Mississippi since Reconstruction; and Connor v. Finch, which resulted in four Black legislators being elected to the Mississippi Legislature in Hinds County in 1975 and a total of 17 Black legislators elected statewide from single member districts in 1979.

In 1978 Parker succeeded Mel Leventhal as counsel for plaintiffs in Loewen et al. v. Turnipseed et al., challenging Mississippi's denial of Mississippi: Conflict and Change, a textbook in Mississippi history intended for use in a required ninth-grade course. Under his leadership, the case was won, a victory that the American Library Association includes among a dozen decisions that underlie Americans' right to read.

When the 1979 Easter flood damaged the campus of Jackson Academy, the racially segregated private school resumed classes in temporary facilities provided by local churches. Jackson Academy was forced to vacate the churches after Parker filed a lawsuit to force the IRS to remove the churches' tax exempt status since the churches were aiding a segregation academy. Parker recalled that he received so many threats of violence that he had to leave Mississippi for several weeks.

Parker served as an associate professor of political science at Tougaloo College from 1975 to 1976. He returned to Washington, D.C., in 1981, working as voting rights director for the Lawyers' Committee for Civil Rights Under Law until 1993. Mr. Parker was a leader in the effort to gain passage of the Voter Registration Act of 1993, the "motor-voter" law. Parker taught at the District of Columbia School of Law from 1993 to 1995. He taught at American University in 1996 and then accepted an appointment as a visiting professor at Washington and Lee University in Lexington, Virginia, teaching constitutional law. At the time of his death on July 10, 1997, Parker had accepted an appointment as a visiting law professor at the University of Pittsburgh.

== Awards ==
Parker's book Black Votes Count received numerous awards in 1991, including the Silver Gavel Award from the American Bar Association, the Ralph J. Bunche Award from the American Political Science Association, the V. O. Key Award from the Southern Political Science Association, the McLemore Prize from the Mississippi Historical Society, and the Gustavus Myers Center for the Study of Human Rights in the United States Outstanding Book Award. Parker was rewarded with an Honorary Black Man of the Year Award in 1970, the Martin Luther King-John F. Kennedy Award from the Mississippi Council on Human Relations in 1974 and the Jackson Branch NAACP Freedom Award in 1975.

== Personal life and education ==
Frank Parker was born May 11, 1940, in Mount Pleasant, Pennsylvania, to Marjorie LeClair Parker and Frank R. Parker Jr. He attended public schools in Steubenville, Ohio, and received his B.A. from Oberlin College. After studies at Oxford University, Parker received an Erwin N. Griswold Scholarship to Harvard Law School, where he obtained his L.L.B. degree in 1966. Married three times, to Virginia Foster Durr, Carolyn Parker, and Ann Burlock Lawver, Parker had four children: Barbara Parker Thornton, Stephanie Parker Weaver, Kevin Parker, and Ian Parker.

Frank Parker died July 10, 1997, from complications due to a ruptured aortic aneurysm.
