= My Name Is Andrea =

2022 documentary film

My Name is Andrea
- Poster
- Directed by: Pratibha Parmar
- Music by: Nitin Sawhney
- Release date: 2022
- Running time: 91 minutes
- Language: English

My Name is Andrea is a 2022 British documentary film by Pratibha Parmar about the second-wave feminist and public figure Andrea Dworkin. It tells the story of Dworkin's life through a hybrid mix of archival footage and dramatic performances by five different actresses: Amandla Stenberg, Soko, Andrea Riseborough, Ashley Judd, and Christine Lahti. The film premiered at the Tribeca Film Festival and was generally praised by critics.

== Synopsis ==
My Name is Andrea tells the story of Andrea Dworkin's life through a mixture of archive footage and dramatic performances by five different actresses, representing her at different ages: Amandla Stenberg and Soko play a young Dworkin, interested in poetry and politics; Andrea Riseborough is the wife in Amsterdam; Ashley Judd and Christine Lahti play the older Dworkin as she became a public figure. Events in Dworkin's life are depicted such as her sexual assault by two male doctors at the New York Women's House of Detention, her friendship with Allen Ginsberg, her marriage and abusive relationship in Amsterdam, her focus on writing, her many public appearances including one at the Cambridge Union, her collaboration with Catharine A. MacKinnon, her 1999 rape in Paris and her long loving relationship with John Stoltenberg. The archive footage includes home video of Dworkin with her family as a child and appearances on The Phil Donahue Show and After Dark. There are also references to contemporary feminist issues such as the murders of Sarah Everard and Sabina Nessa.

== Production ==
Pratibha Parmar told Alexandra Juhasz in Ms. magazine that it took her eight years to make the documentary. Her first step was to write a screenplay based entirely on Andrea Dworkin's own words. The executive producers included Gloria Steinem and the music was arranged by Nitin Sawhney.

== Release ==
The film premiered in June 2022 at the Tribeca Film Festival in the USA and at Sheffield DocFest in the UK.

== Critical response ==
Critics generally praised the hybrid documentary style which Parmar used. Richard Brody writing in The New Yorker called the film "deeply moving" and The London Magazine found the film "crafted, emotive, and powerful". The IndieWire review also praised aspects of the films, whilst criticizing its "dogged insistence on sugarcoating Dworkin’s legacy".
