= Am I Blue? (essay) =

"Am I Blue?" is an autobiographical essay written by Alice Walker in 1986. It was first published in her non-fiction collection, Living By the Word: Selected Writings 1973-1987.

The essay recounts Walker's relationship with a horse named Blue who lives in a neighbouring paddock and in whom she comes to see elements of her life and ancestry reflected back to her.

The essay takes its title from a 1929 song composed by Harry Akst and Grant Clarke.

== Synopsis ==
The essay begins by describing how Walker and her unnamed partner rented a 'small house in the country' next to which is a meadow containing a white stallion named Blue. Walker befriends Blue, learning that he is owned by a 'man who lived in another town' and is being 'boarded out' in the field. Walker senses Blue's loneliness, boredom and silence, and is prompted to reflect on the history of Slavery in the United States, the treatment of Native Americans in the United States and American men who marry non-English-speaking women from East Asia.

The arrival of a mare in the field produces a period of happiness for Blue but this is shortly followed by a period of acute depression when she is removed soon afterwards and Walker learns that she was only there for breeding purposes. Walker is again reminded of the history of slavery. Blue is described as being reduced to having 'the look of a beast'. The essay concludes with Walker reflecting on the realities behind the meat and dairy industry and spitting out the meat she was eating.

== Themes ==
Walker's essay, in comparing the treatment of animals with the history of slavery, invokes what Marjory Spiegel has called the 'dreaded comparison', a contenious and controversial approach to understanding animal rights.

Walker's essay has received attention from scholars working within the fields of African-American literature, ecocriticism and animal studies.

== Reception ==
In 1994, the essay was banned by the California State Board of Education for its perceived anti-meat sentiment. After a public backlash, the ban was retracted.

The animal rights organization People for the Ethical Treatment of Animals have used extracts and excerpts from the essay in campaign materials.

In 2019, researchers at the University of Wrocław used the essay in a series of experiments to examine whether literature can influence concern about animal welfare. A subsequent similar study was later conducted in the United States.
