= Melvyn R. Leventhal =

American lawyer, civil rights organizer

- Born: March 18, 1943 (age 83); Brooklyn, New York City, U.S.
- Education: Washington Square College; New York University School of Law
- Occupation: Attorney

Melvyn Rosenman Leventhal (born March 18, 1943) is an American attorney known for his work as a community organizer and lawyer in the 1960s–70s Civil Rights Movement. From 1969 to 1974 he served as the Lead Counsel in Mississippi for the NAACP Legal Defense & Educational Fund, Inc. and then, from 1974 to 1978, as a staff attorney in LDF's offices in New York.

== Early life and education ==
Born and raised in Brooklyn, New York City, Leventhal attended a yeshiva elementary school and Brooklyn Technical High School. He received his undergraduate degree from New York University's Washington Square College in 1964, and then a J.D. from New York University School of Law in 1967.

In Leventhal's formative years he was greatly influenced by Judaism's emphasis on community service, by the Montgomery Bus Boycott of 1955, and by the career of Jackie Robinson", the first African American to integrate a major league baseball team.

== Early career and marriage ==
As a young lawyer, Leventhal worked in Mississippi for the NAACP Legal Defense Fund (“LDF”). From this work he formed the first interracial law partnership in the state's history, with Reuben V. Anderson, Fred L. Banks Jr., and John A. Nichols. Anderson and Banks later became the first two African-American justices of the Mississippi Supreme Court.

Through his work, Leventhal met the writer Alice Walker. She came to trust and admire him due to his willingness to endanger his own social status and well-being by standing up to bigotry. On March 17, 1967, Leventhal and Walker married in New York, in a civil ceremony performed by Family Court Judge Justine W. Polier. At that time, the interracial marriage was illegal in Walker's home state of Georgia.

When the couple moved to Mississippi in July 1967, they were the first legally married interracial couple in the state. Walker and Leventhal have one child, Rebecca Walker. They divorced in New York in 1977.

=== Career ===
During spring, summer and winter recesses from law school, Leventhal worked as a student volunteer at LDF's offices in Jackson, Mississippi, supervised by activist Marian Wright Edelman. He served as LDF's liaison to Martin Luther King, Jr., during the June 1966 Meredith March Against Fear from Memphis, Tennessee, to Jackson, Mississippi.

From 1969 to 1974, Leventhal served as LDF's lead counsel in Mississippi. He represented plaintiffs in approximately 75 lawsuits filed throughout the state to challenge segregation and discrimination in public schools, employment, public accommodations, housing and municipal services (e.g., street paving, street lighting and fire protection). He helped enforce provisions of federal civil rights legislation that had been passed in 1964, 1965 and 1968, as well as court rulings to end school segregation.

Leventhal and Walker moved back to New York in 1974. There he continued to work for LDF as a staff attorney, litigating cases brought in Mississippi and other states. His ten-year career at the LDF was highlighted by four landmark cases:

- Alexander v. Holmes County Board of Education, 396 U.S. 19 (1969), in which the Supreme Court of the United States ordered school districts to desegregate "at once" overturning its 1954-1955 decisions in Brown v Board of Education which permitted school districts to desegregate with "all deliberate speed."
- Norwood v. Harrison, 413 U.S. 455 (1973), in which the Supreme Court of the United States held unconstitutional state textbook assistance to private schools that discriminate on the basis of race.
- Hawkins v. Town of Shaw, 437 F.2d 1286 (5th Cir. 1971), affirmed on rehearing en banc, 461 F. 2d 1171 (5th Cir. 1972), in which the United States Court of Appeals for the Fifth Circuit upheld lawsuits challenging racial discrimination in the provision of municipal services.
- Loewen v Turnipseed, 488 F. Supp. 1138 (N.D. Miss. 1980), with co-counsel, Frank R. Parker, under which the court ordered Mississippi's Textbook Purchasing Board to approve, for use in a required 9th grade Mississippi history course, the new textbook Conflict & Change" which presented a balanced view of race relations in Mississippi.

Leventhal also testified before the U.S. Senate's Select Committee on Equal Educational Opportunity in 1970 on the progress of school desegregation in Mississippi.

== Later public service career ==
Between 1978-1979 Leventhal served as the Deputy Director of the Office for Civil Rights in the US Department of Health Education and Welfare, in Washington D.C. Between 1979 and 1984, he served as Assistant Attorney General of the State of New York, in-charge of the Consumer Frauds and Protection Bureau and then as the Deputy First Assistant Attorney General of New York and Chief of the Litigation Bureau.

Leventhal has argued two cases before the Supreme Court of the United States, Norwood v. Harrison, 413 U.S. 455 (1973, argued in 1972, as noted above) and Blum v. Stenson, 465 U.S. 886 (1984), argued in 1983.
