= Possessing the Secret of Joy =

1992 novel by Alice Walker

- First edition
- Author: Alice Walker
- Genre: Fiction
- Publisher: Harcourt Brace Jovanovich
- Publication date: 1992
- Pages: 286 pp.
- ISBN: 978-0-15-173152-7
- OCLC: 25373376

Possessing the Secret of Joy is a 1992 novel by Alice Walker.

== Plot summary ==
It tells the story of Tashi, an African woman and a minor character in Walker's earlier novel The Color Purple. Now in the US she comes from the Olinka, (Alice Walker's fictional West African tribe) where female genital mutilation is practiced. Tashi marries an American man named Adam then leaves the Olinka because of the war. Tashi chooses to go back to the Olinka to undergo circumcision because she is a woman torn between two cultures, Olinkan and Western. Instead of feeling free from not having the procedure done as a child, she feels bothered by it. She wants to honor her Olinkan roots and has the operation in her teen years, although it is usually performed on female children. Tashi later sees several psychiatrists because she goes crazy due to the trauma she has suffered before finding the strength to act. The novel is told in many different voices, which are the characters in the novel. The novel explores what it means to have one's gender culturally defined and emphasizes that, according to Walker, "Torture is not culture."

== Characters ==
Tashi "Evelyn" Johnson – The main protagonist of the novel. She is haunted by her experiences as a child and on the run from her memories, especially the act of female circumcision that she underwent as a young adult rather than a young child like other children following the tradition of her village. The novel delves into her struggles recuperating emotionally and physically from the circumcision as she is enveloped in revelations about the underlying meaning of her culture. Once she has the procedure done things go downhill pretty quickly and Tashi goes mad.

Adam Johnson – The son of Celie from The Color Purple, he is Tashi's lovingly supportive husband. Adam watches Tashi's downward spiral into darkness with the miserable frustration of being incapable of helping her. His intensely powerful insecurity and fear causes him to indulge in a merely comforting affair with his longtime friend, the French feminist, Lissete. As a result of their extramarital union, their son, Pierre is born. Adam is heartbroken as his affair pushes Tashi further away, and must face the consequences of his actions.

Benny Johnson – Tashi and Adam's adult son; Benny has an intellectual disability as a result of his brain being damaged during his birth, which was complicated because of Tashi's infibulation. Benny's limited abilities make Tashi increasingly depressed because she blames her circumcised vulva for Benny's agonizing journey from her womb. Benny is very curious about the world and is willing to study about it in order to keep up conversations with his parents.

Lisette – Adam's lover and mother of Pierre, Adam's second son.

Dura – Tashi's older sister that bled to death in childhood due to the ritual circumcision. Tashi comes to view Dura's death as a murder, and repeatedly emphasizes that Dura has been "screaming in her ears" since her death.

M'Lissa – Tsunga of the tribe into which M'Lissa was born. The tsunga performs circumcisions (e.g. excision and infibulation) on the girls of the tribe. M'Lissa performed the circumcision on Dura that caused her to bleed to death.

Carl Gustav Jung – Jung appears as the therapist of Tashi, the novel's protagonist. He is usually called "Mzee" but is identified by Alice Walker in the afterword.
