= Khush (film) =

1991 short film directed by Pratibha Parmar

Khush is a 1991 British short film directed by Pratibha Parmar. It portrays lesbians and gay men from India and other parts of Asia, discussing their coming out and their acceptance and embracing of their sexuality. Khush also discusses homosexuality in the Indian diaspora.

It includes interviews and has segments of dancing and artwork. In Urdu, "Khush" means "ecstatic pleasure". This is Parmar's seventh film. Gwendolyn Audrey Foster, the author of Women Film Directors: An International Bio-critical Dictionary, wrote that Khush was "one of [Parmar's] best-known lesbian-centered films."

The director stated that Khush was written as a "dialogue" involving South Asian LGBT diasporas. E. Ann Kaplan, author of Looking for the Other: Feminism, Film and the Imperial Gaze, stated that Khush "addresses the dual formation of colonialism as patriarchical and homophobic-a homophobia that uncannily found an echo within Indian culture itself".

== Content ==
The film uses the expository interview method where the subjects speak to a camera and the interviewer is not voiced. Parmar does not use narration in the interviews, so the subjects explain matters themselves.

The film includes documentary interviews with dramatized scenes. Parmar edited out the "male gaze" and instead portrays women watching a dancer. This "lesbian gaze" uses the sort of "film-within-film" method used by She Must be Seeing Things. She wrote about the process in Queer Looks.

== Release ==
The film won the "Best Documentary" of the 1991 Frameline Film and Video Festival in San Francisco, the "Public Prize" of the 1991 International Women's Film Festival in Madrid, the 1992 "Best Foreign Film" award at the Créteil International Women's Film Festival in Paris, and other awards.

The film was played at the Dobie Theatre Gay and Lesbian Film Festival.

It was aired on Channel Four in the United Kingdom and was one of the first LGBT-themed films to do so.
