= Alice Walker =

American author and activist (born 1944)

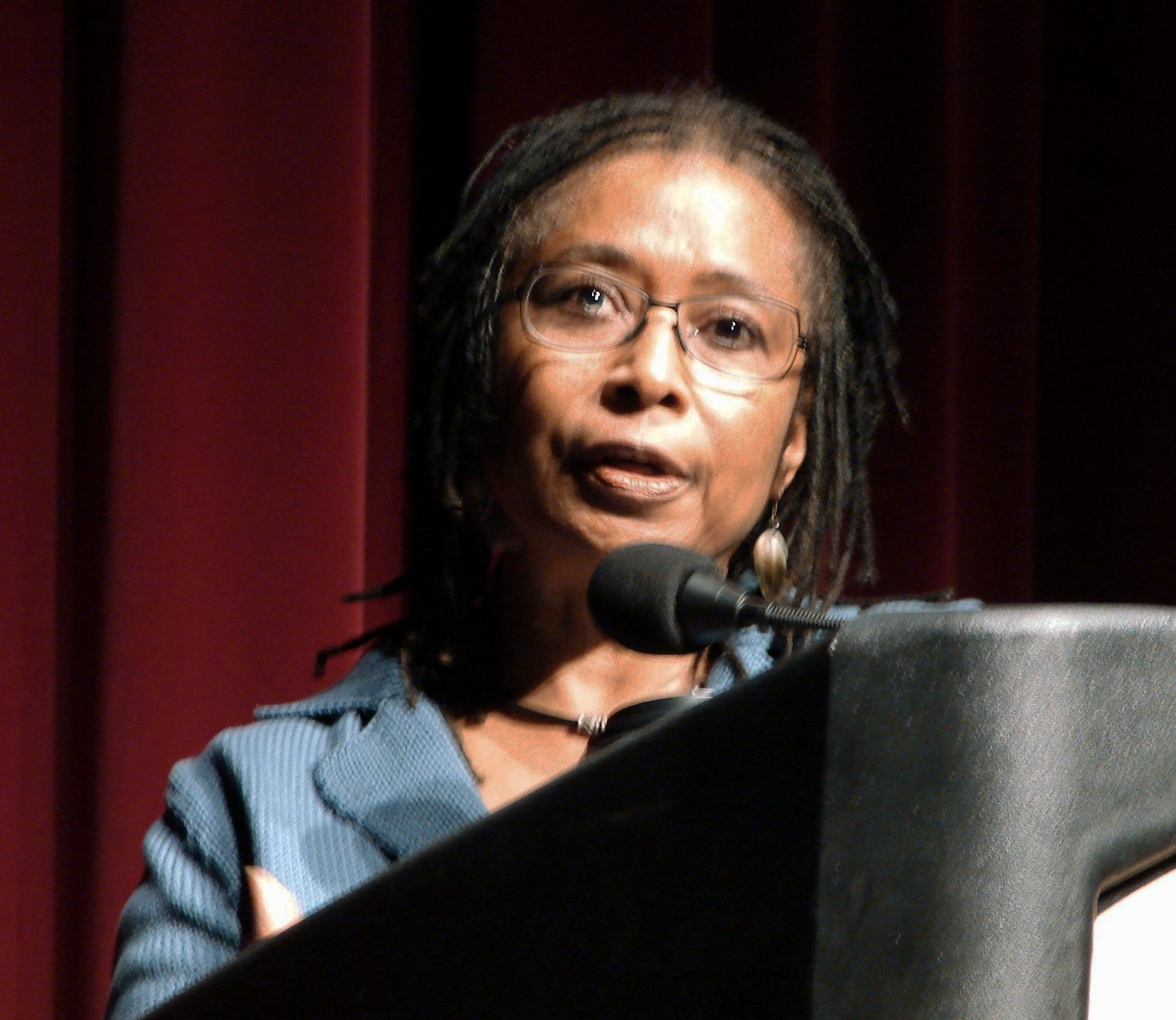
- Walker in 2007
- Born: Alice Malsenior Walker; February 9, 1944 (age 82); Eatonton, Georgia, U.S.
- Education: Spelman College; Sarah Lawrence College (BA)
- Occupations: Novelist; short story writer; poet; political activist
- Spouse: Melvyn R. Leventhal (m. 1967; div. 1976)
- Partner(s): Robert L. Allen; Tracy Chapman
- Children: Rebecca Walker
- Writing career
- Period: 1968–present
- Genre: African-American literature
- Notable work: The Color Purple
- Notable awards: Pulitzer Prize for Fiction (1983); National Book Award (1983)
- Alice Walker's voice from the BBC programme Desert Island Discs, May 19, 2013.
- Website: Official website

Alice Malsenior Tallulah-Kate Walker (born February 9, 1944) is an American novelist, short story writer, poet, and social activist. In 1982, she became the first African-American woman to win the Pulitzer Prize for Fiction, which she was awarded for her novel The Color Purple. Over the span of her career, Walker has published seventeen novels and short story collections, twelve non-fiction works, and collections of essays and poetry.

Walker, born in rural Georgia, overcame challenges such as childhood injury and segregation to become high school valedictorian and graduate from Sarah Lawrence College. She began her writing career with her first book of poetry, Once, and later wrote novels, including her best-known work, The Color Purple. As an activist, Walker participated in the Civil Rights Movement, advocated for women of color through the term "womanism," and has been involved in animal advocacy and pacifism. Additionally, she has taken a strong stance on the Israeli–Palestinian conflict, supporting the Boycott, Divestment and Sanctions campaign against Israel.

Walker has faced multiple accusations of antisemitism due to her praise for British conspiracy theorist David Icke and his works, which contain antisemitic conspiracy theories, along with criticisms of her own writings.

== Early life and education ==
Alice Malsenior Walker was born in Eatonton, Georgia, a rural farming town, to Willie Lee Walker and Minnie Tallulah Grant. Both of Walker's parents were sharecroppers, though her mother also worked as a seamstress to earn extra money. Walker, the youngest of eight children, was first enrolled in school when she was just four years old at East Putnam Consolidated.

As an eight-year-old, Walker sustained an injury to her right eye after one of her brothers fired a BB gun. Since her family did not have access to a car, Walker could not receive immediate medical attention, causing her to become permanently blind in that eye. It was after the injury to her eye that Walker began to take up reading and writing. The scar tissue was removed when Walker was 14, but a mark still remains. It is described in her essay "Beauty: When the Other Dancer is the Self".

As the schools in Eatonton were segregated, Walker attended the only high school available to Black students: Butler Baker High School. There, she went on to become valedictorian, and enrolled in Spelman College in 1961 after being granted a full scholarship by the state of Georgia for having the highest academic achievements of her class. She found two of her professors, Howard Zinn and Staughton Lynd, to be great mentors during her time at Spelman, but both were transferred two years later. Walker was offered another scholarship, this time from Sarah Lawrence College in Yonkers, New York, and after the firing of her Spelman professor, Howard Zinn, Walker accepted the offer. Walker became pregnant at the start of her senior year and had an abortion; this experience, as well as the bout of suicidal thoughts that followed, inspired much of the poetry found in Once, Walker's first collection of poetry. Walker graduated from Sarah Lawrence College in 1965.

== Writing career ==
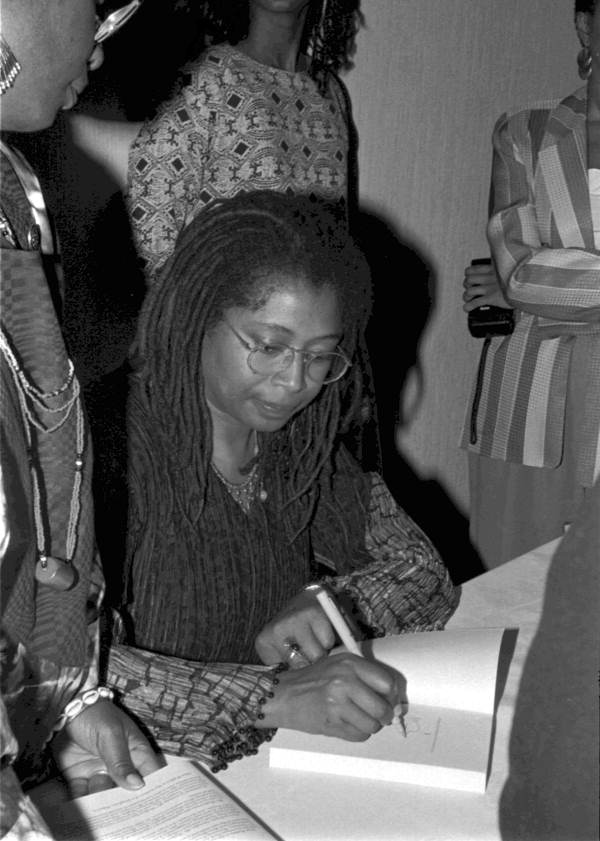
Walker signing autographs in Florida in 1990

Walker wrote the poems that would culminate in her first book of poetry, entitled Once, while she was a student in East Africa and during her senior year at Sarah Lawrence College. Walker would slip her poetry under the office door of her professor and mentor, Muriel Rukeyser, when she was a student at Sarah Lawrence. Rukeyser then showed the poems to her literary agent. Once was published four years later by Harcourt Brace Jovanovich.

Following graduation, Walker briefly worked for the New York City Department of Welfare, before returning to the South. She took a job working for the Legal Defense Fund of the National Association for the Advancement of Colored People in Jackson, Mississippi. Walker also worked as a consultant in Black history to the Friends of the Children of Mississippi Head Start program. She later returned to writing as writer-in-residence at Jackson State University (1968–69) and Tougaloo College (1970–71). In addition to her work at Tougaloo College, Walker published her first novel, The Third Life of Grange Copeland, in 1970. The novel explores the life of Grange Copeland, an abusive, irresponsible sharecropper, husband and father.

During this period, Walker published her work in small feminist and lesbian publications in the South associated with the women in print movement, including Sinister Wisdom and Feminary. The women in print movement was an effort by second-wave feminists to establish alternative communications networks of feminists publications, presses, and bookstores created by and for women. Later, at the inaugural National Feminist Bookstore Week in 1995, Walker signed a "feminist writer's pledge" proclaiming the significance of feminist and lesbian presses, along with Jewelle Gomez, Tee Corinne, Dorothy Allison, and Blanche McCrary Boyd.

In 1973, before becoming editor of Ms. magazine, Walker and literary scholar Charlotte D. Hunt discovered an unmarked grave they believed to be that of Zora Neale Hurston in Ft. Pierce, Florida. Walker had it marked with a gray marker stating ZORA NEALE HURSTON / A GENIUS OF THE SOUTH / NOVELIST FOLKLORIST / ANTHROPOLOGIST / 1901–1960. The line "a genius of the south" is from Jean Toomer's poem Georgia Dusk, which appears in his book Cane. Hurston was actually born in 1891, not 1901.

Walker's 1975 article "In Search of Zora Neale Hurston", published in Ms. magazine and later retitled "Looking for Zora", helped revive interest in the work of this Afro-American writer and anthropologist. In 1976, Walker's second novel, Meridian, was published. Meridian is a novel about activist workers in the South, during the civil rights movement, with events that closely parallel some of Walker's own experiences. In 1982, she published what has become her best-known work, The Color Purple. The novel follows a young, troubled Black woman who is not just fighting her way through a racist white culture, she is also fighting her way through a patriarchal Black culture. The book became a bestseller, and it was subsequently adapted into a critically acclaimed 1985 movie which was directed by Steven Spielberg, starring Oprah Winfrey and Whoopi Goldberg, as well as a 2005 Broadway musical totaling 910 performances.

Walker has written several other novels, including The Temple of My Familiar (1989) and Possessing the Secret of Joy (1992) (which featured several characters and descendants of characters from The Color Purple). She has published a number of collections of short stories, poetry, and other writings. Her work is focused on the struggles of Black people, particularly women, and their lives in a racist, sexist, and violent society.

In 1993, Alice Walker coauthored a novel, Warrior Marks, alongside feminist activist Pratibha Parmar. The novel was based on the topic of Female Genital Mutilation (FGM) and the Sexual Blinding of Women. The novel takes place in Africa, where the two of them collectively interview several survivors of FGM. The novel seeks to unearth the sociocultural rationale behind the practice by providing a platform to activists who stand in opposition to this issue.

In 2000, Walker released a collection of short fiction, based on her own life, called The Way Forward Is With a Broken Heart, exploring love and race relations. In this book, Walker details her interracial relationship with Melvyn Rosenman Leventhal, a civil rights attorney who was also working in Mississippi. The couple married on March 17, 1967, in New York City, since interracial marriage was then illegal in the South, and divorced in 1976. They had a daughter, Rebecca, together in 1969. Rebecca Walker, Alice Walker's only child, is an American novelist, editor, artist, and activist. The Third Wave Foundation, an activist fund, was co-founded by Rebecca and Shannon Liss-Riordan. Her godmother is Alice Walker's mentor and co-founder of Ms. magazine, Gloria Steinem.

In 2007, Walker donated her papers, consisting of 122 boxes of manuscripts and archive material, to Emory University's Manuscript, Archives, and Rare Book Library. In addition to drafts of novels such as The Color Purple, unpublished poems and manuscripts, and correspondence with editors, the collection includes extensive correspondence with family members, friends and colleagues, early treatment of the film script for The Color Purple, syllabi from courses she taught, and fan mail. The collection also contains a scrapbook of poetry compiled when Walker was 15, entitled "Poems of a Childhood Poetess".

In 2013, Alice Walker published two new books, one of them entitled The Cushion in the Road: Meditation and Wandering as the Whole World Awakens to Being in Harm's Way. The other was a book of poems entitled The World Will Follow Joy: Turning Madness into Flowers (New Poems).

== Activism ==
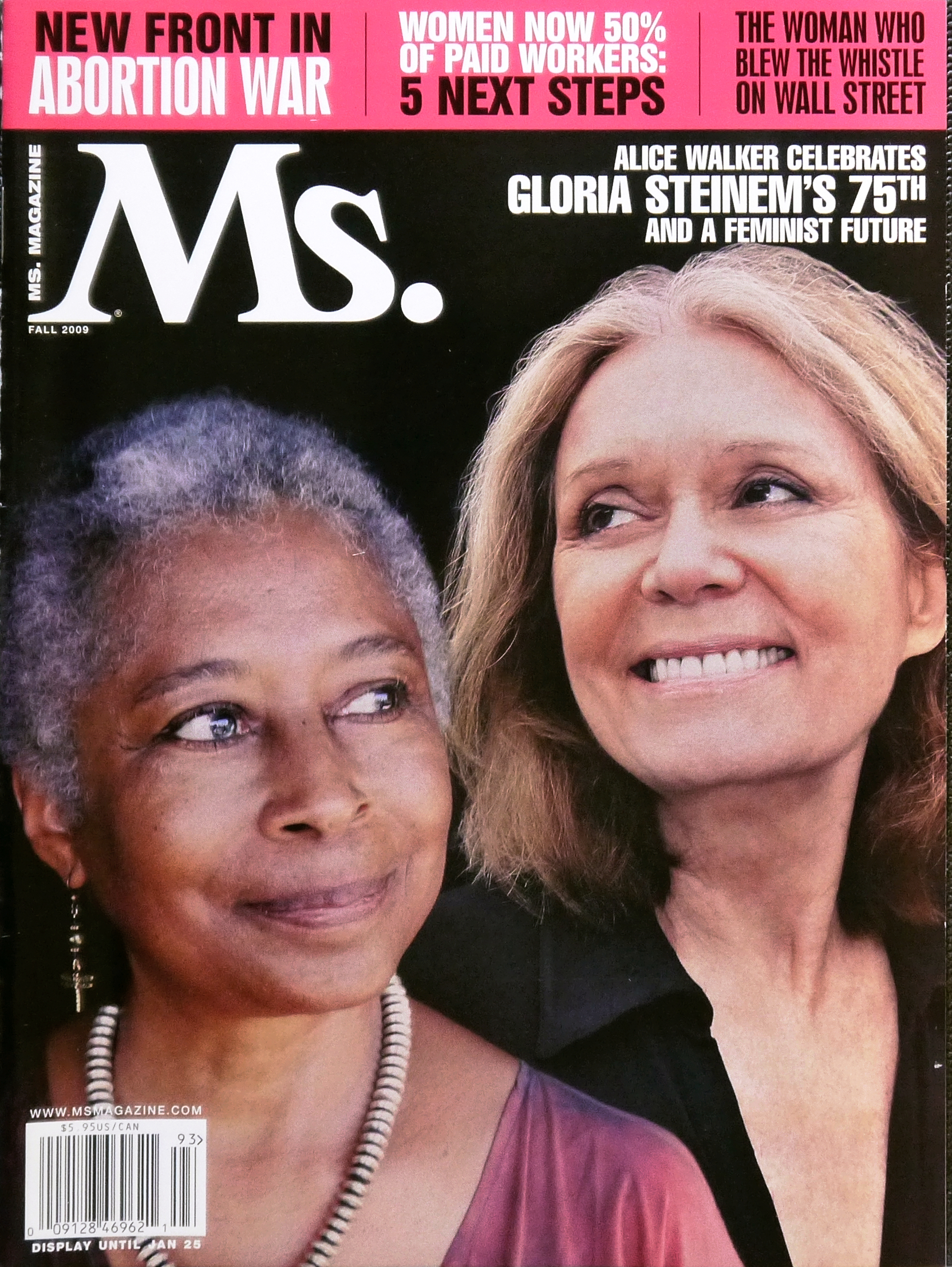
Walker (left) and Gloria Steinem on the Fall 2009 cover of Ms. magazine

=== Civil rights ===
Walker met Martin Luther King Jr. when she was a student at Spelman College in the early 1960s. She credits King for her decision to return to the American South as an activist in the Civil Rights Movement. She took part in the 1963 March on Washington with hundreds of thousands of people. Later, she volunteered to register Black voters in Georgia and Mississippi.

On March 8, 2003, International Women's Day, on the eve of the Iraq War, Walker was arrested with 26 others, including fellow authors Maxine Hong Kingston and Terry Tempest Williams, at a protest outside the White House, for crossing a police line during an anti-war rally. Walker wrote about the experience in her essay "We Are the Ones We Have Been Waiting For".

=== Womanism ===
Walker's specific brand of feminism included advocacy on behalf of women of color. In 1983, Walker coined the term womanist in her collection In Search of Our Mothers' Gardens, to mean "a Black feminist or feminist of color". The term was made to unite women of color and the feminist movement at "the intersection of race, class, and gender oppression". Walker states that "'Womanism' gives us a word of our own". because it is a discourse of Black women and the issues they confront in society. Womanism as a movement came into fruition in 1985 at the American Academy of Religion and the Society of Biblical Literature to address Black women's concerns from their own intellectual, physical, and spiritual perspectives." Today, her womanist ideology still persists within several movements including the Black Lives Matter Movement that was formed by Black women in response to police brutality against Black males. The philosophy of womanism also served as the fundamental basis for the #MeToo Movement in which women publicly expressed their experiences of sexual abuse and harassment.

=== Feminist advocacy ===
Walker's idea of feminist advocacy emerged in her work, In Search of Our Mothers' Gardens, specifically in the essay, If the Present Looked Like the Past, what would the future Look Like?. In her piece, she reflects on the modern injustices and historical oppression of the feminist movement. She also touches upon the need for compassion, empathy and awareness on behalf of Black women to overcome the past atrocities such as slavery and colonialism. In the end, the essay provides both a critique on the Black feminist movement and a call to action for readers to liberate themselves from discrimination.

=== Israeli–Palestinian conflict ===
Walker is a judge member of the Russell Tribunal on Palestine, and she also supports the Boycott, Divestment and Sanctions campaign against Israel.

In January 2009, Walker was one of over fifty signatories of a letter protesting against the Toronto International Film Festival's "City to City" spotlight on Israeli filmmakers, and condemning Israel as an "apartheid regime". Two months later, Walker and sixty other female activists from the anti-war group Code Pink traveled to Gaza in response to the Gaza War. Their purpose was to deliver aid, meet with NGOs and residents, and persuade Israel and Egypt to open their borders with Gaza. She planned to visit Gaza again in December 2009 to participate in the Gaza Freedom March. On June 23, 2011, she announced plans to participate in an aid flotilla to Gaza that attempted to break Israel's naval blockade.

In May 2013, Walker posted an open letter to singer Alicia Keys, asking her to cancel a planned concert in Tel Aviv. "I believe we are mutually respectful of each other's path and work," Walker wrote. "It would grieve me to know you are putting yourself in danger (soul danger) by performing in an apartheid country that is being boycotted by many global conscious artists." Keys rejected the plea. Walker has refused to allow The Color Purple to be translated and published in Hebrew, saying that she finds that "Israel is guilty of apartheid and persecution of the Palestinian people, both inside Israel and also in the Occupied Territories" and noting that she had refused to allow Steven Spielberg's film adaptation of her novel to be shown in South Africa until the system of apartheid was dismantled.

=== Support for Chelsea Manning and Julian Assange ===
In June 2013, Walker and others appeared in a video expressing their support for Chelsea Manning, an American soldier who was imprisoned for releasing classified information. In recent years, Walker has spoken out repeatedly in support of Julian Assange. Founder of Wikileaks, Assange was considered a large threat to U.S. national security during the Obama administration, as he revealed classified intelligence information surrounding war crimes and human rights violations in Iraq, Afghanistan, and Guantanamo Bay. Subsequently, Assange was arrested after attempting to seek refuge in the Ecuador embassy in London. He was later extradited to the U.S. and prosecuted on criminal charges. In light of these developments, Alice Walker published an Opinion Editorial taking aim at the US justice system and calling for the vindication of the charges brought against Assange. Moreover, Walker also took part in a panel discussion in Berkeley, California for the purpose of freeing Assange.

=== Animal advocacy ===
Walker has expressed that animal advocacy is one of her central concerns. Her fiction has increasingly embraced animal ethics over the past four decades, as she works to include animals as both active participants in her novels and as symbols for what she has called "consciousness." Her earliest fiction represents nonhuman animals inasmuch as they are part of human life – namely as farmed animals, food sources, and absent referents for animalized epithets directed at humans, and her fiction increasingly incorporates the animal experience. She has advocated for greater consciousness in human beings and their relationships with animals, stating: "Encouraging others to love nature, to respect other human beings and animals, to adore this earth, is part of my work in this world."

=== Pacifism ===
Walker has been a longtime sponsor of the Women's International League for Peace and Freedom. In early 2015, she wrote: "So I think of any movement for peace and justice as something that is about stabilizing our inner spirit so that we can go on and bring into the world a vision that is much more humane than the one we have dominant today." She has written several works that convey her pacifist views, those including The Same River Twice and We are the Ones We have been Waiting for: Inner Light in a Time of Darkness. She discusses the importance for establishing an equitable and peaceful society.

=== Transgender rights ===
In 2023, Walker publicly defended J. K. Rowling from criticisms of her views regarding trans people. Walker wrote on her website: "I consider J.K. Rowling perfectly within her rights as a human being of obvious caring for humanity to express her views about whatever is of concern to her. As she has done." She herself expressed the view that women were being "erased" in language, dictionaries and society, and that "confusion" with respect to gender had led to hasty sex reassignment surgeries, at least when minors were concerned. Walker was criticized on social media for taking this position with many referring to her as a TERF. In a subsequent essay, Walker addressed trans people, stating: "I fully understand that your life belongs to you; therefore whatever changes you make, I offer my prayers for a beautiful transformation and complete recovery", and acknowledged that one of the "most loving and balanced people" she knew was a trans man.

== Accusations of antisemitism and praise for David Icke ==
Since 2012, Walker has expressed appreciation for the works of the British conspiracy theorist David Icke. On BBC Radio 4's Desert Island Discs, she said that Icke's book Human Race Get Off Your Knees: The Lion Sleeps No More, which contains antisemitic conspiracy theories, would be the book she would take to a desert island. The book promotes the theory that the Earth is ruled by shapeshifting reptilian humanoids and "Rothschild Zionists". Jonathan Kay of the National Post described this book (and Icke's other books) as "hateful, hallucinogenic nonsense". Kay wrote that Walker's public praise for Icke's book was "stunningly offensive" and that by taking it seriously, she was disqualifying herself "from the mainstream marketplace of ideas". In 2013, the Anti-Defamation League called anti-Zionist essays in Walker's book The Cushion in the Road "replete with fervently anti-Jewish ideas" and it also stated that Walker was "unabashedly infected with anti-Semitism".

On her blog in 2017, Walker published a poem which she titled "It Is Our (Frightful) Duty to Study The Talmud", recommending that the reader should start with YouTube to learn about the allegedly shocking aspects of the Talmud, describing it as "poison". The poem contained antisemitic tropes and arguments. In it, she also "describes her reaction when a Jewish friend", later stated to be her ex-husband, accused her "of appearing to be antisemitic".

In 2018, an interviewer from The New York Times Book Review asked Walker "What books are on your nightstand?" She listed Icke's And the Truth Shall Set You Free, a book promoting an antisemitic conspiracy theory which draws on The Protocols of the Elders of Zion and questions the Holocaust. Walker said: "In Icke's books there is the whole of existence, on this planet and several others, to think about. A curious person's dream come true." The publication of the interview in the "By the Book" weekly column generated significant criticism of Walker and the New York Times Book Review. The Review was criticized for publishing the interview as well as for failing to contextualize And the Truth Shall Set You Free as an antisemitic work. Walker defended her admiration for Icke and his book, saying: "I do not believe he is anti-Semitic or anti-Jewish". Walker argued that any "attempt to smear David Icke, and by association, me, is really an effort to dampen the effect of our speaking out in support of the people of Palestine". Following the controversy Roxane Gay argued that "Alice Walker has been anti-Semitic for years". The NYT released a statement that the contents of the interview "do not imply an endorsement by Times editors".

In 2019, Ayanna Pressley disavowed antisemitism after an uproar ensued following her tweeting of an Alice Walker quote. She tweeted "I fully condemn and denounce anti-Semitism, prejudice and bigotry in all their forms – and the hateful actions they embolden" and said she had been unaware of Walker's statements on the issue.

In 2020, after learning about Walker's perceived support of antisemitism, the host of the New York Times podcast Sugar Calling described herself as "mortified" for having hosted Walker on her show and she also said: "If I'd known, I wouldn't have asked Alice Walker to be on the show."

In April 2022, Gayle King of CBS News was criticized for interviewing Walker without challenging her antisemitic writings. After the interview, King released a statement, saying: "These are not only legitimate questions, they are mandatory questions. I certainly would have asked her about the criticisms, if I had been aware of them before the interview with Ms. Walker."

In 2022, Walker was disinvited from the Bay Area Book Festival due to what the organizers referred to as her "endorsement of anti-Semitic conspiracy theorist David Icke". An invitation for Walker to speak at San Diego Community College District was upheld despite opposition from community groups, with the organizers citing their belief in free speech. Walker dismissed the criticism as "a ploy to shut down my webpage blog: alicewalkersgarden.com."

== Personal life ==
In 1965, Walker met Melvyn Rosenman Leventhal, a Jewish civil rights lawyer. They were married on March 17, 1967, in New York City. Later that year, the couple relocated to Jackson, Mississippi, becoming the first legally married interracial couple in Mississippi since miscegenation laws were introduced in the state. The couple had a daughter, Rebecca, in 1969. Walker and her husband divorced in 1976.

In the late 1970s, Walker moved to northern California. In 1984, she and fellow writer Robert L. Allen co-founded Wild Tree Press, a feminist publishing company in Anderson Valley, California. Walker legally added "Tallulah Kate" to her name in 1994 to honor her mother, Minnie Tallulah Grant, and paternal grandmother, Tallulah. Minnie Tallulah Grant's grandmother, Tallulah, was Cherokee.

Walker has claimed that she was in a romantic relationship with singer-songwriter Tracy Chapman in the mid-1990s: "It was delicious and lovely and wonderful and I totally enjoyed it and I was completely in love with her but it was not anybody's business but ours." Chapman has not publicly commented on the existence of a relationship between herself and Walker and maintains a strict separation between her private and public life.

Walker's spirituality has influenced some of her best-known novels, including The Color Purple. She has written of her interest in Transcendental Meditation. Walker's exploration of religion in much of her writing draws on a literary tradition that includes writers like Zora Neale Hurston.

Walker has never denied that there are some autobiographical dimensions to her stories. When "Advancing Luna—and Ida B. Wells" was first published in Ms. magazine, Walker included a disclaimer that "Luna and Freddie Pye are composite characters, and their names are made up. This is a fictionalized account suggested by a number of real events". John O' Brien's 1973 interview with Walker offers further details.

== Teaching and Feminist Rights Movement ==
Aside from her civil rights activism, Walker would often educate others about the Black feminist movement through her teachings at several different higher education institutions. In the fall of 1972, Walker taught a course in Black Women's Writers at the University of Massachusetts Boston. as well as Wellesley College in 1973. Moreover, that same year, she also published her primary collection of short stories In Love and Trouble: Stories of Black Women, as well as Revolutionary Petunias and Other Poems which served as a second volume of her poetry. In addition, she also taught an American Women studies class at Brandeis University in Waltham. Aside from the schools in Massachusetts at which she taught at, she gave several lectures on the topics of African-American Women Studies at Yale University as well as University of California, Berkeley. Overall, Walker gave several lectures at a variety of different institutions throughout America which allowed her to spread the ideas of the Black feminist movement.

== Representation in other media ==
Beauty in Truth (2013) is a documentary film about Walker directed by Pratibha Parmar. Phalia (Portrait of Alice Walker) (1989) is a photograph by Maud Sulter from her Zabat series originally produced for the Rochdale Art Gallery in England.

== Awards and honors ==
- MacDowell Colony Fellowships (1967 and 1974)
- Ingram Merrill Foundation Fellowship (1967)
- Candace Award, Arts and Letters, National Coalition of 100 Black Women (1982)
- Pulitzer Prize for Fiction (1983) for The Color Purple
- National Book Award for Fiction (1983) for The Color Purple (Note: From 1980 to 1983, there were dual hardcover and paperback awards of the National Book Award for Fiction. Walker won the award for hardcover fiction.)
- O. Henry Award for "Kindred Spirits" (1985)
- Langston Hughes Medal, (1988), City College of New York
- Honorary degree from the California Institute of the Arts (1995)
- American Humanist Association named her as "Humanist of the Year" (1997)
- Lillian Smith Award from the National Endowment for the Arts
- Rosenthal Award from the National Institute of Arts & Letters
- Radcliffe Institute Fellowship, the Merrill Fellowship, and a Guggenheim Fellowship
- Front Page Award for Best Magazine Criticism from the Newswoman's Club of New York
- Induction into the Georgia Writers Hall of Fame (2001)
- Induction into the California Hall of Fame in The California Museum for History, Women, and the Arts (2006)
- Domestic Human Rights Award from Global Exchange (2007)
- The LennonOno Grant for Peace (2010)
- The Haydée Santamaría medal (2024)

== Selected works ==
=== Novels and short story collections ===
- The Third Life of Grange Copeland (1970)
- In Love and Trouble: Stories of Black Women (1973, includes "Everyday Use")
- Meridian (1976)
- The Color Purple (1982)
- You Can't Keep a Good Woman Down: Stories (1982)
- To Hell With Dying (1988)
- The Temple of My Familiar (1989)
- Finding the Green Stone (1991)
- Possessing the Secret of Joy (1992)
- The Complete Stories (1994)
- By the Light of My Father's Smile (1998)
- The Way Forward Is with a Broken Heart (2000)
- Now Is the Time to Open Your Heart (2004)

=== Poetry collections ===
- Once (1968)
- Revolutionary Petunias and Other Poems (1973)
- Good Night, Willie Lee, I'll See You in the Morning (1979)
- Horses Make a Landscape Look More Beautiful (1985)
- Her Blue Body Everything We Know: Earthling Poems (1991)
- Absolute Trust in the Goodness of the Earth (2003)
- A Poem Traveled Down My Arm: Poems And Drawings (2003)
- Collected Poems (2005)
- Hard Times Require Furious Dancing: New Poems (2010)
- The World Will Follow Joy (2013)
- Taking the Arrow Out of the Heart (2018)

=== Non-fiction books ===
- In Search of Our Mothers' Gardens: Womanist Prose (1983)
- Living by the Word: Selected Writings, 1973–1987 (1988)
- Warrior Marks: Female Genital Mutilation and the Sexual Blinding of Women (with Pratibha Parmar, 1993)
- The Same River Twice: Honoring the Difficult (1996)
- Anything We Love Can Be Saved: A Writer's Activism (1997)
- Sent By Earth: A Message from the Grandmother Spirit, After the Bombing of the World Trade Center and Pentagon (2001)
- We Are the Ones We Have Been Waiting For: Inner Light in a Time of Darkness (2006)
- Pema Chödrön and Alice Walker in Conversation: On the Meaning of Suffering and the Mystery of Joy (2005)
- Overcoming Speechlessness: A Poet Encounters the Horror in Rwanda, Eastern Congo, and Palestine/Israel (2010)
- The Chicken Chronicles: Sitting with the Angels Who Have Returned with My Memories: Glorious, Rufus, Gertrude Stein, Splendor, Hortensia, Agnes of God, the Gladyses, & Babe, A Memoir (2011)
- The Cushion in the Road: Meditation and Wandering as the Whole World Awakens to Being in Harm's Way (2013)

=== Essays ===
- "Beauty: When the Other Dancer is the Self" (1983)
- "Am I Blue?" (1986)

== See also ==
- List of animal rights advocates
