= List of feminist women of color =

The list below includes women of color who identify as feminist, including intersectional, Black, Chicana, and Mexican feminism.

Feminist Name	Birth Period	Country/Race/Ethnicity	Feminist work/Activist work/Comments	Education	Pronouns/Sexuality
Dr. Pauli Murray	November 20, 1910– July 1, 1985	Country: United States Race: African American (Black)	In 1930, Murray worked for the Works Projects Administration (WPA).; She worked as a teacher in New York City Remedial Reading Project.; Involved in the civil rights movement 1938.; Arrested in March 1940 for being involved to end segregation on public transit in Virginia.; Traveled to Ghana to explore African roots.; In 1960, Murray was appointed to the committee of Civil Political Rights by John F Kennedy.; Worked closely with Martin Luther King Jr, Phillip Randolph, Bayard Rustin etc.; First African-American woman to become an Episcopal Priest.; Books, articles and poems published include: Angel of Desert, Dark Testament, Negroes are Fed Up, States Laws on Race and Color, Proud Shoes: The Story of An American Family.; Died of cancer on July 1, 1985.	Applied to Columbia University but was rejected because of her gender.; Attended Hunter College in 1933 and graduated with a Bachelor of Arts degree in English.; Applied to University of North Carolina in 1938 but was rejected due to her race.; Attended Howard University and graduated the top of her class (Chief Justice of the Howard Court of Peers) in 1944.; Did postgraduate work at Bolt Hall School of Law and University of California, Berkeley.	Queer woman (she, her, hers).
Audre Lorde	February 18, 1934 – November 17, 1992	Country: United States Race: African American (Black)	Lorde devoted her life to fighting racism, sexism and homophobia.; She dropped the y at the end of Audre because she found the (e) ending in both her first and last name artistically symmetric.; In 1966, Lorde became a librarian at Town School in New York.; Lorde led workshops for black art students at the University of Mexico.; In 1984, Lorde started a professorship in Berlin, Germany at the University of Berlin. During her time in Germany she used her platform to empower women. She played a huge role within the Afro-German movement.; Books, articles and poems published include: Coals, The First Cities, Cables to Rage, From a Land Where Other People Live, Between Our Selves, Hanging Fire, The Black Unicorn, Sister Outsider, The Cancer Journals.; In 1978, Lorde was diagnosed with breast cancer and she died on November 17, 2012	Attended National University of Mexico in 1954.; Attended Hunter College and graduated in 1959.; Attended Columbia University earning her master's degree in Library Science in 1961.	Lesbian woman (she, her, hers)
Frances Beal	January 13, 1940 –	Country: United States Race: Russian/Jew, African American (Black) and Native American.	Beal wrote Double Jeopardy: To Be Black and Female in 1969. Double Jeopardy was revised and published in The Black Woman, which was edited by Toni Cade.; Also appeared in the anthology called Sisterhood is Powerful: An Anthology of Writings From the Women's Liberation Movement in 1970.	Attended Sorbonne (The University of Paris).	N/A
bell hooks (Gloria Jean Watkins)	September 25, 1952	Country: United States Race: African American (Black)	In 1976, bell hooks taught at the University of Southern California. During the time, her chapbook of poems called And There We Wept was published.; Hooks also taught at a few other Universities during the '80s: San Francisco State University and the University of California-Santa Cruz, Yale University, Oberlin College and the City College of New York.; In 1981, South End Press published her work Ain't I A Woman?: Black women and feminism.; Throughout hooks' feminism, she has written numerous books on topics such as white supremacy, patriarchy, and masculinity.; In 2002, hooks gave a very controversial commencement speech at Southwestern University on "government-sanctioned violence" and oppression which caused an uproar.; Feminist theory, media theory and film theory.	Attended Stanford University in 1973, receiving her B.A. in English.; Attended the University of Wisconsin-Madison in 1976, receiving her M.A. in English.; Attended the University of California, Santa Cruz in 1983, receiving her Ph.D. in literature.	N/A
Julianne Malveaux	September 22, 1953	Country: United States Race: African American	Throughout Malveaux journey, she made herself known while acknowledging problems within the African-American community.; Malveaux work has appeared on USA Today, The Progressive and Essence magazine, while also appearing on different platforms including BET, C-SPAN, CNBC, and CNN.; She had a radio program on the left-wing Pacifica Radio Network.; In 2007, Malveaux become the 15th President of Bennett College for Women in Greensboro, North Carolina.	Attended Boston college earning her B.A. and M.A. in Economics.; Attended MIT earning her Ph.D. in economics.; Also holds honorary degrees from Benedict College, Sojourner-Douglass College and University of the District of Columbia.	N/A
Toni Morrison	February 18, 1931	Country: United States Race: African American (Black)	Morrison is the first African-American women to win the Nobel Prize in Literature.; Morrison was a professor at Texas Southern University and the State University of New York.; Published the novels The Bluest Eye, Sula, Song of Solomon, Beloved, and Tar Baby.; Awarded the Pulitzer Prize for Beloved in 1988.; In 1993, she became an official member of the American Literature Association.; Awarded the National Humanities Medal in 2000.; Awarded the Pell Award for Lifetimes Achievement in Arts and the Enoch Pratt free Literary Achievement Award in 2001.; Awarded the NAACP Image Award for Outstanding Literary Work-fiction for Love.; Wrote the libretto for "Margaret Garner" and was premiered in 2005.; Awarded the Presidential Medal of Freedom by President Barack Obama in 2012.; Morrison receives the 2016 Charles Eliot Norton Professor of Poetry Award at Harvard University.	Attended Howard University in 1949, receiving her B.A. in English.; Attended Cornell University, receiving her M.A. in Master's of Arts.	N/A
Angela Davis	January 26, 1944	Country: United States Race: African American (Black)	In 1969, Davis began teaching at the University of California, Los Angeles as an assistant philosophy professor. During that time Davis was also a part of the radical feminist movement, the Black Panther Party and the Communist Party. Because of her activism within the Communist party, Davis was fired.; In 1970, Davis was put on the FBI's Most Wanted Fugitive List due to the allegations of her being involved with the Johnathan Jackson altercation. In 1972, the charges were dropped and she was removed from the list.; The governor of California at the time, Ronald Reagan, campaigned against Davis to prevent her from teaching, but he failed and Davis went on to teach Women and Ethnic Studies at San Francisco State University in 1977.; During her time. Davis published numerous books, including If They Come Morning (1971), Women, Race and Class (1981), Women, Culture and Politics (1989), Are Prisons Obsolete? (2003), Freedom is a Constant Struggle (2016).	Attended Brandeis University, earning her B.A. (magna cum laude).; Attended the University of California, San Diego, earning her M.A.; Attended Humboldt University, earning her Ph.D.	N/A
Kimberlé Crenshaw	1959	Country: United States Race: African American (Black)	Crenshaw is the founder of critical race theory which highlights areas of civil rights, constitutional law and race studies.; In 1995, she became a professor at Columbia Law School.; In 1996, she created a non-profit program that focused on gender and diversity called "Think Tank".; Crenshaw is the co-founder and executive director of African American Policy Reform (AAPF): removing structural inequality.; One of Crenshaw's biggest accomplishments was constructing Intersectionality in relation to women of color and black men all over the world.; Her work influenced equality clauses in Africa.; Crenshaw also published a lot of writings that shaped the way we look at racism, domestic violence, the judicial system etc. all in relation to our identities and oppressions: On Intersectionality: Essential Writings of Kimberlé Crenshaw, Black Girls Matter: Pushed Out, Over Policed and Under Protected, Reaffirming Racism: The faulty logic of Colorblindness, Remedy and Diversity, Mapping the Margins: Intersectionality, Identity Politics and Violence against Women of Color and so forth.	Attended Cornell University earning her B.A. in Government and African American Studies.; Attended Harvard Law School earning her J.D.; Attended the University of Wisconsin Law School earning her LL.M.	N/A
Janet Mock	March 10, 1983	Country: United States Ethnicity: Hawaiian Race: African American/Hawaiian	Janet Mock is a trans woman who has dedicated her life to raise trans awareness and creating inclusive spaces for the trans community.; In 2006, Mock started her career with People magazine, where she was staff editor for more than five years.; She later took on the role of media advocate after an interview with Lea Goldman publicly telling the world she is a trans woman.; In 2012, Mock published her first book called Redefining Realness: My Path to Womanhood, Identity, Love & So Much More. It was the first piece to be written by a trans person who told a story of their life before transitioning.; During a Q&A with Tribune Business New York, Mock shared some of the women who influenced her work: Maya Angelou, Alice Walker, Toni Morrison and Zora Neale Hurston.; In 2012, Mock started a hashtag on Twitter called #GirlsLikeUs to empower trans women all over the world.; In 2012, Mock received the Sylvia Rivera Activist Award.; Mock also worked hand in hand with a campaign fighting for the release of Monica Jones, who was arrested for "prostitution" in 2014.	Attended University of Hawaii at Manoa earning her B.A. in Fashion Merchandising and Masters of Arts in Journalism.	Trans woman (she, her, hers)
Amandla Stenberg	October 23, 1998	Country: United States Race: African American (Black), Danish	Amandla Stenberg defines themself within feminism and activism while using their platform to educate people on white privilege, oppression and social constructions.; In 2015, Stenberg discussed media and societal portrayals of black women's bodies. "Do black females lives matter, too?" —Stenberg.; Stenberg also used their platform to educate people on cultural appropriation, using Kylie Jenner as an example.; In using their platform, they invited Jaden Smith to prom, which sparked conversation on masculinity seeing that Smith chose to wear a dress to prom. They immediately made space to talk about masculinity in a way that men should be able to present themselves the way they choose without society forcing toxic masculinity and gender roles on them.; Stenberg was also called the voice of the generation.	Enrolled in film school at New York University starting in 2016	Pansexual non-binary person (they, them theirs)
Laverne Cox	May 29, 1972	Country: United States Race: African American (Black)	In 2013, Cox became the first transgender woman of color to play a leading role on a mainstream scripted television show in the Netflix original Orange Is the New Black; In 2014, Cox became the first trans woman to be featured on the cover of Time magazine; In 2014, Cox became the first trans woman to be nominated for an Emmy, earning her nomination in the category of "Outstanding Guest Actress in a Comedy Series"; As an advocate for moving beyond gender expectations to live more authentically, she was also named as one of Glamour magazine's 2014 Women of the Year, one of The Grio's 100 Most Influential African Americans, one of the Top 50 Trans Icons by the Huffington Post, and honored with the Courage Award from the Anti-Violence Project, and the Reader's Choice Award from Out Magazine	Attended Alabama School of Fine Arts in high school; Attended Indiana University in Bloomington for two years before transferring to Marymount Manhattan College, earning her BFA in Dance	Trans woman (she, her, hers)
