= The Erotic =

Concept in critique of porn culture

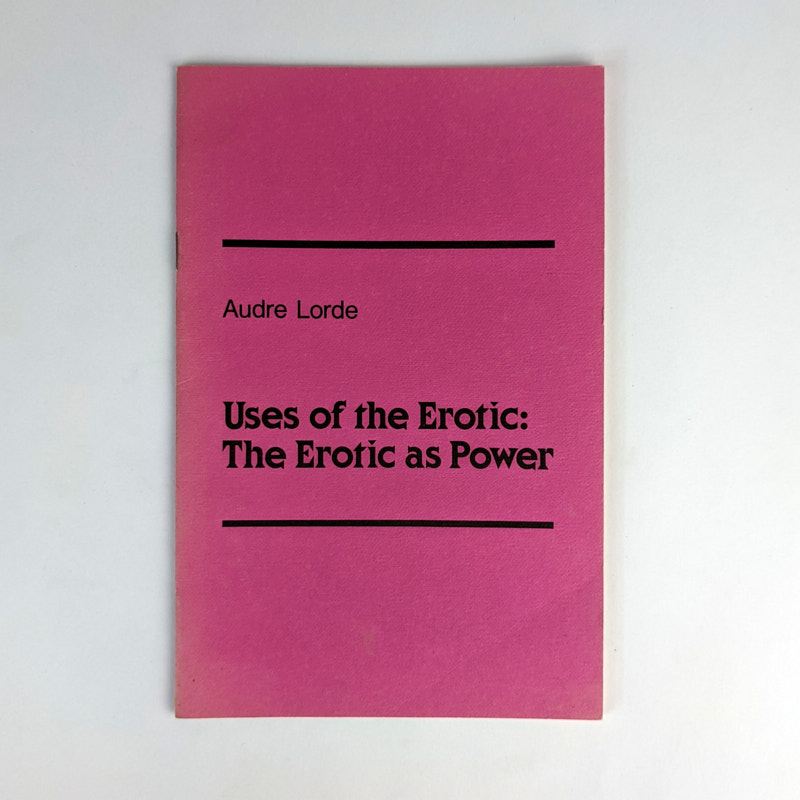
Red Cover of Out & Out Pamphlet No. 3.

The Erotic is a concept of a source of power and resources that are available within all humans, which draws on feminine and spiritual approaches to introspection. The erotic was first described by Audre Lorde in her 1978 essay in Sister Outsider, "Uses of the Erotic: The Erotic as Power". The essay was later published in 1982 as a pamphlet by Out & Out Books.

Lorde's essay on the erotic conceptualizes the erotic as a subliminal power that all women possess that provides satisfaction and joy in several ways besides lust and carnal desire. Other feminist scholars moved on with Lorde's argument on the erotic's purpose in daily life, furthering this progressive theory into a more contemporary understanding of everyday life and modern porn culture. Since the foundational work set forth by Lorde, feminist discourses on the nature of empowerment and human exchange have been inspired by her writings.

== Conceptualization of the erotic ==
Audre Lorde's presentation at the Fourth Berkshire Conference on the History of Women in 1978 was pivotal in bringing the erotic into feminist discourse. Conferences such as this one at Mount Holyoke College did open a space for one to speak explicitly about women's history, but forbade any discourse concerning lesbian identity. Lorde and her panelists resisted by naming the panel "Lesbians and Power," leading conference organizers to eliminate the word "lesbian" and give the panelists a very small room. In response, there was a flyer campaign where Lorde and others reclaimed their title, leading to a venue that would accommodate around two thousand people.

During the event, Lorde read her essay, calling societal norms by redefining the erotic as a source of strength and resistance, making a critical contribution to feminist and queer discourses. One of the first instances of the time to remove negative connotations from the word "erotic," this form of thinking inspired those beyond Lorde to break down the walls and barriers of aspects of femininity that are considered taboo, and to embrace those aspects rather than to live in shame of it. By showing how identities, those including race and sexuality, could be a powerful way to express independence and personality, Lorde inspired women to express their identity openly, rather than to hide or disregard these aspects of their identities. This became important in fostering even more inclusive feminist spaces that recognized the importance of the connections between race, sexuality, and class.

In the essay, Lorde describes the erotic as "the nurturer or nursemaid of our deepest knowledge," meaning it is an important source of one's inner wisdom, comfort, and insight into one's self. Through this lens, the erotic becomes a powerful resource in enabling women to reclaim and honor parts of themselves that otherwise would be cast aside. When she says, "The erotic is a lens through which we can scrutinize all aspects of our existence," she means that the erotic is not just something related to sensation; it is a tool in deepening one's relationship with themselves to inspire a fuller, more intentional engagement with life. Lorde describes the erotic as "a well of replenishing and provocative force to the woman who does not fear its revelation, nor succumb to the belief that sensation is enough," she claims the erotic as a source of replenishment and creative vigor for one willing to open fully to it. The erotic is a deep and abiding force for women who do not fear its depth or deny it by forcing it into limited preconceptions of what it represents: just physical pleasure. Lorde suggests that such a deeper understanding of the erotic would move beyond a superficial feeling to allow women access to a more complete sense of self which would be benefit them intellectually, emotionally, and spiritually.

== Elements of the erotic ==
The scholar Caleb Ward argues that there are four essential facets of the erotic as described by Lorde that help remove some of the associated ambiguity surrounding the term:

1. The erotic is about feeling.
2. The erotic is a source of knowledge.
3. The erotic is a source of power in the face of oppression.
4. The erotic can catalyze concerted political action and coalition across differences.

The etymology of the erotic comes from the Greek word eros, which Audre Lorde describes as "the personification of love in all its aspects".

== Misinterpretation of the erotic through pornography ==
Over time, Audre Lorde's idea of the erotic has gotten misconstrued and oversimplified into a concept focusing on physical or sexual pleasure. This interpretation fails to represent the inner strength and creativity that Lorde attached to the erotic. Misreading it solely in relation to sexuality, the erotic loses its radical potential that it could embody as a force towards empowerment, connection, and resistance. More than a sensual pleasure, the erotic, for Lorde was deeply connected to one's work and relationships. That connection was powerful, carrying knowledge and inner strength that could empower people to resist and challenge multiple oppressive systems.

Lorde writes that "The erotic has often been misnamed by men and used against women…[confused] with its opposite, the pornographic… [and] pornography emphasizes sensation without feeling". Lorde proposes the erotic has often been confused with pornography, though they are inherently distinct. In addition, she states that "pornography is a direct denial of the power of the erotic, for it represents the suppression of true feeling. Pornography emphasizes sensation without feeling". Pornography suppresses true feelings and focuses on superficial sensations, while the erotic represents a deeply emotional connection and creativity. Lorde relates the erotic to feminine and spiritual creativity, describing it as "the lifeforce of women; of that creative energy empowered, the knowledge and use of which [women] are now reclaiming in our language, our history, our dancing, our loving, our work, our lives…[and exemplify] how acutely and fully we can feel in doing."

Additionally, the term "erotic" has often been misrepresented and used as a tool to over-sexualize and under value women in a patriarchal society. While this term is often synonymous with pornography, it was meant to provide liberation for women, a freedom that can be found from self reflection and human connection with other woman. Patriarchal and capitalist systems diminish the erotic by prioritizing profit over human needs and reducing both work and life to mere duties. This suppression disconnects people from the joy and creative power inherent in their work. The primary mechanism of oppression, is found in the misuse and understanding of systemic power structures that continue to oppress women in their voice and expression of self. The erotic has the potential to be transformative. When women embrace the erotic, they resist societal oppression, including racism, sexism, and the patriarchal structures that dictate how they should live.

== Erotic in everyday life ==
In "Uses of the Erotic," Lorde highlights the transformative potential of incorporating the erotic in daily life, drawing an analogy between the erotic and a deep source of joy and energy found in simple yet creative acts. The erotic transforms ordinary actions, such as dancing, writing, or creating, into profound satisfaction and fulfillment that empowers individuals to live more authentic and passionate lives. Engaging with the erotic enables women to gain more profound satisfaction and wholeness in their lives. It drives excellence and emotional fulfillment across all aspects of life, extending beyond sexual contexts. Embracing and utilizing the erotic appropriately empowers women to pursue greater depth and meaning in their lives, work, and relationships.

The etymological affiliation of the Erotic as eros with notions of "life force" or "creative energies" underlines the presence of the Erotic in daily life. Though it is tied to passion and sensuality, in Audre Lorde's terms, the erotic is "far more than sexual or sensual contexts; it motivates excellence, survival, and delight through all of life's activities." This influence reveals itself in the small, meaningful moments that bring self-realization and dignity to simple, everyday acts. The Erotic is expressed when a person invests deeply in what truly fulfills them, like cooking a meal with care or taking the time to savor nature. In these simply daily actions, joy and happiness emerge, emphasizing experiences that align with one’s values and encourage a genuine, holistic way of living.

Lorde also suggests sharing the erotic promotes in-depth emotional connections and strengthens interpersonal bonds. Lorde proposes, "The sharing of joy [...] forms a bridge between the sharers which can be the basis for understanding much of what is not shared between them, and lessens the threat of their difference." This form of sharing involves mutual joy and recognition of each other's humanity rather than using each other as a means of superficial satisfaction.

== Furthering the erotic: insights from other feminist scholars ==
The idea of the erotic as a source of power and agency has been furthered by a number of feminist scholars and activists in the late 20th century. For example, in All About Love: New Visions, bell hooks argues that love opens people to intimate connections in a way very similar to Lorde's idea of the erotic. For Hooks, the erotic as love strengthens connections with others to be the grounding for solidarity to effectively resist systems of oppression and reclaim one's identity.

Similarly, writer and activist Adrienne Rich questioned the political practice of compulsory heterosexuality within her essay "Compulsory Heterosexuality and Lesbian Existence." She writes in the foreword that "the depth and breadth of woman identification and woman bonding... can become increasingly a politically activating impulse." This echoes the concept of the erotic: the idea of women in solidarity, connected in intimacy, to take back their power and resist oppressive systems.

In her book How Three Black Women Writers Combined Spiritual and Sexual Love, Cherie Ann Turpin explains the way that the similarities between Audre Lorde, Dionne Brand, and Toni Morrison all similarly conceptualize the erotic within their works. As stated in the foreword by Frank E. Dobson Jr. “ Turpin discusses intellectual recovery and ownership of the black woman's body, through the evocation of the erotic. "The erotic is a disruption of the test that insists on sameness, the 'pattern' that gives the impression of totality" (4). In discussing this disruption, she suggests that each of the authors imagines and articulates erotic subjectivity in such a manner that tradition and stereotype are confronted and countered.” This echoes Lorde’s own call to action within the erotic to feel its power firsthand. “The erotic cannot be felt secondhand. As a Black lesbian feminist, I have a particular feeling, knowledge, and understanding for those sisters with whom I have danced hard, played, or even fought. This deep participation has often been the forerunner for joint concerted actions not possible before.”

== Use in the critique of modern porn culture ==
Catharine MacKinnon, an American legal scholar, builds upon Lorde's concepts that underscore the pornographic as a form of oppression by emphasizing that pornography not only works to oppress the erotic power of women, but also suppresses women's freedom of speech in her piece "Pornography, Civil Rights, and Speech". Pornography eroticizes "the unspeakable abuse: the rape, the battery, the sexual harassment, the prostitution, and the sexual abuse of children. Only in the pornography it is called something else: sex, sex, sex, sex, and sex, respectively" which thus contributes to the perpetuation of inequality between men and women, promoting a sense of normalization for these atrocities of abuse. The erotic power that Lorde describes, a resource that "lies in a deeply female and spiritual plane" becomes twisted, perverted and used against women to maintain female subordination in the pornographic. In her work, MacKinnon draws connections between pornographic depictions of sexual acts and documented cases of sexual assault in which the abusive actions of the male perpetrator demonstrate a direct correlation between the pornographic depictions of sexuality and sexual acts of aggression. In this same work, she quotes a study detailing cases in which men who watched pornography depicting acts of sexual assault self-reported to being more inclined towards committing aggressive acts of behavior towards women, including greater likelihood of engaging in acts of sexual assault. These images create a desensitization regarding this particular type of aggressive behavior constructing a reality that silences women and the violence committed against women's bodies. When women report instances of sexual assault or violent sexual behavior, their voices are dismissed, as pornography has distorted the reality of sexual aggression. Pornography becomes another way of silencing women, another way of distorting their experiences. Pornography becomes the snatching away of credibility, sexual violence replaced with a westernized version of 'eroticism'.

== Audre Lorde ==
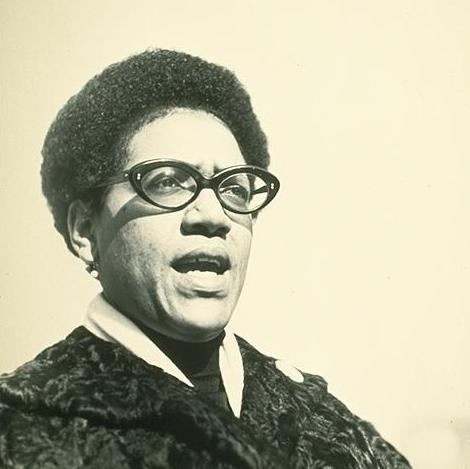
Audre Lorde

Audre Lorde (1934–1992) is best known for her work as an, "American poet, essayist, and autobiographer known for her passionate writings on lesbian feminism and racial issues." Her powerful writing included over a dozen publications in the form of poetry and essays, winning multiple national and international awards for her writing, and was one of the primary founders of Kitchen Table: Women of Color Press. She has also been hailed as, " The Black feminist, lesbian, poet, mother, and warrior." Other famous poems and essays written by Lorde include:

- A Burst Of Light
- The Black Unicorn
- Between Ourselves
- Cables To Rage
- The Cancer Journals
- The First Cities
- From A Land Where Other People Live
- I Am Your Sister: Black Women Organizing Across Sexualities
- Lesbian Party: An Anthology
- Need: A Chorale For Black Women Voices
- The New York Head Shop And Museum
- Our Dead Behind Us: Poems
- Sister Outsider: Essays And Speeches
- The Marvelous Arithmetics Of Distance: Poems
- Undersong: Chosen Poems Old And New
- Uses Of The Erotic: The Erotic As Power
- Woman Poet—The East
- Zami: A New Spelling of My Name

== See also ==
- Black lesbian literature in the United States
- Berkshire Conference of Women Historians
- Kitchen Table: Women of Color Press
- Black Feminism
- Black Feminist Thought
- Sister Outsider
- Audre Lorde Project
- Community Organizing
