= Eroticism =

Quality that causes sexual feelings

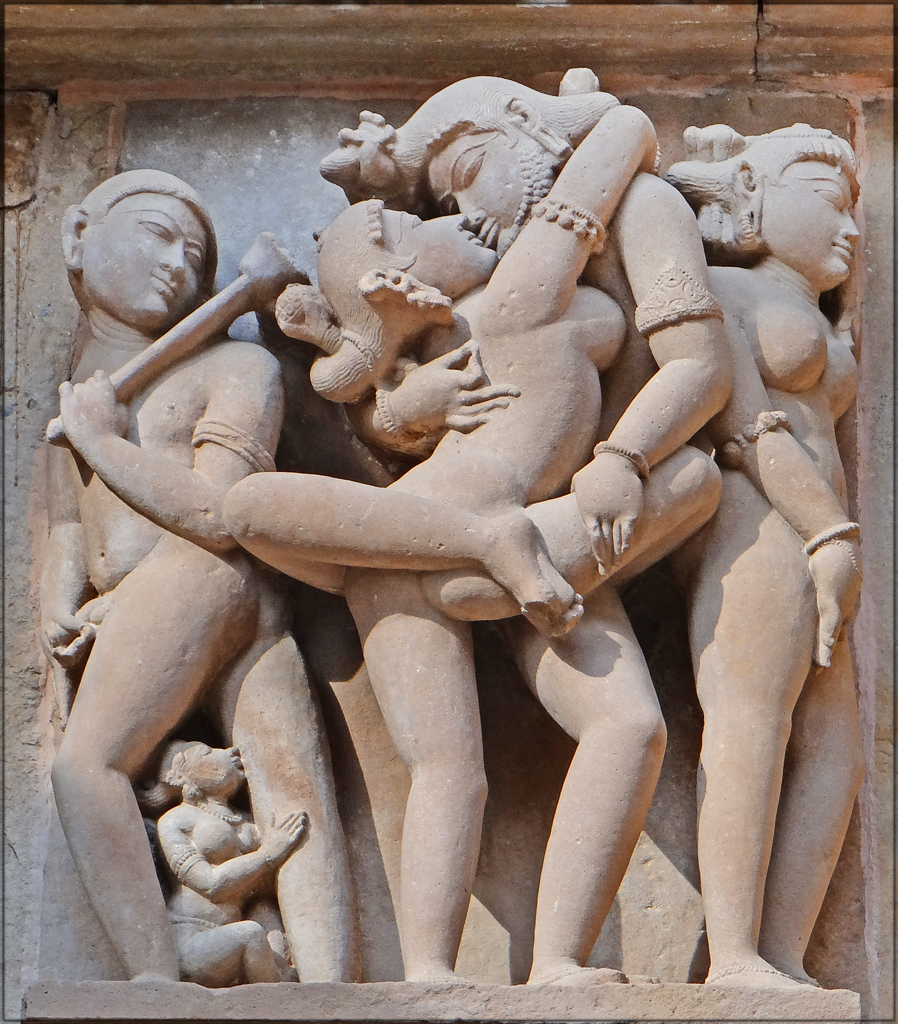
Erotic Kama statues at the Khajuraho Temple, India; the image portrays in the centre a female and male entwined in maithuna, whilst at each side a gazing male and female masturbate.

Eroticism (from Ancient Greek ἔρως (érōs) 'love, desire' and -ism) is a quality that causes sexual feelings, as well as a philosophical contemplation concerning the aesthetics of sexual desire, sensuality, and romantic love. That quality may be found in any form of artwork, including painting, sculpture, photography, drama, film, music, or literature. It may also be found in advertising. The term may also refer to a state of sexual arousal or anticipation of such – an insistent sexual impulse, desire, or pattern of thoughts.

As French novelist Honoré de Balzac stated, eroticism is dependent not just upon an individual's sexual morality, but also the culture and time in which an individual resides.

== Definitions ==
Because the nature of what is erotic is fluid, early definitions of the term attempted to conceive eroticism as some form of sensual or romantic love or as the human sex drive (libido); for example, the Encyclopédie of 1755 states that the erotic "is an epithet which is applied to everything with a connection to the love of the sexes; one employs it particularly to characterize...a dissoluteness, an excess". Libertine literature such as those by John Wilmot, 2nd Earl of Rochester evoked eroticism to the readers.

Because eroticism is wholly dependent on the viewer's culture and personal tastes pertaining to what, exactly, defines the erotic, critics have often confused eroticism with pornography, with anti-pornography activist Andrea Dworkin saying, "Erotica is simply high-class pornography; better produced, better conceived, better executed, better packaged, designed for a better class of consumer." This confusion, as Lynn Hunt writes, "demonstrate[s] the difficulty of drawing... a clear generic demarcation between the erotic and the pornographic": "the history of the separation of pornography from eroticism... remains to be written".

Audre Lorde recognises eroticism and pornography as "two diametrically opposed uses of the sexual", defining the erotic as "a measure between the beginnings of our sense of self and the chaos of our strongest feelings." In her 1978 essay, Uses of the Erotic: The Erotic as Power, Lorde identifies the erotic as a source of creative power that is deeply rooted in a spiritual plane of unrecognised or unexpressed feeling and sensation.

== Psychoanalytical approach ==
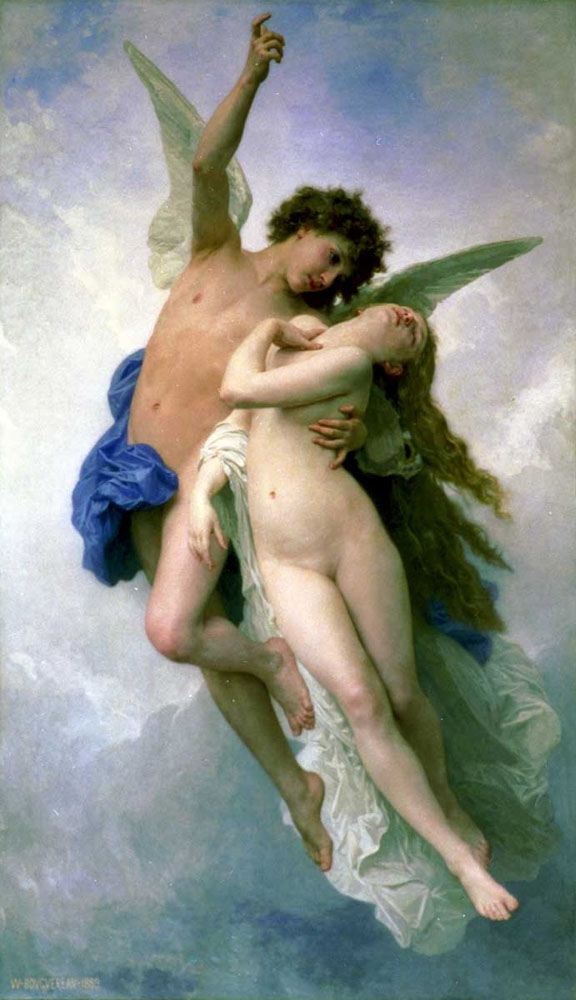
Psyche and Love by William-Adolphe Bouguereau (1889)

Influenced by Sigmund Freud, psychotherapists have turned to Greek philosophy for an understanding of eros' heightened aesthetic. For Plato, Eros takes an almost transcendent manifestation when the subject seeks to go beyond itself and form a communion with the object/other: "the true order of going...to the things of love, is to use the beauties of earth as steps...to all fair forms, and from fair forms to fair actions, and from fair actions to fair notions, until from fair notions he arrives at the notion of absolute beauty".

== French philosophy ==
Modern French conceptions of eroticism can be traced to the Age of Enlightenment, when "in the eighteenth century, dictionaries defined the erotic as that which concerned love...eroticism was the intrusion into the public sphere of something that was at base private". This theme of intrusion or transgression was taken up in the twentieth century by the French philosopher Georges Bataille, who argued that eroticism performs a function of dissolving boundaries between human subjectivity and humanity, a transgression that dissolves the rational world but is always temporary, as well as that, "Desire in eroticism is the desire that triumphs over the taboo. It presupposes man in conflict with himself". For Bataille, as well as many French theorists, "Eroticism, unlike simple sexual activity, is a psychological quest...eroticism is assenting to life even in death".

== Non-heterosexual ==
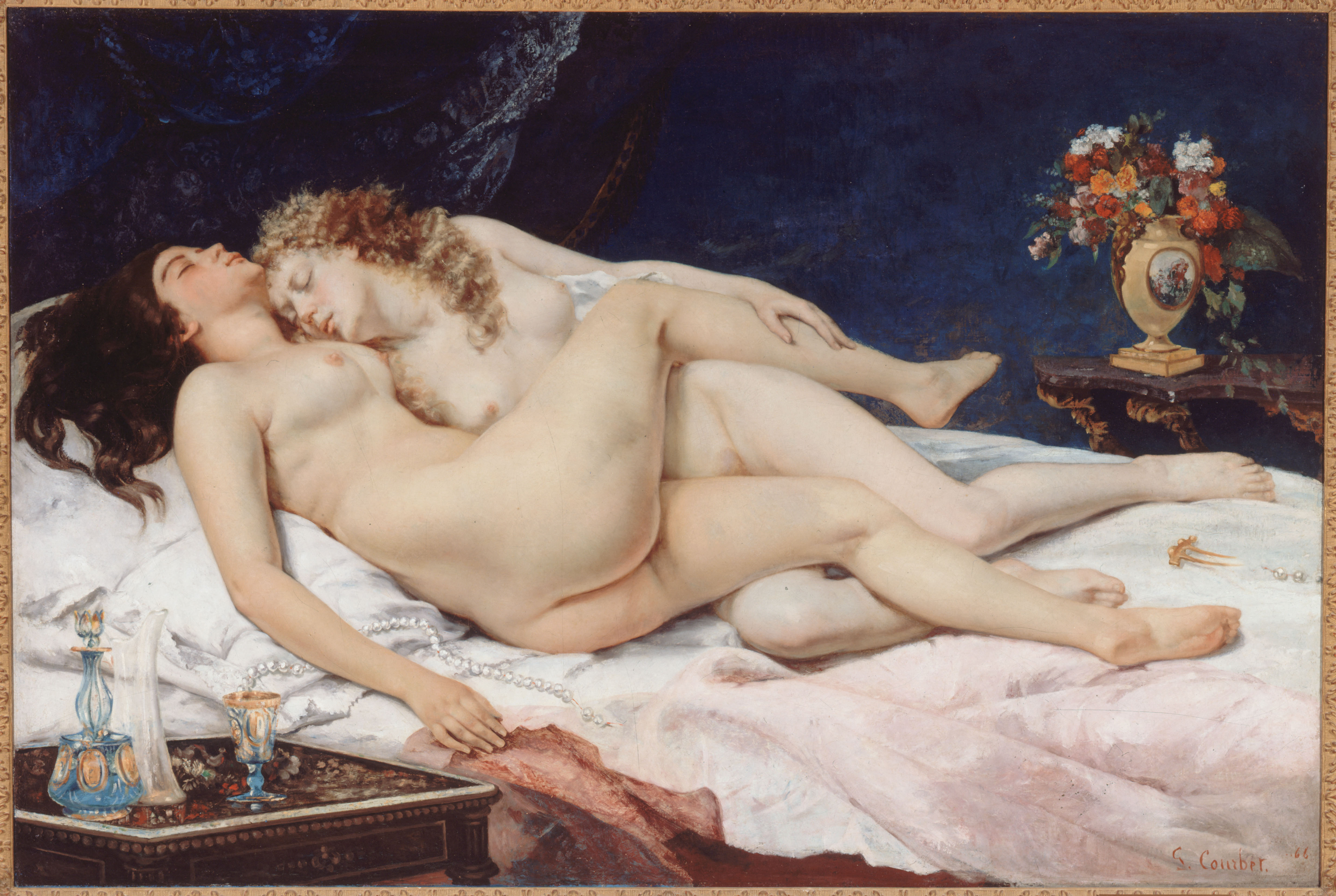
Le Sommeil (The Sleepers) by Gustave Courbet (1866)

Queer theory and LGBTQ studies consider the concept from a non-heterosexual perspective, viewing psychoanalytical and modernist views of eroticism as both archaic and heterosexist, written primarily by and for a "handful of elite, heterosexual, bourgeois men" who "mistook their own repressed sexual proclivities" as the norm.

Theorists like Eve Kosofsky Sedgwick, Gayle S. Rubin and Marilyn Frye all write extensively about eroticism from a heterosexual, lesbian and separatist point of view, respectively, seeing eroticism as both a political force and cultural critique for marginalized groups, or as Mario Vargas Llosa summarized: "Eroticism has its own moral justification because it says that pleasure is enough for me; it is a statement of the individual's sovereignty".

Audre Lorde, a lesbian Caribbean-American writer and outspoken feminist, called the erotic a source of power specifically identified with the female, often corrupted or distorted by oppression, since it poses the challenge of change. "For women, this has meant a suppression of the erotic as a considered source of power and information within our lives". In "The Uses of the Erotic" within Sister Outsider, she discusses how the erotic comes from the sharing of joy, "whether physical, emotional, psychic, or intellectual" and provides the basis on which understanding provides a foundation for acknowledging difference. Lorde suggests that if we suppress the erotic rather than recognize its presence, it takes on a different form. Rather than enjoying and sharing with one another, it becomes objectifying, which she says translates into abuse as we attempt to hide and suppress our experiences.

== See also ==
- Beauty
- Erogenous zone
- Eros
- Erotic art
- Erotica
- History of erotic depictions
- History of nude art
- Homoeroticism
- Limit-experience
- Nudity
- Pin-up girl
- Pornography
- Romance
- Sexual intercourse
- Sex-positive movement
