= The Lazarus Man =

- Genre: Western
- Created by: Dick Beebe
- Starring: Robert Urich
- Theme music composer: John Debney
- Composer: Charles Sydnor
- Country of origin: United States
- Original language: English
- No. of seasons: 1
- No. of episodes: 22 (2 unaired)

Production
- Executive producers: Michael Ogiens; Norman S. Powell
- Producers: John Binder; Harvey Frand; Marc Scott Zicree
- Cinematography: Ross A. Maehl
- Editor: Scott Powell
- Camera setup: Single-camera
- Running time: 43 mins.
- Production companies: The Ogiens/Kane Company; Castle Rock Entertainment; Turner Program Services

Original release
- Network: TNT
- Release: January 20 – November 23, 1996

The Lazarus Man is an American Western television series produced by Castle Rock Entertainment which first aired on January 20, 1996, and ended on November 23, 1996. Starring Robert Urich as the title character, The Lazarus Man debuted on TNT and ran for 20 episodes.

== Plot ==
The setting for the series is Texas following the American Civil War. An amnesiac claws his way out of a shallow grave wearing a Confederate uniform and carrying a U.S. Army revolver. He is haunted by the memory of being attacked by a man wearing a derby. Calling himself Lazarus after the man resurrected by Jesus (John 11:41-44), he sets out to discover his true identity and the reason why he was buried alive.

Near the end of the series, Lazarus is revealed to be James Cathcart, a captain in the US Army and a member of President Abraham Lincoln's personal bodyguard detail. The memory that plagues him is from the night of April 14, 1865, when Lincoln was shot at Ford's Theatre. Cathcart, realizing that the President was in danger, ran to stop the assassin, but was attacked by his superior, the treasonous Major Talley, who wanted to see Lincoln dead.

== Cancellation ==
The series first season did well enough to warrant TNT to order a second season. However, the series' production company, Castle Rock Entertainment, cancelled the series after Urich was diagnosed with synovial cell sarcoma, in July 1996. Urich later sued Castle Rock for breach of contract. In the suit, Urich maintained that although he was undergoing cancer treatments, he never informed Castle Rock that he would be unable to perform in the series. Castle Rock decided to cancel the series anyway and failed to pay Urich the $1.47 million he was to be paid for a second season. The lawsuit was later settled with both parties agreeing not to publicly disclose the terms.

== Episodes ==
No.	Title	Original release date
1	"Awakening (Part 1)"	January 20, 1996
After awaking in a grave with no memory, Lazarus tries to piece his life together.
2	"Awakening (Part 2)"	January 27, 1996
Lazarus helps the family who took him in, facing off against a corrupt soldier (Brion James) and his men.
3	"The Palace of Dreams"	February 3, 1996
Lazarus meets an eccentric card shark (Carl Lumbly) with a mysterious grudge.
4	"Purgatory"	February 10, 1996
Lazarus is recognized by a Civil War veteran (Stephen McHattie) once under his command.
5	"The Conspirator"	February 17, 1996
A Federal agent (Tom Mason) with a vendetta against Lazarus has him arrested and sentenced to death.
6	"The Boy General"	February 24, 1996
General Custer (Maxwell Caulfield) hires Lazarus to sniff out threats against him from his troops.
7	"The Cattle Drive"	March 2, 1996
Lazarus takes up cattle rustling and must fend off enemies who emerge from his hazy past.
8	"Panorama"	March 9, 1996
The exhibition of an artist (Anthony Rapp) prompts gunslingers to line up to challenge "The man who can't be killed"—Lazarus himself.
9	"The Wallpaper Prison"	March 16, 1996
Lazarus finds a kindred spirit in a forlorn prostitute (Kate Hodge), stuck at an isolated outpost.
10	"The Catamount"	March 30, 1996
A malicious cavalry officer (Nicolas Surovy) plans to mete out "justice" near an archeological dig and site of grisly murders.
11	"Among The Dead"	April 20, 1996
Lazarus takes refuge in an eerily quiet town with a troubled woman (Jennifer Nash).
12	"The Journal"	April 27, 1996
A prospector is murdered after striking it rich, and Lazarus runs into a coverup.
13	"Jehovah and Son, Inc."	May 4, 1996
An unbalanced man (Armin Shimerman) shoots a senator with Lazarus's gun.
14	"The Rescue"	May 11, 1996
A Comanche man battles the militia over a white woman (Kellie Overbey) raised by his tribe.
15	"The Angel Maker"	1996
Lazarus meets a mail-order bride (Mariska Hargitay) who reminds him of his wife, but with a sinister side.
16	"The Penance"	October 19, 1996
Lazarus tries to protect a pacifist sect of farmers from the wrath of cattlemen.
17	"Killer"	May 18, 1996
Lazarus takes a liking to a fellow Civil War vet-turned-bounty hunter and becomes his partner.
18	"The Hold-Up"	October 12, 1996
When the mining company payroll is taken during a stagecoach robbery, Lazarus is blamed.
19	"The Sheriff"	October 26, 1996
An embittered gunslinger (Michael Massee) returns to punish his hometown.
20	"Quality of the Enemy"	November 9, 1996
A cynical bounty hunter, contemptuous of the human race, returns to take Lazarus into custody for The Major.
21	"The Tartarus Wheel"	November 16, 1996
After undergoing hypnosis, Lazarus remembers that he used to be an Army Intelligence officer.
22	"Dance With Shadows"	November 23, 1996
The Major sets a trap using Lazarus's wife as bait, allowing Lazarus to uncover his past.

== Home media ==
On February 13, 2018, Warner Bros. Home Entertainment (via Warner Archive) released the complete series on DVD. The episodes appear out of chronological order on the DVD box set.
