= Your Silence Will Not Protect You =

2017 essay collection

- Author: Audre Lorde
- Language: English
- Genre: Non-Fiction
- Publisher: Silver Press
- Publication date: October 2, 2017
- Publication place: United Kingdom
- Media type: Print (Paperback)
- Pages: 230 pp (paperback 1st edition)
- ISBN: 978-0995716223

Your Silence Will Not Protect You is a 2017 posthumous collection of essays, speeches, and poems by Caribbean American author and poet Audre Lorde. It is the first time a British publisher collected Lorde's work into one volume. The collection focuses on key themes such as: shifting language into action, silence as a form of violence, and the importance of history. Lorde describes herself as a "Black, lesbian, mother, warrior, poet", and addresses the difficulties in communication between Black and white women.

The collection is made up of five sections: a preface by Reni Eddo-Lodge, an introduction by Sara Ahmed, 13 essays, 17 poems, and a Note on the Text. As the Note on the Text states, many of the essays in the collection were given as papers at conferences across the U.S. The essays were all previously published in Lorde's 1984 book Sister Outsider. Further, Lorde often revised early poems and re-published them, so many of the poems in this collection are the latest versions of Lorde's work.

== Background ==
Your Silence Will Not Protect You was published posthumously in order to bring together Lorde's essential poetry, speeches, and essays, into one volume for the first time. As Silver Press states, "Her extraordinary belief in the power of language – of speaking – to articulate selfhood, confront injustice and bring about change in the world remains as transformative today as it was then, and no less urgent".

=== Title ===
"Your Silence Will Not Protect You" is a quote from the first essay to appear in the collection, "The Transformation of Silence into Language and Action". She states, "My silences had not protected me. Your silences will not protect you". This references her belief in speaking for oneself and taking language into action.

== Summary ==
=== Essays ===
In "The Transformation of Silence into Language and Action", Lorde discussed various themes that recur throughout the book, including silence as a form of violence, shifting language into action, and the splintering of the feminist movement. She argued that using her voice to speak and connect with other women during her treatment gave her strength, "I am not a casualty, I am also a warrior".

"Uses of the Erotic: The Erotic as Power" discussed how each person has both used and unused types of power. She speaks to the dichotomy of sexuality, and in particular how women have been suppressed from utilizing its power. "We have been taught to suspect this resource, vilified, abused, and devalued within western society". She also argued that erotic connection can be used as a form of exploration for self-expression, "In touch with the erotic, I become less willing to accept powerlessness...such as resignation, despair, self-effacement, depression, self-denial".

"A Conversation between Audre Lorde and Adrienne Rich" discussed different periods in Lorde's life, and her struggles with family, writing, and teaching. At one point, she discusses how Black women were sexually assaulted and harmed during times of revolution. She recalls, "And while we’d be trying to speak to them as women, all we’d hear is, "The revolution is here, right?'. Seeing how Black women were being used and abused was painful”. She also highlights the differences in protecting one's communities, "And this is what happens between Black men and women because we have perfected certain kinds of weapons that white women and men have not shared".

"The Master's Tools Will Never Dismantle the Master's House" is a commentary on a speech Lorde gave at The Second Sex Conference at New York University in 1978. She criticizes the lack of representation for "poor women, Black women, Third World Women, and lesbians", having been asked to speak at 'The Personal and the Political' panel. She argued that those who are poor, Black, older, lesbians, and the different intersections of these groups, have been made to stand alone and unpopular. She states, "For the master's tools will never dismantle the master's house. They may allow us temporarily to beat him at his own game, but they will never enable us to bring about genuine change". Lorde called for recognition and representation of the differences between women, in an effort to fight inequality and survival.

=== Poems ===
In "Equinox" Lorde describes events in history which coincide with events in her life. She describes that the year her daughter was born was the same year W. E. B. Du Bois died, and the same year she marched into Washington. Then John F. Kennedy is assassinated, and the Vietnam War begins. She describes how her house burnt down with no one in it, and the following Sunday Malcolm X was shot dead. She reflects on how her children talk about "spring and peace" and she wonders if they'll ever fully understand the fighting that activists and Black communities have to do in order to survive. In "A Conversation between Audre Lorde and Adrienne Rich" Lorde states, "That this was the most we could do, while we constructed some saner future. But that we were in that kind of peril. And here it was reality, in fact. Some of the poems—'Equinox' is one of them—come from then".

In "For Each Of You" Lorde reinforced the idea of being proud and speaking your mind, especially for the Black community. She tells people to "be proud of who you are and who you will be", and "speak proudly to your children wherever you may find them". According to a series of interviews conducted with Lorde, this poem "urges women, Black women specifically, to break through their silence because it is the only way to break through to each other".

In "A Poem For Women in Rage", Lorde describes hatred being launched at her by a white woman, and the dilemma of whether or not to respond with violence. Through fury and rage, Lorde confronts the issues between white and Black women—fear and love—and how, "I am weeping to learn the name of those streets my feet have worn thin with running and why they will never serve me".

"Sister Outsider" is a poem from which Lorde drew the name for her most famous book. Lorde compares how, "We were born poor in a time never touching each other's hunger" but that now, children are raised to respect themselves and each other. She argues that while accepting and acknowledging the best parts of oneself are important, it is equally important to recognize the dark parts as well.

== Contents ==
This collection contains 13 essays and 17 poems, with the essays also including various speeches Lorde made.

Essays

- "The Transformation of Silence into Language and Action"
- "Poetry Is Not a Luxury"
- "Scratching the Surface: Some Notes on Barriers to Women and Loving"
- Uses of the Erotic: The Erotic as Power
- "Sexism: An American Disease in Blackface"
- "An Open Letter to Mary Daly"
- "Man Child: A Black Lesbian Feminist's Response"
- "A Conversation between Audre Lorde and Adrienne Rich"
- "The Master's Tools Will Never Dismantle the Master's House"
- "Age, Race, Class and Sex: Women Redefining Difference"
- "The Uses of Anger: Responding to Racism"
- "Learning from the 1960s"
- "Eye to Eye: Black Women, Hatred and Anger"

Poems

- "Equinox"
- "For Each of You"
- "Good Mirrors Are Not Cheap"
- "Black Mother Woman"
- "Love Poem"
- "Dear Toni"
- "Separation"
- "Blackstudies"
- "Martha"
- "A Litany for Survival"
- "Power"
- "School Note"
- "Sister Outsider"
- "Afterimages"
- "A Poem for Women in Rage"
- "Need: A Choral of Black Women's Voices"
- "Outlines"
