= Duke University Press =

University press

- Parent company: Duke University
- Founded: 1921
- Country of origin: United States
- Headquarters location: Durham, North Carolina
- Distribution: self-distributed (US); Combined Academic Publishers (UK)
- Publication types: Books, Academic journals
- Official website: dukeupress.edu

Duke University Press is an American academic publisher and university press affiliated with Duke University. It was founded in 1921 by William T. Laprade as The Trinity College Press (Duke University was initially called Trinity College). In 1926 Duke University Press was formally established. Ernest Seeman became its first director, followed by Henry Dwyer (1929–1944), W.T. LaPrade (1944–1951), Ashbel Brice (1951–1981), Richard Rowson (1981–1990), Larry Malley (1990–1993), Stanley Fish and Steve Cohn (1994–1998), Steve Cohn (1998–2019). As of 2020, Dean Smith was the director of the press.

It publishes approximately 150 books annually and more than 55 academic journals, as well as five electronic collections. The company publishes primarily in the humanities and social sciences but is also particularly well known for its mathematics journals. The book publishing program includes lists in African studies, African American studies, American studies, anthropology, art and art history, Asian studies, Asian American studies, Chicano/Latino and Latin American studies, cultural studies, film and TV studies, indigenous and Native American studies, music, political and social theory, queer theory/LGBT studies, religion, science studies, and women's and gender studies.

Notable authors published by Duke University Press include Achille Mbembe, Donna Haraway, Lauren Berlant, Arturo Escobar, Walter Mignolo, Jack Halberstam, Sara Ahmed, Jane Bennett, Patricia Hill Collins, Jennifer Christine Nash, Christina Sharpe, Dionne Brand, Fredric Jameson, Gloria Anzaldua, Eve Kosofsky Sedgwick, Stuart Hall, C.L.R. James, and James Baldwin.

== History ==
The press was founded in 1921 as Trinity College Press with William T. Laprade as its first director. Following a restructuring and expansion, the name was changed to "Duke University Press" in 1926 with William K. Boyd taking over as director.

Duke University Press founded the first non-medical peer-reviewed journal on transgender studies, Transgender Studies Quarterly, in 2014.

ARTnews named Duke University Press to its 2021 Deciders list, saying "Many a university press publishes worthy books about art—but none engages the subject and all it can mean quite like Duke University Press." In 2022, Amsterdam news stated, "Duke University Press is a leading academic publisher that has been pushing the envelope in Black non-fiction for the past decade. Their catalog becomes more robust each year by choosing Black thinkers who are ahead of the curve and experts in their fields."

In February 2021, Duke University Press announced the formation of the Scholarly Publishing Collective, a partnership with nonprofit scholarly journal publishers and societies to provide journal services including subscription management, fulfillment, hosting, and institutional marketing and sales.

== Open access ==
Duke is one of thirteen publishers to participate in the Knowledge Unlatched pilot, a global library consortium approach to funding open access books. Duke has provided books for the Pilot Collection. The press has also published nearly 100 additional books through other open access programs, including Towards an Open Monograph Ecosystem.

== See also ==
- List of English-language book publishing companies
- List of university presses
- Journals published by Duke University Press
