= Mythical norm =

Social concept by Audre Lorde

- Origin: Oral Paper Age, Race, Class and Sex: Women Redefining Difference in 1980
- Coined by: Audre Lorde
- Meaning: Social concept of a fictional unoppressed individual

Mythical Norm is a phrase coined by Audre Lorde in Age, Race, Class and Sex: Women Redefining Difference. The term describes the social concept of a fictional un-oppressed individual – or individual only experiencing privilege – that has become the norm and to which oppressed peoples identities, behaviors, and norms are compared. In other words, that people are defining and judging themselves and their communities against an unachievable normative standard and supposed superiority.

Lorde writes that "Those of us who stand outside that power often identify one way in which we are different, and we assume that to be the primary cause of all oppression, forgetting other distortions around difference, some of which we ourselves may be practising."

According to behavioral scientist Deboleena Roy, the "mythical norm occupies a position of privilege, or what Simone de Beauvoir called out as holding positions of both a positive and neutral subjectivity. It is from this view of the mythical norm and the subject position of positivity and neutrality that current and dominant traditions of philosophy and science have developed their systems of seeing, naming, and defining the world."

This construct differs in each society and culture based on identities of privilege. According to Lorde, "In America, this norm is usually defined as white, thin, male, young, heterosexual, Christian, and financially secure."

Primarily referenced within feminist and political theories, theory has also been adopted by Queer studies, Critical race studies, Disability studies, Biophilosophy, Ethnic studies, Film studies, and more.

The mythical norm was a foundational theory for Intersectionality.
