= Gloria Joseph =

Crucian-American academic, writer, educator, and activist (1927–2019)

Gloria I. Joseph
- Born: Gloria Ida Joseph; March 10, 1927; Saint Croix, Virgin Islands, U.S.
- Died: August 6, 2019 (aged 91); Saint Croix, Virgin Islands, U.S.
- Education: New York University (BS); City University of New York, City College (MS); Cornell University (PhD)
- Occupations: Writer, academic, activist
- Partner(s): Audre Lorde; Helga Emde

Gloria Ida Joseph (1927/1928 – August 6, 2019) was a Crucian-American academic, writer, educator, and activist. She was a self-identified radical Black feminist lesbian writer who synthesized art and activism in her work. Joseph's scholarship centered race, gender, sexuality, and class. She is known for her pioneering work on Black feminism and her activism on issues concerning Black women across the diaspora, including in South Africa, Germany, and the Caribbean.

== Early life and education ==
Born Gloria Ida Joseph to Daniel Joseph and Ida David Joseph, they emigrated from Saint Croix to New York City, where Joseph was raised. She was a strong student and also played basketball and field hockey in school. She was the great-niece of philanthropist and racketeer Casper Holstein.

Joseph attended New York University and received her bachelor of science degree in Health, Physical Education & Recreation. Later she received her master's degree in Psychological Services at City College of New York and then worked as a guidance counselor in New York City. Joseph went on to receive her doctoral degree in educational psychology at Cornell University in 1967.

== Career ==
Joseph worked at Hampshire College as a professor in the School of Social Sciences, where she was a founding faculty member and co-founded the school's Black studies department in 1969. Joseph also worked for COSEP, a committee where she helped recruit and retain Black and Latino students to the school. During her career she was a prolific writer and engaged the topics of feminism, race, sexuality, and activism. Joseph also founded the radical Che Lumumba School for Truth in Amherst, Massachusetts, and Sisterhood in Support of Sisters in South Africa, an advocacy and fundraising group for women in Soweto.

After her retirement from Hampshire College in the 1980s, she moved back to St. Croix with her life partner Audre Lorde, and continued to write and lecture at various universities as a professor emerita for another two decades. While there, the couple founded the Women's Coalition of St. Croix in 1981, which focused on eradicating local gender-based violence. Joseph also founded the Doc Loc Apiary for local honey production.

After Lorde's 1992 death Joseph published The Wind Is Spirit: The Life, Love and Legacy of Audre Lorde (2016), "a compilation of essays, photos, and recollections by a diverse group of contributors ruminating on how Lorde impacted their life, work, and activism." She and Lorde discussed the project extensively before Lorde's death. Joseph used Kickstarter to help fund the writing and publication. The anthology-biography received a 2017 Lambda Literary Award and the Association for Women in Psychology's 2017 Distinguished Publication Award.

== Personal life ==
Joseph was a lesbian. She was a life partner of prolific Black feminist writer Audre Lorde. They lived on Joseph's native island home of Saint Croix from 1981 until Lorde's death from cancer in 1992. Joseph later had a long-term relationship with Afro-German Helga Emde that lasted over 20 years until Joseph's death.

== Death ==
Joseph died on August 16, 2019, at age 91 at her home on Saint Croix.

== Works ==
- Common Differences: Conflicts in Black and White Feminist Perspectives (with J. Lewis). 1986, South End Press ISBN 9780896083172
- Hell Under God's Orders: Hurricane Hugo in St. Croix – Disaster and Survival (with H. Rowe and A. Lorde). 1990, Winds of Change Press ISBN 9780962797217
- On Time and In Step: Reunion on the Glory Road. 2008, Winds of Change Press ISBN 9780578002491
- The Wind is Spirit: The Life, Love, and Legacy of Audre Lorde. 2016, Villarosa Media ISBN 9781682190197
