= The Cancer Journals =

1980 book by Audre Lorde

- Author: Audre Lorde
- Language: English
- Genre: Non-fiction
- Publisher: Aunt Lute Books
- Publication date: 1980
- Publication place: United States
- Media type: Print (Hardback & Paperback)
- Pages: 77
- ISBN: 978-0933216037
- Dewey Decimal: 362.1/9699449
- LC Class: RC280.B8 L58 1980

The Cancer Journals is a 1980 book of non-fiction by Audre Lorde. It deals with her struggle with breast cancer.

== Summary ==
The Cancer Journals is a 1980 book of non-fiction by poet and activist Audre Lorde. It deals with her struggle with breast cancer and relates it to her strong advocacy and identity in certain social issues such as lesbian, civil rights, and feminist issues. The Cancer Journals consists of an introduction and three chapters, each featuring passages from her diary.

Audre Lorde's upbringing and background plays a key role in understanding her perspectives and passion about feminist, civil rights, and lesbian issues. Understanding the early developments of her life and her journey to writing poetry, leads to a better understanding of her work on The Cancer Journals and its significance.

Apart from the story Lorde tells in her book, it is also essential to understand her experience with cancer apart from the literary work. Her cancer battle serves as a catalyst for much of her work, and is thus an important aspect in understanding the bigger picture of The Cancer Journals.

The feminist themes that appear in The Cancer Journal have had tremendous impact on Lorde's legacy and in those respective realms of social culture.

== Audre Lorde background ==
Audre Lorde (February 18, 1934 – November 17, 1992) was a writer, feminist, womanist, and civil rights activist. Her work mostly relates to issues surrounding the female black identity, as well as feminism and civil rights. Her parents were both Caribbean immigrants, and she grew up with two older sisters, Phyllis and Helen. She was the youngest member of the family, and was nearsighted to the point of being deemed legally blind.

Growing up in Depression Era New York City, Lorde struggled to find her voice and turned to poetry and writing to express herself. Around the age of twelve, she began writing her own poetry and connecting with others at her school who were considered "outcasts", as she felt she was. Lorde spoke about her beginning in poetry in Black Women Writers: "I used to speak in poetry. I would read poems, and I would memorize them. People would say, well what do you think, Audre. What happened to you yesterday? And I would recite a poem and somewhere in that poem would be a line or a feeling I would be sharing. In other words, I literally communicated through poetry. And when I couldn't find the poems to express the things I was feeling, that's what started me writing poetry, and that was when I was twelve or thirteen." In high school, she saw her passion come further to life by participating in various poetry workshops, sponsored by the Harlem Writers Guild, despite feeling like an outcast. Her first poem was published by Seventeen magazine when she was still in high school.

After high school, Lorde went on to attend Hunter College from 1954 to 1959, graduating with a bachelor's degree in library science. Lorde then furthered her education at Columbia University, attaining a master's degree in library science in 1961.

During the 1960s, Lorde's career as a poet took off. Her work was published in many different works, including Langston Hughes's 1962 New Negro Poets, USA, in several foreign anthologies, and in black literary magazines. Her most famous poetic works include: The First Cities (1968), Cables to Rage, From A Land Where Other People Live (1973), New York Head Shop and Museum (1974), Coal (1976), and The Black Unicorn (1978). The Cancer Journals followed these works in 1980.

Lorde did not just identify with just one category, but many, wanting to celebrate all parts of herself equally. She was known to describe herself as black, lesbian, a mother, a warrior, and a poet. Her idea was that everyone is different from each other and it is the collective differences that make us who we are, instead of one thing. Focusing on all of the aspects of identity brings people together more than choosing one piece of an identity.

== Plot summary and chapters ==
The Cancer Journals is a very personal account and documentation of Lorde's battle with breast cancer. It examines the journey Lorde takes to integrate her experience with cancer into her identity. It consists of three parts with pieces from journal entries and essays written between 1977 and 1979.

The first chapter, "The Transformation of Silence into Language and Action", is derived from a speech that was given on December 28, 1977, at the Lesbian and Literature Panel of the Modern Language Association. In this talk, Lorde examines the difficulty of speaking out about such a personal subject. She assesses the risks of misunderstanding or even ridicule against the comfort of silence. Starting with an excerpt from her previous poetic work The Black Unicorn, Lorde calls on the reader to abolish silence and speak out.

The second chapter, "Breast Cancer: A Black Lesbian Feminist Experience", is a day-to-day account of her cancer experience, from biopsy to mastectomy. This chapter describes the emotions experienced by one without any close peers or role models through the course of diagnosis, surgery, and recovery. A primary focus of this section is Lorde's recognition of her intense need to survive, to be a warrior rather than a victim, and her acknowledgment of the network of women whose love sustained her. She also describes the benefit she had in talking about it with other lesbian cancer survivors. She also emphasizes her decision not to wear silicon breasts after her mastectomy operation.

In the third chapter, "Breast Cancer: Power vs. Prosthesis", Lorde describes her coming to terms with the results of and life after her mastectomy. This chapter centers around her decision not to wear a prosthesis after her double mastectomy. She explains that although it is a woman's choice as to whether or not she wants to wear a breast prosthesis, the options seems like "a cover-up in a society where women are solely judged by and reduced to their looks". She compares wearing breast prosthesis to an empty means for a woman to become adjusted to and accept her new body, thus claiming a new identity. Essentially, as described by Lorde, if a woman chooses to identify as a cancer survivor and then opts to use a prosthesis, she has begun to claim her altered body, and life. She describes this in the book: "Prosthesis offers the empty comfort of 'Nobody will know the difference.' But it is that very difference which I wish to affirm, because I have lived it, and survived it, and wish to share that strength with other women. If we are to translate the silence surrounding breast cancer into language and action against this scourge, then the first step is that women with mastectomies must become visible to each other."

Lorde touches on the counseling procedures that take place post-op via the American Cancer Society's Reach for Recovery Program and their encouragement and promotion of the breast prosthesis. She argues that the program, while doing work under the guise of "good" and "recovery", actually reinforced a kind of misogynist nostalgia. Lorde understands the "cosmetic" focus of the Reach for Recovery program as part of a general problem of sexism and racism. She also speaks of the possibilities of alternative medicine, arguing that women should be afforded the space to look at all options, and negotiate treatment and healing on their own terms.

== Feminist messages ==
The Cancer Journals touches on themes that were prominent in Lorde's life. In describing her identity as a multitude of labels, black, lesbian, feminist mother and poet, Lorde seeks to intertwine her battle with cancer into her identity. "I have cancer, I am a black feminist poet. How am I going to do this now?" she asks and seeks to answer through her writing. Lorde touches on feminist ideals when she combats the societal notion of what a woman should look like and what her body looks like post mastectomy. Lorde states "a kindly woman" attempted to give her "a soft sleep bra and a wad of lambswool pressed into a pale pink breast-shaped pad". The message is clear: the absent breast must be made up for somehow, such that Lorde's one-breasted deviation from the ideal female form is never visible. By embracing her one breast, Lorde avoids denial and persists beyond the impending victimization sick women receive. Lorde works to challenge the notion of femininity in cancer survivors.

== See also ==
Other prominent works by Audre Lorde include:

Sister Outsider: Essays and Speeches, a collection of essays in which Lorde focuses on the importance of communication between marginalized groups in society. In this work, Lorde pushes the idea of uniting these groups by finding common ground in their trials and tribulations.

Zami: A New Spelling of My Name (1982) is an biomythography in which Lorde delves into discovering her identity and self-awareness.
