= Coal (book) =

1976 collection of poetry by Audre Lorde

Coal is a collection of poetry by Audre Lorde, published in 1976. It was Lorde's first collection to be released by a major publisher. Lorde's poetry in Coal explored themes related to the several layers of her identity as a "Black, lesbian, mother, warrior, poet."

== Summary ==
Coal consists of five sections. While Audre Lorde presents poems that express each part of her identity, race undoubtedly plays a significant role in Coal. A major theme within the volume is Lorde's angry reaction towards racism. For Lorde, expressing anger was not destructive. Instead, Lorde transforms "rage at racism into triumphant self-assertion." She specifically dedicates the book "To the People of Sun, That We May All Better Understand." In addition, another significant part of the volume explores her existence as a lesbian, friend, and a former lover, specifically in the fourth section that consists of one long poem titled "Martha" that outlines the recovery of Lorde's former lover after a car accident.

=== Origin of the title ===
The volume's namesake comes from a poem in the first section titled "Coal". It is written in free-verse and first-person. The idea of an identity consisting of several layers is exemplified in this poem. One's true identity is often hidden behind several muddled layers. Lorde alludes toward this concept by her recurrent use of the dual imagery of a piece of coal and a diamond. As the speaker of the poem, Lorde begins by equating herself with a piece of coal.

=== Section I ===
The array of topics and nuances that are explored in Lorde's poems pertain to her own multifaceted-ness, signifying her status as "a self-styled "black, lesbian, mother, warrior, poet." The poem "Rites of Passage" shows as having a preoccupation with the male principle and with power. In it, she laments "their fathers are dying / whose deaths will not free them." This poem, as well as "Father Son and Holy Ghost", "Rooming Houses Are Old Women", and "The Woman Thing" show "attempts to unify [women] in this patriarchal society." Poems such as "Coal" and "Generation" showcase Lorde's position "as a visionary of a better world." The poem "Coal" is both autobiographical and allegorical in effect, as "she not only wrote for herself, but for her children and women as well." In the poem, Lorde's personal self-acceptance of her African American identity is meant to coalesce with the self-acceptance and the unification among all African American women, who Lorde hopes can find the "place of power within each of [themselves]" and "celebrate this womanly well of passion and creativity." Coal is a metaphor for Lorde's African American heritage. However it is "also associated with Eros and with creativity; she celebrated this source as what she called 'woman's place of power within each of us.'" The metamorphosis from coal into diamond represents Lorde's embracing of her identity, creativity and imagination, as "I am Black because I come from the earth's inside now take my word for jewel in the open light".

=== Section II ===
The second part of the collection appears to deal primarily with the theme of childhood. In "Now That I Am Forever With Child" Lorde uses nature as a descriptive metaphor of her pregnancy, giving it a pure and ethereal effect, as she describes the child as "blooming within [her]." In the poem Lorde hopes for her daughter to be a free and independent spirit, harkening back to Lorde's characteristic "as a visionary of a better world." In "What My Child Learns of the Sea" an association is further made between her child and the natural world. In "Story Books on a Kitchen Table", Lorde impressionistically recounts her own childhood and experiences with her negligent mother who "out of her womb of pain… spat me into her ill-fitting harness of despair." In "Poem for a Poet", the reader is given a glimpse of Lorde's own methods as a writer, and features a reference to poet Randall Jarrell.

=== Section III ===
Part three of the anthology consists of eleven poems. The poems in this section predominantly discuss Lorde's experiences as both a wife and a mother. In the poem "A Child Shall Lead" Lorde uses sensory imagery to express her concerns about her son and what will become of him in the future. Another poem "Paperweight" describes her frustrations with her heterosexual marriage. Throughout the poem, Lorde likens paper to something that can console her, because she uses it to write her poetry. The poem takes a dramatic turn in tone in the last stanza stating "or fold them [paper] all into a paper fan / with which to cool my husband's dinner."

=== Section IV ===
Part four contains a single poem in five sections entitled "Martha". The poem delves into the emotional torment Lorde experiences when her friend of many years was in the hospital, after experiencing severe brain trauma in a car accident. Although the poem is written entirely in Lorde's own voice, she also inserts some dialogue, including statements that Martha may or may not have said. Throughout the poem, Lorde offers her own views on life and death as she sits by Martha's side for what appears to be more than a couple of months. Audre remained a significant figure in Martha's family during her hospitalization, watching Martha's young children so Martha's husband could be with her at the hospital, and accompanying Martha's husband at their daughter's 6th grade graduation. The last line of the poem reads "You cannot get closer to death than this Martha / the nearest you've come to living yourself," leaving it unknown whether or not Martha actually dies. Martha did in fact survive the accident, and went on to lead a full, but diminished life with her family.

=== Section V ===
The fifth and final section of Lorde's volume primarily revolves around loss, mourning and commemoration. Lorde's personal reaction to unrequited love is an overwhelming theme in this section. There is a tone of sadness in all the poems. In "The Songless Lark", one of Lorde's shortest poems in the volume, the speaker mourns the departure of a loved one, declaring, "Sun shines so brightly on the hill / before you went away." Lorde seems to end the volume in a bleak tone. The second to last poem of the book, "Second Spring" begins, "We have no passions left to love the spring / who have suffered autumn as we did, alone" and finishes the poem with "while we stood still / racked on the autumn's weeping / binding cold love to us." Lorde's use of seasonal imagery seems to insinuate the passing of time, but there is a lack of growth and development in the poem. The speaker begins declaring that they have no passions left and ends standing in the cold.

== Critical responses ==
Coal received generally positive reviews from critics, especially among her peers and other female poets.

Black, lesbian, mother, urban woman: None of Lorde's selves has ever silenced the others; the counterpoint among them is often the material of her strongest poems.

— Marilyn Hacker

In poetry that is as compelling for its ethical vision as for its language, Lorde dares to imagine a changed world.

— San Francisco Chronicle

== See also ==
- Audre Lorde Project
- Black feminism
- African-American literature
