= Jennifer Christine Nash =

American gender studies and African American studies academic

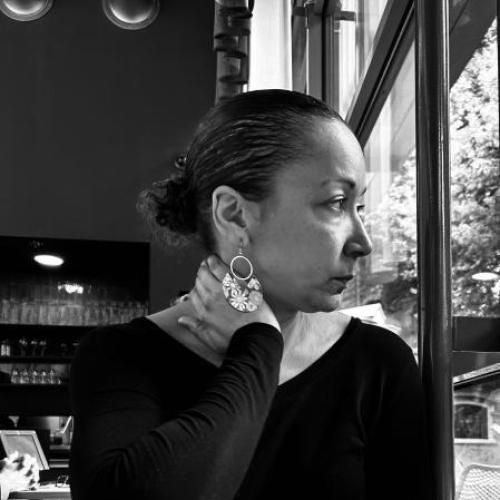
Jennifer Nash

Jennifer Christine Nash (born 1980) is the Jean Fox O'Barr Professor of Gender, Sexuality, and Feminist Studies at Duke University within its Trinity College of Arts and Sciences and Director of the Black Feminist Theory Summer Institute. In 2016, Nash arrived at Northwestern University, where she worked as an Associate Professor of African American Studies and Gender and Sexuality Studies before joining Duke University in 2020. Her research interests include Black feminist theory, feminist legal theory, Black sexual politics, black motherhood, black maternal health, race and law, and intersectionality.

== Education ==
Nash earned her PhD in African American Studies at Harvard University, her JD at Harvard Law School, and an AB in women's studies at Harvard College.

== Career ==
Nash is critical of approaches to intersectionality that demand either uncritical, unqualified support or outright rejection, calling instead for a critical engagement with the discursive formations produced under the heading of intersectionality. In particular, Nash has identified and problematized an emerging posture of territoriality and defensiveness characterizing some intersectionality discourses. This territorial posture objects to a critical regime created by and for Black women being "appropriated" for the struggles of other marginalized groups. Professor Nash sees this posture as a reiteration of a regime of territoriality, which threatens to make intersectionality into property to be defended and guarded despite black feminism's longstanding anticaptivity orientation, and the tradition's deep critiques of how logics of property enshrine boundaries and ensure that value is communicated exclusively through ownership.

== Selected publications ==
- How We Write Now: Living With Black Feminist Theory. Duke University Press, 2024.
- Birthing Black Mothers. Duke University Press, 2021.
- Black Feminism Reimagined: After Intersectionality. Duke University Press, 2018.
- The Black Body in Ecstasy: Reading Race, Reading Pornography. Duke University Press, 2014.

=== Edited publications ===
- Gender: Love. Macmillan Reference, 2016.
- The Routledge Companion to Intersectionalities. Routledge, 2023. Co-editor with Samantha Pinto
- Black Feminism on the Edge. Duke University Press, 2023. Co-editor with Samantha Pinto.

== Awards ==
- Alan Bray Memorial Book Prize. Awarded to The Black Body in Ecstasy: Reading Race, Reading Pornography by the GL/Q Caucus in the Modern Language Association.
- Gloria Anzaldúa Book Prize. Awarded to Black Feminism Reimagined After Intersectionality by the National Women's Studies Association.
- Honorable mention for Gloria Anzaldúa Book Prize. Awarded to Birthing Black Mothers by the National Women's Studies Association.
