= Zami: A New Spelling of My Name =

1982 book by Audre Lorde

- Cover
- Author: Audre Lorde
- Language: English
- Genre: Biomythography
- Published: 1982 (Persephone Press)
- Publication place: United States
- Media type: Print (Hardback & Paperback)
- ISBN: 0-89594-122-8
- OCLC: 18190883
- LC Class: PS3562.O75 Z23x 1982b

Zami: A New Spelling of My Name is a 1982 biomythography by American poet Audre Lorde. It started a new genre that the author calls biomythography, which combines history, biography, and myth. In the text, Lorde writes that "Zami" is "a Carriacou name for women who work together as friends and lovers", noting that Carriacou is the Caribbean island from which her mother emigrated. The name proves fitting: Lorde begins Zami writing that she owes her power and strength to the women in her life, and much of the book is devoted to detailed portraits of other women.

== Plot summary ==
Audre Lorde grows up in Harlem in the 1930s and 1940s, a child of Black West Indian parents. Lorde is legally blind from a very young age, isolating her even further from her surroundings and a family from which she does not receive much warmth or affection. Her two older sisters, Phyllis and Helen, are very close, but are rarely mentioned in Zami and Lorde spends little time with them. Her parents and other adults, especially her mother, discipline her harshly for insolence.

Lorde does not speak until age four, when she declares that she wants to read, and promptly follows through on this desire. She witnesses racism from a young age. The family's landlord hangs himself for having to rent his flat to Black people. When the family takes a trip to Washington, D.C., they are not allowed to eat ice cream at a lunch counter because of Jim Crow laws. Despite the rampant racism of this era that Lorde encountered in her daily life, her mother attempted to shield her from it. When white people spit at them during Lorde's childhood, her mother would disparage those low-class people for spitting into the wind.

After getting her first period at age 15, Lorde makes friends with a small number of non-Black girls at Hunter College High School, who label themselves "The Branded". She is elected literary editor of the school's arts magazine and begins writing poetry. After graduation, she leaves home and shares a flat with friends of Jean's (one of The Branded), ceasing contact with her parents and two sisters. At the same time, she also goes out with Peter, a white boy who jilts her on New Year's Eve after finding out she is pregnant. Lorde ultimately decides to get an abortion.

After some unhappy times at Hunter College, she moves to Stamford, Connecticut, to find work in a factory, where the working conditions prove atrocious. Following her father's death, she returns to New York and starts a relationship with Bea, whose heart she ends up breaking when she decides to move to Mexico to get away from McCarthyism. There, she goes to university and works as a secretary in a hospital. In Cuernavaca, she meets a lot of independent women, mostly lesbians; she has a relationship with one of them, Eudora, and works in a library. Back in New York, Lorde explores the lesbian bar scene, moves in with lover, Muriel. Another woman, Lynn, moves in with them and ends up leaving without warning and steals their savings. Finally, Lorde begins a relationship with a mother named Afrekete, who decides to leave to tend to her child. The book ends on a homage to Lorde's mother.

== Characters ==
- Audre Lorde, the author
- Linda Lorde, Audre's mother. She knows patois. She prepares lunch for the Dad. Each child is asked once or twice a year which dish they would like her to prepare for dinner. The Dad keeps his distance, unless the Mom is in any way disrespected or talked back to, and then he will jump in. She is always longing for "home", the island community she emigrated from. She is able to obtain work as a cleaner, but only because she is light enough to pass as Spanish. When the employer finds out she is black, she is fired. She outlives her husband. She refuses the free milk given to poor families.
- Phyllis and Helen, Audre's older sisters
- The Branded, Audre's friends at high school
- Maxine, Audre's Jewish friend at high school
- Gennie, a.k.a. Genevieve, Audre's closest friend in high school who takes dance classes and commits suicide. The first person she consciously, truly loves.
- Louisa, Gennie's mother
- Philip Thompson, Gennie's father who left home early and comes back when she is 15
- Ella, Gennie's stepmother
- Peter, a white boy whom Audre dates in New York
- Ginger, Audre's colleague from the factory at Stamford; Audre's first female lover. Audre later moved in with Ginger and her Mom, and paid rent for room and board.
- Bea, Audre's lover, met in New York. Only dated each other because of the mutual fact they were gay. They were supposed to go to Mexico together, but Audre stood her up when she realized it would be a bad idea to go together. With Bea, Audre did all the work, and Bea wasn't that responsive. They commuted back and forth from Philadelphia to see each other.
- Eudora, an older woman and Audre's lover in Mexico. She was a journalist and alcoholic. She was passionate about Mexican culture and history. She had a clothing shop with her ex in the Mexican town where they lived. She had lost a breast due to cancer.
- Muriel, Audre's lover. Her first long-term committed relationship. Muriel moves in with Audre. Muriel has been diagnosed with schizophrenia and has undergone electroshock therapy. Audre supports Muriel financially. Ginger introduced Muriel to Audre, as Muriel held the same job at the Stamford factory before Audre did.
- Rhea, Audre's roommate in New York after returning from Mexico. A straight white woman whose political work was jeopardized by living with a black lesbian, she leaves for Chicago in order to keep her job under the pretense of starting a new life after the demise of a relationship, but Audre does not know this at the time. Audre also lived with Rhea before going to Mexico. Rhea never has satisfying romantic relationships and wonders longingly at the love Muriel and Audre are experiencing at the beginning of their relationship.
- Felicia, a.k.a. "Flee", a black lesbian who has a close but platonic relationship with Audre
- Lynn, a lesbian who lives with Muriel and Audre for a while and is their mutual lover during this time
- Toni, Audre's old acquaintance from high school, who turns out a lesbian
- Gerri, a black lesbian from Queens. Gerri and her partner are known for their wonderful parties, which have abundant food, in contrast to the Upper West Side parties which do not have much food and are much more uptight.
- Kitty, a.k.a. Afrekete, the last lover mentioned in the book, met through Gerri; she has a daughter and leaves abruptly back to Atlanta to visit her Mom and daughter. Lorde never sees her again, but mentions Kitty will always be part of her.

== Major themes ==
- Lesbianism – The book describes the way lesbians lived in New York City, Connecticut and Mexico during the 1950s through 1970s.
- Racism – The landlord who hangs himself, the ice-cream episode in Washington, D.C., and the increased suspicion during the McCarthy era all contribute to highlight the theme of racism.
- The mother – Lorde's difficult relationship with her mother, whom she credits for imbuing her with a certain sense of strength, pervades throughout the book.
- McCarthyism and the Rosenbergs are also mentioned.

== Critical reception ==
On November 5, 2019, the BBC News listed Zami: A New Spelling of My Name on its list of the 100 most influential novels.
