= Sister Outsider =

1984 collection of essays and speeches by Audre Lorde

Sister Outsider: Essays and Speeches
- First edition cover
- Author: Audre Lorde
- Language: English
- Subject: Black Feminism
- Publisher: Crossing Press
- Publication date: 1984
- Publication place: United States
- Media type: Print
- Pages: 192
- ISBN: 978-1580911863

Sister Outsider: Essays and Speeches is a collection of essential essays and speeches written by Audre Lorde, a writer who focuses on the particulars of her identity: Black woman, lesbian, poet, activist, cancer survivor, mother, and feminist. This collection, now considered a classic volume of Lorde's most influential works of non-fiction prose, has had a groundbreaking impact in the development of contemporary feminist theories.

In fifteen essays and speeches dating from 1976 to 1984, Lorde explores the complexities of intersectional identity, while explicitly drawing from her personal experiences of oppression to include sexism, heterosexism, racism, homophobia, classism, and ageism. The book examines a broad range of topics, including love, self-love, war, imperialism, police brutality, coalition building, violence against women, Black feminism, and movements towards equality that recognize and embrace differences as a vehicle for change. With meditative conscious reasoning, Lorde explores her misgivings for the widespread marginalization deeply-rooted in the United States' white patriarchal system, all the while, offering messages of hope. The essays in this landmark collection are extensively taught and have become a widespread area of academic analysis. Lorde's philosophical reasoning that recognizes oppressions as complex and interlocking designates her work as a significant contribution to critical social theory.

== Themes ==
The paradoxical title of Sister Outsider expresses Lorde's commitment to her identity and the multiplicities gathering together to assemble her unique identity – multiplicities that often placed her "on the line", in a space that refused safety of an inside parameter, demonstrating Lorde's ability to embrace difficulty in the path to create change. Lorde informs readers through these essays that the histories of westernized culture have conditioned inhabitants to view "human differences in simplistic opposition to each other" – good/bad, superior/inferior – and to always be suspicious of the latter. Instead, Lorde suggests, use differences as a catalyst for change. Throughout the collection, Lorde also emphasizes the use of poetry as a profound form of knowledge, a powerful tool for diagnosing and challenging power relations within a racist, patriarchal society.

In this charged collection, Lorde challenges sexism, racism, ageism, homophobia, and classism with determination. She propounds the recognition of difference as an empowering vehicle for action and creative change and emphasizes the necessity for applying these concepts to the next generation of feminism - a response to the current lacking thereof between women in the mainstream feminist movement. Lorde also explores the fear and suspicion that arises among African American men and women, lesbians, feminists, and white women that ultimately creates an isolating experience for African American women – constructing a social institution that dehumanizes lives. Throughout these essays, Lorde confronts this problem of institutional dehumanization plaguing American culture during the late 1970s and early 1980s, and provides with philosophical reasoning, messages of hope.

=== The erotic vs. The pornographic ===
In Sister Outsider, Lorde tasks herself with discerning the difference and meaning of the erotic and the pornographic. This is all within the context of sexuality, power dynamics, and queerness. As Lorde says in her text, "the erotic offers a well of replenishing and provocative force to the woman who does not fear its revelation, nor succumb to the belief that sensation is enough". We see here that Lorde draws our attention to the emotional experience of sexuality, and defines the erotic in a way that disconnects the typical male dominated interpretation. She continues to separate the erotic and pornographic by conveying the effect of power between the two. "But pornography is a direct denial of the power of the erotic, for it represents the suppression of true feeling. Pornography emphasizes sensation without feeling". After defining these two terms she relates them to her own identity as a Black lesbian feminist. The erotic in her eyes is not simply a physical experience or drive, it is a show of resilience in the face of a racist, patriarchal, and homophobic society.

== Publication ==
Lorde signed a contract with The Crossing Press on November 19, 1982 with a projected publication date of May 31, 1984. She was the first major lesbian author the press was to sign, despite the firm's policy of not taking books represented by agents. Lorde expressed to her agent that she felt rushed into signing the contract that provided an advance against royalties of a mere $100. The book was ultimately a huge financial success for the firm. It was republished in 2007 by The Crossing Press with a new forward provided by scholar and essayist, Cheryl Clarke.

== Content ==
The book is composed of essays and talks by Lorde, including the following:

- "Notes from a Trip to Russia;" edited journal entries from Lorde's two-week trip to Russia in 1976, as invited American observer to the African-Asian Writers conference sponsored by the Union of Soviet Writers.
- "Poetry is Not a Luxury;" first published first in Chrysalis: A Magazine of Female Culture, no. 3 in 1977. It asserts that poetry is a valuable tool for social and personal interrogation and transformation, and acts as a bridge from unnamed feelings to words to action.
- "The Transformation of Silence into Language and Action;" talk delivered at the Modern Language Association's "Lesbian Literature Panel" in Chicago, Illinois, December 28, 1977. It was also published in Sinister Wisdom in 1978 and The Cancer Journals (Spinsters, Ink, San Francisco) in 1980. "Transformation" examines the factors that contribute to the silence of some and the actions of others, commenting on voice, power, violence, sexism, verbal abuse, shame, and hostile social environments. The talk draws from Lorde's marginalized positionalities and experiences with breast cancer.
- "Scratching the Surface: Some Notes on Barriers to Women and Loving;" first published in The Black Scholar, in 1978. It discusses distrust and hostility within relationships between black women and black men and women.
- "Uses of the Erotic: The Erotic as Power;" delivered at the Fourth Berkshire Conference on the History of Women at Mount Holyoke College on August 25, 1978. It was first published as a pamphlet by Out & Out Books, and later by Kore Press. Lorde uses this essay to posit the erotic as an emotionally charged mode of perception to inform new ways of understanding experience.
- "Sexism: An American Disease in Blackface;" first published as "The Great American Disease" in the May–June issue of The Black Scholar in 1979. "Sexism" was written in response to "The Myth of Black Macho: A Response to Angry Black Feminists" by Robert Staples in a previous issue of The Black Scholar. It articulates the threat patriarchal hegemonic masculinity poses to Black men and women and respect and solidarity within the Black community.
- "An Open Letter to Mary Daly;" a letter in response to Daly's Gyn/Ecology, challenging her exclusion of women of color and white feminism in general.
- "Man Child: A Black Lesbian Feminist's Response;" first published in Conditions: Four in 1979. It discusses the challenges of raising a son as a lesbian mother in an interracial relationship in the United States.
- "An Interview: Audre Lorde and Adrienne Rich;" was first published in Signs in the summer of 1981. It is edited from three hours of audio tapes recorded on August 30, 1979, in Montague, Massachusetts. The interview was commissioned by Marilyn Hacker, guest editor of Woman Poet: The East.
- "The Master's Tools Will Never Dismantle the Master's House;" developed from comments at "The Personal and the Political Panel" at the Second Sex Conference on October 29, 1979, in New York. It includes comments on how practices of exclusion, absence, invisibility, silence, and tokenism within feminist theory discredit feminism and calls for a transformation of the use of power and difference between women.
- "Age, Race, Class, and Sex: Women Redefining Difference;" a paper delivered at the Copeland Colloquium at Amherst College in April 1980. The paper rejects difference as a source of domination, and reclaims differences between individuals and communities as resources for creative social change.
- "The Uses of Anger: Women Responding to Racism;" was a keynote presentation at the National Women's Studies Association Conference in Storrs, Connecticut, in June 1981. It addresses the experiences of women of color within sexist, homophobic societies in relation to the systems that try to deny and blame oppressed communities for their anger.
- "Learning from the 60s;" from a talk delivered at Harvard University in February 1982 for Malcolm X Weekend. It challenges readers to analyze how their practices reflect their ideologies and stresses the importance of working towards mutual liberation from multiple systems of oppression.
- "Eye to Eye: Black Women, Hatred, and Anger;" an abbreviated version was first published in essence, vol. 14, no. 6 in October 1983. It describes Lorde's early experiences with negative white reactions to her Blackness and conveys the harmful impacts of internalized racism and sexism on self-esteem and relationships between Black women.
- "Grenada Revisited: An Interim Report;" written while book was typeset, as a final-hour inclusion. The essay recounts the condition of Grenada from her visit there after its invasion by the United States. It also serves as a critique of United States imperialist neocolonial foreign policy.

== Impact ==
Sister Outsider is a groundbreaking essential contribution to Black feminism, Postcolonial feminism, gay and lesbian studies, critical psychology, black queer studies, African American studies, and feminist thought at large. The canonical work has been cited by renowned scholars like Patricia Hill Collins, Donna Haraway, and Sara Ahmed. The publication was met with overall "resounding praise". A reviewer for Publishers Weekly referred to the work as "an eye-opener". American author Barbara Christian called the collection, "another indication of the depth of analysis that black women writers are contributing to feminist thought." From this work, Lorde is said to have created a new critical social theory that understands oppressions as overlapping and interlocking, informed from her position as an outsider. She presented her arguments in an accessible manner that provided readers with the language to articulate differences and the complex nature of oppression. American professor and theorist Roderick Ferguson cites Sister Outsider as a critical influence in his book, Aberrations in Black, in which he coins the term Queer of Color Critique.

Sister Outsider received a critical reception, as well, as the collection challenges readers' unacknowledged privileges and complicity in oppression. Negative reviewers tended to focus on how Sister Outsider caused them discomfort with confronting their guilt as individuals whose identities occupy dominant positions within the United States, specifically through whiteness, maleness, youth, thinness, heterosexuality, Christianity, and financial security. While some reviewers claimed that the work is hard to identify with if they are not similar to Lorde, others refute this, claiming that Lorde uses a "flexible model of subject positioning" that allows readers of various backgrounds to determine points of similarity and difference, challenging their standard notions of selfhood and subjectivity.

In The Man Question, Kathy Ferguson questions Lorde's employment of what she defines as "Cosmic Feminism", a feminism that relies on a feminine primitivism and values feelings that are more intense and seemingly deep-rooted.
