= Thierno =

Thierno is a given name. Notable people with the name include:

- Thierno Aliou (c. 1850–1927), Fula author
- Thierno Bah, multiple people
- Thierno Baldé (born 2002), French footballer
- Thierno Ballo (born 2002), Ivorian footballer
- Thierno Barry (footballer, born 2000), Guinean footballer
- Thierno Barry (footballer, born 2002), French footballer
- Thierno Diallo (born 2000), Guinean artistic gymnast
- Thierno Aliou Diallo, Guinean politician
- Thierno Diawo (c. 1900–1984), Guinean poet
- Thierno Gaye (born 1999), Senegalese footballer
- Thierno Niang (born 1990), Senegalese basketball player
- Thierno Niang (footballer) (born 1992), Senegalese footballer
- Thierno Faty Sow (1941–2009), Senegalese filmmaker
- Thierno Thioub (born 1998), Senegalese footballer
- Thierno Hady Boubacar Thiam (died 2017), Malian Muslim scholar
- Thierno Youm (born 1960), Senegalese footballer
- Mamadou Thierno Barry (born 2005), Senegalese footballer
