= La Parole aux négresses =

1978 book by Awa Thiam

La Parole aux Négresses
- Author: Awa Thiam
- Language: French
- Subject: Black feminism
- Publisher: Éditions Denoël
- Publication date: 1978
- Publication place: France
- Media type: Print
- Pages: 189

La Parole aux négresses is a founding book of Francophone African feminism by Awa Thiam published in 1978 with a foreword by Benoîte Groult. It is considered a founding essay of intersectionality exposing the specificity of black women's feminism in the feminist movement from a francophone point of view. It is composed of interviews giving voices to the concerned black women.

The book was translated in English in 1986 under the title Black Sisters, Speak Out: Feminism and Oppression in Black Africa ,

== Context ==
Awa Thiam was the first feminist to formulate in 1978 the complexity of the position of francophone black women in the feminist movement, producing the first theoretical grounds for intersectionality. The essay Ain't I a Woman? by bell hooks written in English, was published in 1981 and Kimberlé Williams Crenshaw did not popularize the concept of intersectionality until 1989.

Awa Thiam explains that black women suffer from several oppressions simultaneously and the specific problems they face are not addressed within the white and western feminist movement.

== Structure and themes of the book ==
The book consists of a series of interviews with African women with a foreword by Benoite Groult.

The first part of the book, Les Mots des négresses (The Words of the Négresses), deals with the need for African women to use their own words to describe their experiences, so that they are no longer "described by others," especially by the men in their families who decide about their lives and are not inclined to let them speak for themselves.

The second part, titled Les Maux des négresses (literally ills of the black women), lists the various problems faced by African women: female genital mutilation (FGM), such as clitoridectomy and infibulation, illiteracy, teenage pregnancy, polygamy, forced marriage and the influence of religion.

Awa Thiam then questions, in the section Feminisms and Revolution, the true emancipatory power of Western feminism and its relationship with women's struggles in Africa. She draws up an inventory of the situation and concludes: the struggles of African women are not the same as those of their Western colleagues:

Where the European woman complains of being doubly oppressed, the Negress is oppressed threefold. Oppression by her gender, by her class, and by her race. Sexism - Racism - Existence of social classes (capitalism, colonialism or neo-colonialism).

According to her African women must fight for their rights themselves and be wary of white feminists trying to provide help only by "fixing African women", an attitude that she describes as yet another form of colonialism:

People who understand nothing of ritual practices must beware of attacking them, especially when they base their judgment on criteria that bear no relationship to the mentalities of people in the society under consideration. The women of Black Africa have suffered enough from these colonial and neo-colonial attitudes.

She concludes with the need for African women to bring their own claims through writing and speech, so that they can no longer be confiscated. She also argues for a sisterhood between African feminism and white Western feminism. In the last part of the book, she outlines possible courses of action, which involves independent speech and preparation to fight for emancipation:

In other words, we would say that it is not a speed race, but a long distance race. Let women arm themselves accordingly to carry it out.

== Reception and impact ==
Her book is considered a founding book of Francophone black feminism. The book had a huge impact on the issue of female genital mutilation (FGM) a topic that it addressed in depth. It is the first of its kind to hold interviews of survivors and calling for change. It also describes the implication of a patriarcal system, which leads violence against women performed by women :

it would seem that males have forced women to become their own torturers, to butcher each other.

After the publishing of the book, Awa Thiam became a founding member of the Commission for the Abolition of Sexual Mutilation, and then Minister of Health and Social Action in Senegal following the publication of her book. The book was translated into English in 1986 under the title Speak out, Black sisters, Feminism and oppression in Black Africa.

Following the publication of the book, a call for testimonies and statements by African women, many women authors began to write using the first person in their stories and fictions. They also took up subjects considered taboo: Okouassai ou mal de mère by Kakou Okloomi addresses the issue of sterility, Le Baobab fou (1984) by Ken Bugul, addresses prostitution, Fureurs et cris de femmes by Angèle Rawiri miscarriages and also female homosexuality. La voix du salut by Aminata Maiga Ka deals with polygamy, as does Une si longue lettre by Mariama Bâ published in 1979.

== Bibliography ==
- Mianda, Gertrude Mutonkoley (2014). "Reading Awa Thiam's La parole aux Négresses through the lens of Feminisms and Hegemony of English language". Atlantis: Critical Studies in Gender, Culture & Social Justice. 36 (2): 8–19. ISSN 1715-0698..
- Léger, Danièle (1981). "Thiam (Awa) La Parole aux négresses". Archives de sciences sociales des religions. 51 (2): 295.

== See also ==
- Sojourner Truth
- Ain't I a Woman
- Intersectionality
- Black feminism
