= Love Trilogy (bell hooks) =

Series by bell hooks

The Love Trilogy is a series by American author bell hooks. The first book, All About Love: New Visions was published in 2000, and was followed by Salvation: Black People and Love (2001) and Communion: The Female Search for Love (2002).

== All About Love: New Visions ==
All About Love: New Visions was published in 2000. It became a New York Times bestseller in 2021, over two decades after its initial publication, and maintained increased sales, selling more than 170,000 copies in 2023, compared to 27,000 copies in 2018.

The book has 13 chapters, each analysing love in a different context. hooks argued for readers to rethink the idea of love by rejecting the notion of "dangerous narcissism" and instead thinking of love as community. Critics have described the book as a merge between a self-help book and a moral philosophy book, calling for critical thinking about the world's social and political motives.

== Salvation: Black People and Love ==
The second book of the trilogy, Salvation: Black People and Love, was published in 2001, examining love within the lives of African Americans from a historical and cultural perspective. The book covers relationships and marriages, poetry from Black leaders like Maya Angelou and James Baldwin, hip-hop culture, and thoughts from W. E. B. Du Bois.

Salvation aims to explain how love works as social justice in African American lives, discussing gender roles within the Black community. Some critics questioned hooks' approach, while others appreciated the work's engagement with cultural references. According to reviewers, the book was written to urge the African American community to reflect on certain behavior within the community, with the goal to stimulate healthy discussion about what healthy love looks like in the Black community.

== Communion: The Female Search for Love ==
The last book of the trilogy, Communion: The Female Search for Love, was published in 2002, examines women's perceptions of love, particularly in the context of feminist movements. hooks discusses how these movements influenced women's roles in the workforce and increased the levels of self-help.

According to one reviewer, the book challenges sexist ways of thinking about the body and love in a literal and figurative sense, and hooks seeks to use feminist logic to create healthy discussions about love.

== Publications ==
- bell hooks, All about love: new visions (2000). Published by William Morrow. ISBN 978-0-688-16844-5
- bell hooks, Salvation: Black People and Love (2001). Published by HarperCollins. ISBN 978-0-06-095949-4
- bell hooks, Communion: the female search for love (2002). Published by William Morrow. ISBN 978-0-06-093829-1
