= Cultural feminism =

Theories that commend innate differences between women and men

Cultural feminism is a variety of feminism that attempts to revalue and redefine attributes culturally ascribed to femaleness. The term cultural feminism is also used to describe theories that commend innate differences between women and men.

Cultural feminists diverged from radical feminism when they rejected the problematization of femininity and returned to an essentialist view of gender differences in which they regard female nature as superior.

== History ==
Unlike radical or socialist feminism, cultural feminism was not an ideology widely claimed by proponents but was more commonly a pejorative label ascribed by its opponents. The term had surfaced as early as 1971, when Frances Chapman, in a letter printed in Off Our Backs, condemned the literary magazine Aphra as having "served the cause of cultural feminism". In 1972, socialist feminist Elizabeth Diggs, used the label "cultural feminism" to apply to all of radical feminism. Brooke Williams was the first to describe the "depoliticization of radical feminism" as "cultural feminism" in 1975.

"Though cultural feminism came out of the radical feminist movement," said Ellen Willis, co-founder of Redstockings, "the premises of the two tendencies are antithetical." However, there are scholars such as Rosemarie Tong who conceptualize cultural feminism as a perspective within radical feminism.

== Theory ==
Cultural feminism places women in a position overdetermined by patriarchal systems. Linda Alcoff makes the point that "the cultural feminist reappraisal construes woman's passivity as her peacefulness, her sentimentality as her proclivity to nurture, her subjectiveness as her advanced self-awareness".

Similar lines of thought have been traced to earlier periods. Jane Addams and Charlotte Perkins Gilman argued that in governing the state, cooperation, caring, and nonviolence in the settlement of conflicts society seem to be what was needed from women's virtues. Josephine Donovan argues that the nineteenth-century journalist, critic, and women's rights activist, Margaret Fuller, initiated cultural feminism in Woman in the Nineteenth Century (1845). She stressed the emotional, intuitive side of knowledge and expressed an organic worldview that is quite different from the mechanistic view of Enlightenment rationalists.

However, it was Alice Echols' article, "Cultural Feminism: Feminist Capitalism and the Anti-Pornography Movement", that led to the widespread adoption of the term to describe contemporary feminists, not their historical antecedents. According to Echols, cultural feminism "equates women's liberation with the development and preservation of a female counterculture". Her examples of cultural feminists are Kathleen Barry, Susan Brownmiller, Mary Daly, Andrea Dworkin, Susan Griffin, Robin Morgan, Janice Raymond, Adrienne Rich, and Florence Rush. Feminists involved with feminist separatism, lesbian feminism, and the women in print movement came to be associated with cultural feminism because of their focus on creating woman-focused cultures and economies, which Echols has characterized as retreating from patriarchy instead of dismantling it.

Mary Daly linked "female energy", or her term Gyn/Ecology, to the female "life-affirming, life-creating biological condition" that is victimized by male aggression as a result of "male barrenness". Adrienne Rich asserts that female biology has "radical" potential that has been suppressed by its reduction by men. Some cultural feminists desired the separation of women-only, women-run centers and spaces to "challenge negative gendered constructions". This form of separatism within cultural feminism was criticized for ignoring structural patriarchy to instead blame men as individuals for women's oppression. In addition to physical separation, cultural feminists called for "separation from male values".

Women are identified as the most important and most marginalized group. Daly asserted that other categories of identity, including ethnicity and class are male-defined groups, and women who identify them are being divided from other women. Rich declares the "social burden" placed on women is greater and more complex than even the burden of slavery.

Motherhood and child-bearing is another popular topic in cultural feminist theory. Rich theorized motherhood as an institution, constructed to control women, which is different from authentic, natural motherhood. Cultural feminists declare the relationship between mother and daughter, and therefore all women, has been destroyed by patriarchy and must be repaired.

In a study of second-wave feminist theory, Carol Anne Douglas (long-time critic at Off Our Backs) included the influence of Susan Griffin's popular book Woman and Nature: The Roaring Inside Her as central to the development of this strain of theory. Notably, this chapter of Douglas' book is titled Male biology as a problem and the analysis of Griffin's ideas is subtitled Woman the Natural.

== Criticisms ==
Ethnographer Kristen Ghodsee describes several forms of criticism coming from women of color and women of developing countries, who believe that "the idea of a global sisterhood erases important differences in power and access to resources among women of varying races, ethnicities, and nationalities". A common concern, particularly among women of color and women of developing countries, is that cultural feminism only includes white, upper-class women, instead of taking into account women of different color and status. This concern is reflected by Audre Lorde in "An Open Letter to Mary Daly", in which Lorde expresses disappointment that Daly excluded the heritage and herstories of Lorde and other non-European women in her cultural feminist book, while selectively using non-European women's words out of context to prove her points and to describe "female victimization".

Another concern is the belief that cultural feminists "have not challenged the defining of woman but only the definition given by men" and therefore perpetuate gender essentialism When cultural feminists claim issues like patriarchy and rape are inherent products of male biology and behavior, the opportunity to critique and challenge the structures behind these issues disappears. Furthermore, essentialist definitions of "woman" reinforce the oppressive requirement for women to live up to "an innate 'womanhood' they will be judged by". Alice Echols stated that cultural feminists believe in order to combat "male lasciviousness", women should demand respect by repressing their sexualities and proposing a conservative "female standard of sexuality". She critiques this concept for attempting to control women's sexual expression to hold women responsible for perceived problems with male sexuality.

This biological determinism also reflects on cultural feminists' opinions of transgender women. Echols describes cultural feminist attribution of transgender women to male rapaciousness as inappropriate and explains that cultural feminists dislike transgender women for accusations that they "undermine the salience of gender, and erase the boundaries between genders", appropriate the female body (which cultural feminists regard as a kind of rape), and threaten to bring the "residual heterosexuality" out of lesbians in lesbian-feminist spaces. Trans-exclusionary radical feminism is said to have its origins in cultural feminism.

Cultural feminism has also been criticized for engaging in capitalism, a practice which some feminists consider contradictory to feminist values and counterproductive to the feminist movement. To highlight problems with feminist capitalism, Echols analyzed the implementation, practices, and outcomes of the Feminist Economic Network (FEN), a feminist business that intended to use capitalism to help women overcome patriarchal barriers by lending money from feminist credit unions to feminist-owned businesses. She found the network exploited employees, rejected democracy, collectivity, and accountability, and justified hierarchies of power within the business by claiming sisterhood ensures that individual empowerment leads to collective empowerment for women. Echols's findings can be expanded upon by a critique of cultural feminist business practices in Off Our Backs. The authors explain that the "feminist" businesses cultural feminists advocate for depoliticize feminism, are inherently hierarchal, have minimal access to political economic influence, and are implicitly reformist. Additionally, the authors point out the flaws in cultural feminists' attempts to counter oppression through membership in an oppressive economic system, use of bootstrap theory, and turning feminism into both a commodity and market which ultimately serves "male" capitalism.

Verta Taylor and Leila J. Rupp have argued that critiques of cultural feminism are often an attack on lesbian feminism. Suzanne Staggenbourg's case study of Bloomington, Indiana led her to conclude that engagement in activities labeled as cultural feminist "provides little evidence that cultural feminism led to a decline in political activity in the women's movement".

== See also ==
- Appeal to nature
- Difference feminism
- Ecofeminism
- Female chauvinism
- Feminist metaphysics
- Feminist sex wars
- Gender essentialism
- New feminism
- Political lesbianism
- TERFism
