= Sirah Baldé =

Guinean novelist and teacher

- Born: Sirah Baldé de Labé; 1929; Labé, Guinea
- Died: 2018 (aged 88–89); Conakry, Guinea
- Occupations: Novelist; teacher

Sirah Baldé de Labé (1929–2018) was a Guinean novelist and teacher.

Baldé was born in Labé in 1929. She studied to be a teacher in Rufisque, Senegal and has said that she was the first woman to teach French in the former kingdom of Fula, Imamate of Futa Jallon, during the French occupation.

Baldé is best known for her 1985 novel D'un Fouta-Djalloo à l'autre (From One Futa Jalon to the Other), published by La Pensée Universelle. The work was a four-volume family saga set in the 18th century and featuring themes of tribal war. She appeared on the Guinean television programme Papier plume Parole in 1986 to speak about the work. Like other novels authored by French-speaking African women writers (such as Awa Thiam and Henriette Diabaté) from the same period, it is written in the first person in the style of an autobiography. The scholar Jean-Marie Volet noted in 2008 that the book is "almost impossible to find", but that Baldé's writing as a pioneer of French education "is most important".

She died in 2018 at Conakry, and was buried at Labé.
