= ENI of Labé =

Public general education institution in Labé, Guinea

- Ecole normale des instituteurs de Labé
- Type: Public institution
- Affiliation: University of Labé
- Director: Diallo Hassimiou
- Location: Labé, Guinea; 11.7614835°N 12.0118889°W
- Language: French

The ENI of Labé or École normale des instituteurs de Labé is a public general education institution in Guinea, located in Kouroula1 in the prefecture of Labé, in the northern part of the country.

It is under the supervision of the Ministry of Higher Education and Scientific Research.

== Location ==
ENI of Labé is located in Kouroula1, a district in the city of Labé. It consists of buildings for classrooms and one for the administration of the institution.

== Programs ==
The IST of Labé offers only the general education program.

== See also ==
- University of Labé
- University General Lansana Conté of Sonfonia
- University of Kindia
