= Verta =

Verta may refer to

- Ofer Verta, Israeli footballer
- Verta Taylor, academic sociologist
- Vega Research and Technology Accompaniment, see Vega (rocket)
