= The Feminine Mystique =

1963 book by Betty Friedan

- First edition with a quote from Virgilia Peterson
- Author: Betty Friedan
- Language: English
- Subject: Feminism
- Publisher: W. W. Norton
- Publication date: February 19, 1963
- Publication place: United States
- Media type: Print (Hardcover and Paperback)
- Pages: 239
- ISBN: 0-393-32257-2
- Dewey Decimal: 305.420973
- LC Class: HQ1420 .F7

The Feminine Mystique is a book by American author Betty Friedan, widely credited with sparking second-wave feminism in the United States. First published by W. W. Norton on February 19, 1963, The Feminine Mystique became a bestseller, initially selling over a million copies. Friedan used the book to challenge the widely shared belief that "fulfillment as a woman had only one definition for American women after 1949—the housewife-mother."

In 1957, Friedan was asked to conduct a survey of her former Smith College classmates for their 15th anniversary reunion; the results, in which she found that many of them were unhappy with their lives as housewives, prompted her to begin research for The Feminine Mystique, conducting interviews with other suburban housewives, as well as researching psychology, media, and advertising. The book faced criticism for focusing primarily on the experiences of white, middle-class women and overlooking the perspectives of women of color and working-class women. Friedan originally intended to create an article on the topic, not a book, but no magazine would publish the work.

Friedan coined the phrase "feminine mystique" to describe the assumptions that women would be fulfilled from their housework, marriage, sexual lives, and children. The prevailing belief was that women who were truly feminine should not want to work, get an education, or have political opinions. Friedan wanted to prove that women were unsatisfied and could not voice their feelings.

== Synopsis ==
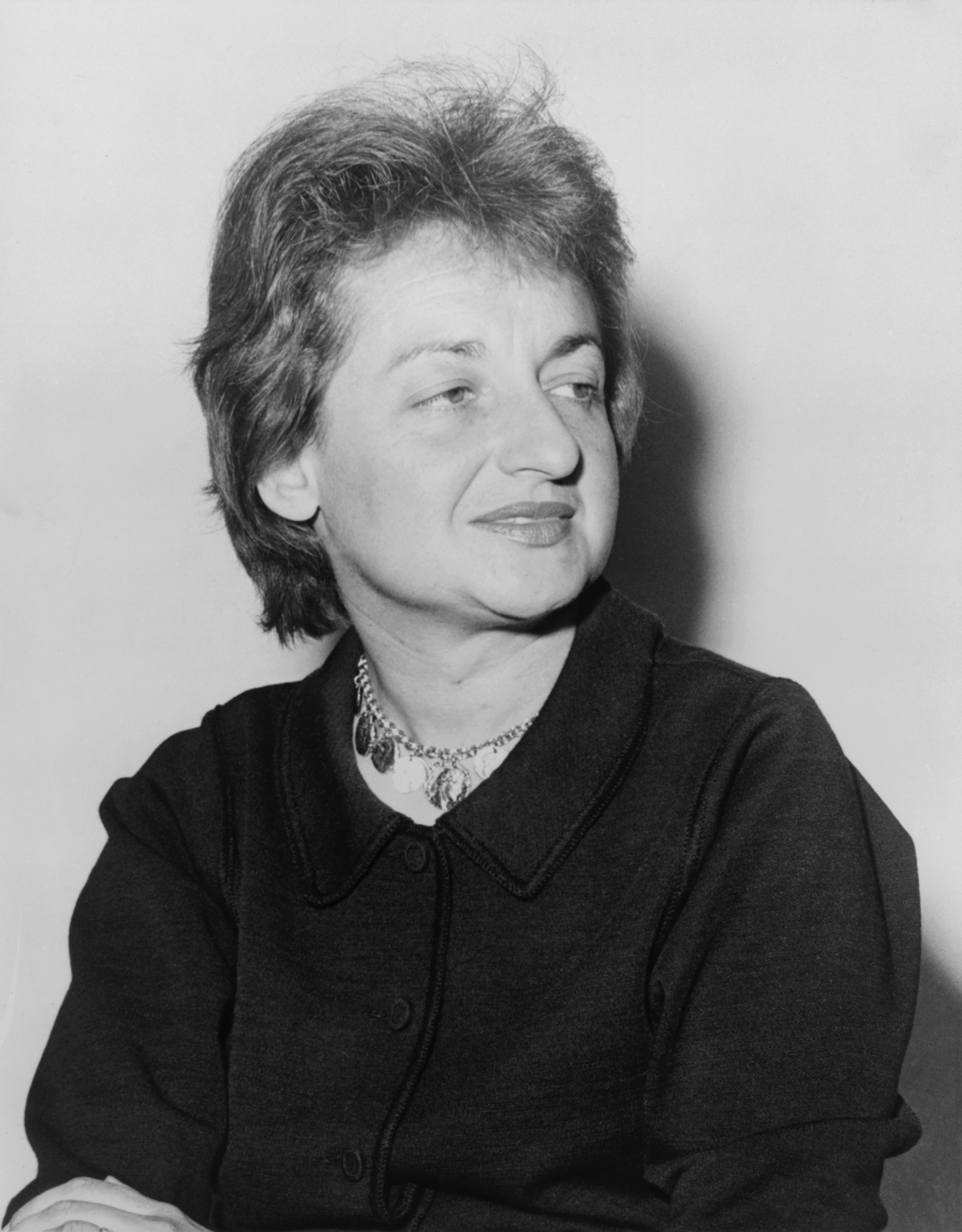
Betty Friedan in 1960

The Feminine Mystique begins with an introduction describing what Friedan called "the problem that has no name"—the widespread unhappiness of women in the 1950s and early 1960s. She discusses the lives of several housewives from around the United States who were unhappy despite living in material comfort and being married with children. Friedan also questions the women's magazine, women's education system, and advertisers for creating this widespread image of women. The detrimental effects induced by this image were that it cornered women into the domestic sphere, and that it led many women to lose their own identities.

Chapter 1: Friedan points out that the average age of marriage was dropping, the portion of women attending college was decreasing and the birthrate was increasing for women throughout the 1950s, yet the widespread trend of unhappy women persisted, although American culture insisted that fulfillment for women could be found in marriage and housewifery. Although aware of and sharing this dissatisfaction, women in the 1950s misinterpreted it as an individual problem and rarely talked about it with other women. As Friedan pointed out, "part of the strange newness of the problem is that it cannot be understood in terms of the age-old material problems of man: poverty, sickness, hunger, cold." This chapter concludes by declaring: "We can no longer ignore that voice within women that says: 'I want something more than my husband and my children and my home.'"

Chapter 2: Friedan states that the editorial decisions concerning women's magazines at the time were being made mostly by men, who insisted on stories and articles that showed women as either happy housewives or unhappy careerists, thus creating the "feminine mystique"—the idea that women were naturally fulfilled by devoting their lives to being housewives and mothers. Friedan also states that this is in contrast to the 1930s, at which time women's magazines often featured confident and independent heroines, many of whom were involved in careers.

Chapter 3: Friedan recalls her own decision to conform to society's expectations by giving up her promising career in psychology to raise children, and shows that other young women still struggled with the same kind of decision. Many women dropped out of school early to marry, afraid that if they waited too long or became too educated, they would not be able to attract a husband. Friedan argues at the end of the chapter that although theorists discuss how men need to find their identity, women are expected to be autonomous. She states, "Anatomy is woman's destiny, say the theorists of femininity; the identity of woman is determined by her biology." Friedan goes on to argue that the problem is women needing to mature and find their human identity: "In a sense that goes beyond any woman's life, I think this is a crisis of women growing up—a turning point from an immaturity that has been called femininity to full human identity."

Chapter 4: Friedan discusses early American feminists and how they fought against the assumption that the proper role of a woman was to be solely a wife and mother. She notes that they secured important rights for women, including education, the right to pursue a career, and the right to vote.

Chapter 5: In this chapter, Friedan, who had a degree in psychology, criticizes the founder of psychoanalysis, Sigmund Freud (whose ideas were very influential in the United States at the time of the book's publication). She notes that Freud saw women as childlike and destined to be housewives, once pointing out that Freud wrote, "I believe that all reforming action in law and education would break down in front of the fact that, long before the age at which a man can earn a position in society, Nature has determined woman's destiny through beauty, charm, and sweetness. Law and custom have much to give women that has been withheld from them, but the position of women will surely be what it is: in youth an adored darling and in mature years a loved wife." Friedan also points out that Freud's unproven concept of "penis envy" had been used to label women who wanted careers as neurotic, and that the popularity of Freud's work and ideas elevated the "feminine mystique" of female fulfillment in housewifery into a "scientific religion" that most women were not educated enough to criticize.

Chapter 6: Friedan criticizes functionalism, which attempted to make the social sciences more credible by studying the institutions of society as if they were parts of a social body, as in biology. Institutions were studied in terms of their function in society, and women were confined to their sexual biological roles as housewives and mothers as well as told that doing otherwise would upset the social balance. Friedan points out that this is unproven and that Margaret Mead, a prominent functionalist, had a flourishing career as an anthropologist.

Chapter 7: Friedan discusses the change in women's education from the 1940s to the early 1960s, in which many women's schools concentrated on non-challenging classes that focused mostly on marriage, family, and other subjects deemed suitable for women, as educators influenced by functionalism felt that too much education would spoil women's femininity and capacity for sexual fulfillment. Friedan says that this change in education arrested girls in their emotional development at a young age, because they never had to face the painful identity crisis and subsequent maturation that comes from dealing with many adult challenges.

Chapter 8: Friedan notes that the uncertainties and fears during World War II and the Cold War made Americans long for the comfort of home, so they tried to create an idealized home life with the father as breadwinner and the mother as housewife. Friedan notes that this was helped along by the fact that many of the women who worked during the war filling jobs previously held by men faced dismissal, discrimination, or hostility when the men returned, and that educators blamed over-educated, career-focused mothers for the maladjustment of soldiers in World War II. Yet as Friedan shows, later studies found that overbearing mothers, not careerists, were the ones who raised maladjusted children.

Chapter 9: Friedan shows that advertisers tried to encourage housewives to think of themselves as professionals who needed many specialized products in order to do their jobs, while discouraging housewives from having actual careers, since that would mean they would not spend as much time and effort on housework and therefore would not buy as many household products, cutting into advertisers' profits.

Chapter 10: Friedan interviews several full-time housewives, finding that although they are not fulfilled by their housework, they are all extremely busy with it. She postulates that these women unconsciously stretch their home duties to fill the time available, because the feminine mystique has taught women that this is their role, and if they ever complete their tasks they will become unneeded.

Chapter 11: Friedan notes that many housewives have sought fulfillment in sex, unable to find it in housework and children. She notes that sex cannot fulfill all of a person's needs, and that attempts to do so often drive married women to have affairs or drive their husbands away as they become obsessed with sex.

Chapter 12: Friedan discusses the fact that many children have lost interest in life or emotional growth, attributing the change to the mother's own lack of fulfillment, a side effect of the feminine mystique. When the mother lacks a self, Friedan notes, she often tries to live through her children, causing the children to lose their own sense of themselves as separate human beings with their own lives.

Chapter 13: Friedan discusses the psychologist Abraham Maslow's hierarchy of needs and notes that women have been trapped at the basic, physiological level, expected to find their identity through their sexual role alone. Friedan says that women need meaningful work just as men do to achieve self-actualization, the highest level on the hierarchy of needs.

Chapter 14: In the final chapter of The Feminine Mystique, Friedan discusses several case studies of women who have begun to go against the feminine mystique. She also advocates a new life plan for her women readers, including not viewing housework as a career, not trying to find total fulfillment through marriage and motherhood alone, and finding meaningful work that uses their full mental capacity. She discusses the conflicts that some women may face in this journey to self-actualization, including their own fears and resistance from others. For each conflict, Friedan offers examples of women who have overcome it. Friedan ends her book by promoting education and meaningful work as the ultimate method by which American women can avoid becoming trapped in the feminine mystique, calling for a drastic rethinking of what it means to be feminine, and offering several educational and occupational suggestions.

== Intended sequel ==
Friedan originally intended to write a sequel to The Feminine Mystique, which was to be called Woman: The Fourth Dimension, but instead only wrote an article by that name, which appeared in the Ladies' Home Journal in June 1964.

== Influences ==
Friedan's chapter on Freud was inspired by the philosopher Simone de Beauvoir's The Second Sex (1949).

== Legacy ==
The Feminine Mystique drew large numbers of white, middle-class women to the feminist cause.

The Feminine Mystique is widely regarded as one of the most influential nonfiction books of the 20th century, and is widely credited with sparking the beginning of second-wave feminism in the United States. Futurist Alvin Toffler declared that it "pulled the trigger on history." Friedan received hundreds of letters from unhappy housewives after its publication, and she herself went on to help found, and become the first president of the National Organization for Women (NOW), an influential feminist organization.

NOW was organized in 1966 with 30 women from different backgrounds; Friedan was one of them, and helped draft the founding statement of NOW. The statement called for "the true equality for all women". NOW demanded the removal of all barriers to "equal and economic advance". Friedan's influence can be seen in the founding statement; a main emphasis of the book is "women's need for identity and autonomy", and NOW's statement says "NOW is dedicated to the proposition that women first and foremost are human beings, who… must have the chance to develop their fullest human potential."

In addition to its contribution to feminism, The Feminine Mystique related to many other coinciding movements. "Her work indicates for us the ways that feminism was interconnected with the struggles of working-class men and women, with black and Jewish battles against racism and anti-Semitism… As a result, The Feminine Mystique had substantial impact on a wide range of political activists, thinkers, and ordinary individuals."

By the year 2000, The Feminine Mystique had sold over 3 million copies and had been translated into many foreign languages.

On February 22 and 23, 2013, a symposium titled React: The Feminine Mystique at 50, co-sponsored by The New School for Public Engagement and The Parsons School of Design, was held. An accompanying exhibit titled REACT was also on display, consisting of twenty-five pieces of artwork responding to The Feminine Mystique.

Also in February 2013, a fiftieth-anniversary edition of The Feminine Mystique was published, with a new introduction by Gail Collins.

Also in 2013, to celebrate its centennial the U.S. Department of Labor created a list of over 100 Books that Shaped Work in America, which included The Feminine Mystique. The Department of Labor later chose The Feminine Mystique as one of its top ten books from that list.

Also in 2013, The Feminine Mystique was discussed in Makers: Women Who Make America.

In 2014, the Betty Friedan Hometown Tribute committee won the Superior Achievement award in the special projects category for its 50th anniversary celebration of the publication of The Feminine Mystique. They received the award from the Illinois State Historical Society.

== Criticism ==
=== Disagreement ===
Immediately after its publishing, The Feminine Mystique was the recipient of much backlash against feminism. Significant numbers of women responded angrily to the book, which they felt implied that wives and mothers could never be fulfilled. "Women who valued their roles as mothers and housewives interpreted Friedan's message as one that threatened their stability, devalued their labor, and disrespected their intelligence." In a Letter to Editor in McCall's, one woman wrote, "All this time I thought I was happy, and a nice person. Now I discover I've been miserable and some sort of monster in disguise—now out of disguise. How awful!" Another said, "Mrs. Friedan should save her pity for those who really need it—the half starved, oppressed people in the world." When women critical of the work were not expressing personal offense at Friedan's description of the housewife's plight, they were accusing her of planning to destroy American families. Jessica Weiss quoted in her paper, "If the mothers, (or housewives as we are called) took this advice, what would become of our children? Or better yet, the future of the world."

Historian Joanne Meyerowitz argues that many of the contemporary magazines and articles of the period did not place women solely in the home, as Friedan stated, but in fact supported the notions of full- or part-time jobs for women seeking to follow a career path rather than being a housewife. These articles did, however, still emphasize the importance of maintaining the traditional image of femininity.

=== Author and publication process ===
Daniel Horowitz, a Professor of American Studies at Smith College, points out that although Friedan presented herself as a typical suburban housewife, she was involved with radical politics and labor journalism in her youth, and during the time she wrote The Feminine Mystique she worked as a freelance journalist for women's magazines and as a community organizer.

The W. W. Norton publishing house, where Betty Friedan's work was initially circulated to be published as a book also generated some criticism. In fact an employee under the alias "L M" wrote in a two-page memo that Friedan's theoretical views were "too obvious and feminine", as well as critiquing her approach by suggesting it to be unscientific.

=== Excluded groups of women ===
In addition, Friedan has been criticized for focusing solely on the plight of middle-class white women, and not giving enough attention to the differing situations encountered by women in less stable economic situations, or women of other races. According to Kirsten Fermaglich and Lisa Fine, "women of color—African American, Latina, Asian American and Native American women—were completely absent from Friedan's vision, as were white working-class and poor women." Despite being written during the Civil Rights Movement, Friedan's text "barely mentions African-American women." In her Feminist Theory: From Margin to Center, Black feminist bell hooks writes "She did not speak of the needs of women without men, without children, without homes. She ignored the existence of all non-white women and poor white women. She did not tell readers whether it was more fulfilling to be a maid, a babysitter, a factory worker, a clerk, or a prostitute than to be a leisure-class housewife. She made her plight and the plight of white women like herself synonymous with a condition affecting all American women. In so doing, she deflected attention away from her classism, her racism, her sexist attitudes towards the masses of American women. In the context of her book, Friedan makes clear that the women she saw as victimized by sexism were college-educated white women".

Friedan has also been criticized for prejudice against homosexuality. In part, this criticism stems from her adherence to the paradigmatic belief at the time that "bad mothers" caused deviance from heteronormative and cisnormative society.

Despite these criticisms, her "language aimed at white American middle-class women won large numbers of supporters to the feminist cause," implying perhaps that Friedan's decision to exclude other groups was deliberate in mobilizing a group of women that had in some cases not thought of the improvement of their rights.

== See also ==
- Biblical patriarchy
- Cult of Domesticity
- History of feminism
- Sex and the Single Girl
- The Female Eunuch
