= Thierno Bah =

Thierno Bah may refer to:

- Thierno Bah (footballer, born 1982), Guinean footballer
- Thierno Bah (soccer, born 2004), or Elage Bah, Canadian soccer player
- Thierno Abdourahmane Bah (1916–2013), Guinean writer, poet and theologian
- Thierno Bah, French politician, candidate in 2024 election in Tarn's 2nd constituency
