= Bone Black: Memories of Girlhood =

1996 book by bell hooks

- Book Cover for Bone Black
- Author: bell hooks
- Original title: Bone Black: Memories of Girlhood
- Language: English
- Genre: Memoir
- Publisher: Henry Holt and Company
- Publication place: United States
- English publication date: 1996
- Media type: Print (paperback)
- Pages: 183 pp
- ISBN: 0-8050-4145-1
- OCLC: 34356274
- Dewey Decimal: 305.48896/073 B 20
- LC Class: E185.97.H77 A3 1996

Bone Black: Memories of Girlhood (Holt, 1996) is a memoir by bell hooks. It details her childhood experiences as a poor, African-American girl growing up against a background of racial segregation. As described by Kirkus Reviews, "Telling her story in brief vignettes, hooks illuminates each of the elements that composed that world, describing her parents, torn, sometimes to the point of violence, by the pressures that married life brings; an extended family that provided her with room to dream at the same time that it fed her a range of conflicting cues about how to live; a black subculture that instilled a series of painful lessons in color-driven self-evaluation; and finally, a white majority culture that could offer both the benefits of literature and the punishments of racial discrimination."
