= Labé =

Labé 𞤂𞤢𞤦𞤫 (Pular)
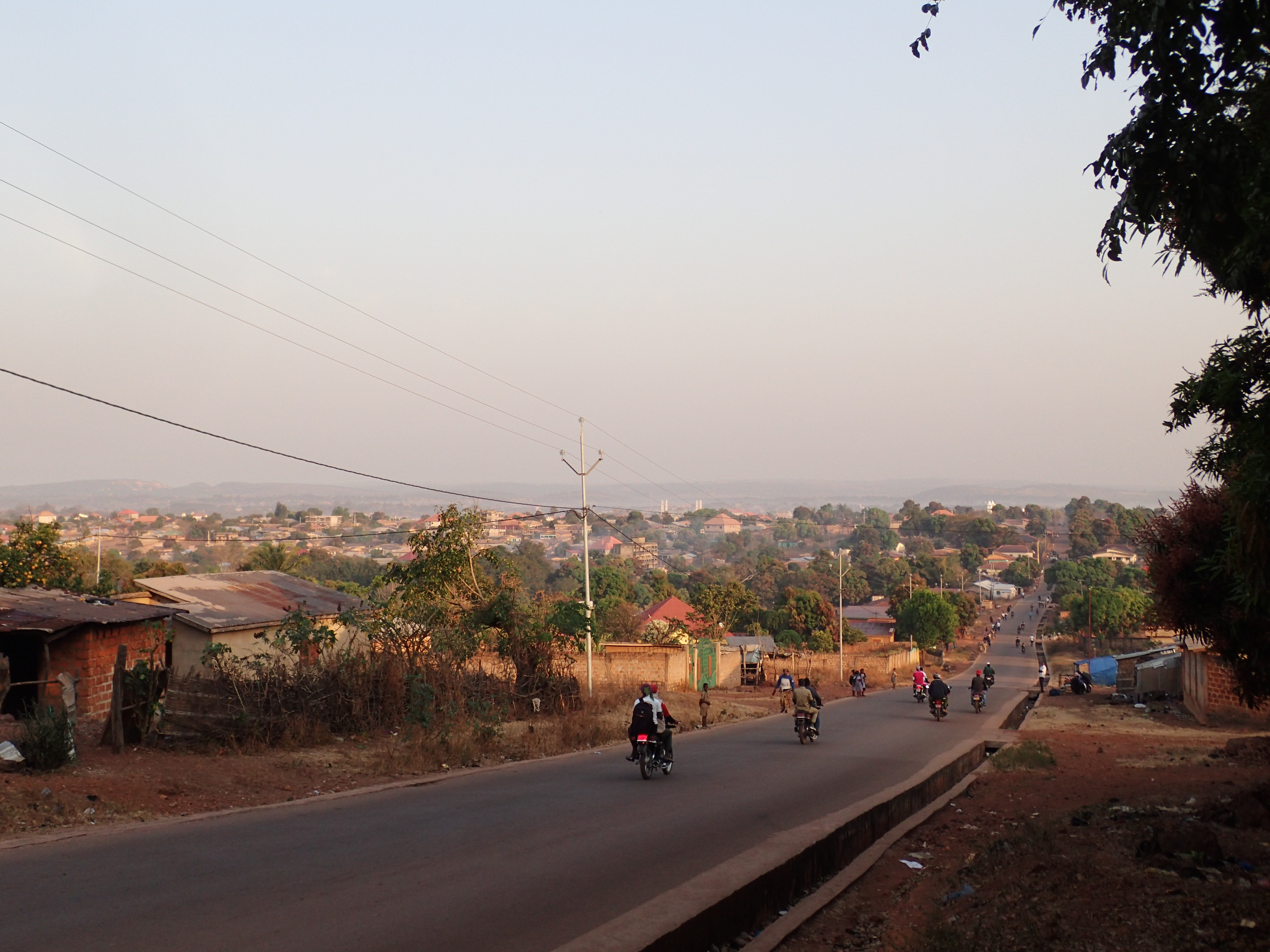
- Labé

- Location within Guinea
- Coordinates: 11°19′N 12°17′W
- Country: Guinea
- Region: Labé Region
- Prefecture: Labé Prefecture

Population (2014 census)
  - Total: 200,000
- Time zone: UTC±0 (UTC)
- Altitude: 1,050 metres (3,440 ft)

Labé (Pular: 𞤂𞤢𞤦𞤫) is the main city and administrative capital of the Fouta Djallon region of Guinea. It has a population of about 200,000. It is the second largest city in the country after the capital Conakry in terms of economic importance. Labé is situated some 450 kilometres or 280 miles northeast of Conakry close to the geographic centre of Guinea.

== History ==
The city was founded in the 1720s by the Fulani people and named for their chief, Manga Labé. It developed as a major trade center linking the Niger river to the Atlantic coast.

The city was the capital of the Diwal/province of Labe within the Imamate of Futa Jallon prior to French colonisation. It was home to Muslim leaders and scholars who resisted colonisation, such as Alpha Yaya Diallo. Labe is the most important city in the Moyenne (Middle) Guinea region also known as Fouta Djallon. Labe is considered as a major cultural and religious center in West Africa, especially among the Fulani people. Many Muslim scholars made Labe a famous learning place in Islamic studies. The most prominent of the erudites being Alfa Oumarou Rafiou (Dara Labe), Thierno Doura Sombili, Thierno Diawo Pellel, Thierno Aliou Bhouba Dian.

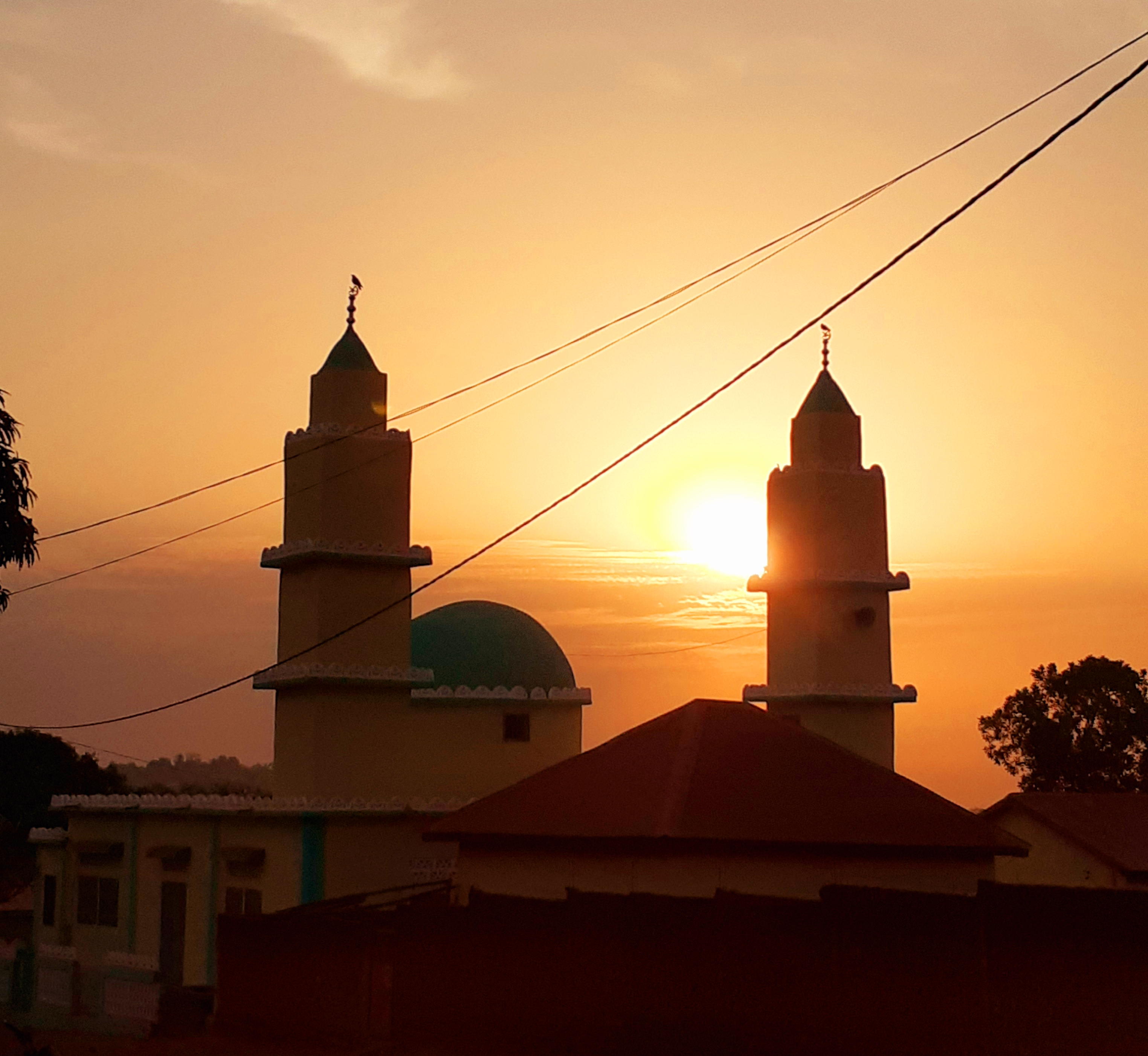
The Hoggo Mosque in Labé

== Economy ==
Labé is an important commercial centre in the region, arising out of its strategic geographical position between several other countries. Traders from nearby regions such as Pita, Tougué, Koubia, Lélouma, Mali Yemberin and other countries including Mali, Senegal, the Gambia and Sierra Leone gather in Labé. Its central market is the second largest in the country after the Madina market in Conakry. Trade or commerce has become the main activity in the city, but Labe also has a small manufacturing industry consisting mainly of shoe making, textile, carpentry, blacksmithing... It is known for weaving and honey. The city also benefits from a considerable diaspora whose repatriated income contributes significantly to infrastructural development in Labé and helps to overcome the region's relatively poorer revenue stream. Merchants from the city dominate the informal economy in most Guinean cities and are also economically active in cities further afield, such as Dakar, Bamako, Abidjan, Bissau and Freetown.

The city also has a museum, while the Saala Falls and Mount Kolima lie nearby.

The town is served by Tata Airport. A jet-capable airport near Labé was built by Cuban engineers in 1973. Currently the airport remains unused due to the lack of airline traffic connecting the different regions and major cities in Guinea.

The city has a sizable stadium (stade Saifoulaye Diallo) which hosts soccer/football games played by the local club Fello Star. However the sport facility is poorly maintained and kept.

== Climate ==
Labé has a tropical savanna climate (Köppen climate classification Aw) with extreme temperature differences between day and night due to the city’s altitude of over 1,000 metres or 3,280 feet. It is as hot by day as the coast of Guinea all year round, but cold to comfortable at night due to lower heat storage in thinner air. About 1,550 millimetres or 61 inches of rain fall annually, almost all between late April and early November.

Climate data for Labé, Guinea (1945-2022)
Month	Jan	Feb	Mar	Apr	May	Jun	Jul	Aug	Sep	Oct	Nov	Dec	Year
Record high °C (°F)	35.5 (95.9)	34.7 (94.5)	40.5 (104.9)	39.0 (102.2)	40.0 (104.0)	35.0 (95.0)	30.0 (86.0)	35.5 (95.9)	33.0 (91.4)	30.0 (86.0)	35.0 (95.0)	34.4 (93.9)	40.5 (104.9)
Mean daily maximum °C (°F)	29.5 (85.1)	31.1 (88.0)	32.6 (90.7)	32.6 (90.7)	30.8 (87.4)	27.8 (82.0)	25.8 (78.4)	25.3 (77.5)	26.0 (78.8)	27.0 (80.6)	28.1 (82.6)	28.4 (83.1)	28.8 (83.7)
Daily mean °C (°F)	20.9 (69.6)	22.5 (72.5)	24.1 (75.4)	25.1 (77.2)	24.6 (76.3)	22.8 (73.0)	21.7 (71.1)	21.4 (70.5)	21.6 (70.9)	21.9 (71.4)	21.3 (70.3)	20.5 (68.9)	22.4 (72.3)
Mean daily minimum °C (°F)	12.3 (54.1)	13.9 (57.0)	15.6 (60.1)	17.6 (63.7)	18.4 (65.1)	17.7 (63.9)	17.5 (63.5)	17.6 (63.7)	17.2 (63.0)	16.8 (62.2)	14.6 (58.3)	12.6 (54.7)	16.0 (60.8)
Record low °C (°F)	3.8 (38.8)	6.0 (42.8)	7.0 (44.6)	8.8 (47.8)	10.9 (51.6)	10.5 (50.9)	11.0 (51.8)	12.5 (54.5)	13.2 (55.8)	11.1 (52.0)	8.1 (46.6)	4.4 (39.9)	3.8 (38.8)
Average precipitation mm (inches)	2 (0.1)	4 (0.2)	9 (0.4)	35 (1.4)	141 (5.6)	233 (9.2)	315 (12.4)	340 (13.4)	288 (11.3)	141 (5.6)	34 (1.3)	2 (0.1)	1,543 (60.7)
Average precipitation days (≥ 1.0 mm)	0	0	1	3	11	15	20	22	21	12	2	1	108
Average relative humidity (%)	38	37	40	43	64	74	86	82	81	77	71	47	62
Mean monthly sunshine hours	270	256	261	232	211	180	148	131	159	195	236	257	2,536
Percentage possible sunshine	76	79	71	63	54	47	38	34	44	54	69	73	58
Source: NOAA (precipitation, humidity, and sunshine 1961-1990)

== Education ==
- ENI of Labé, a public general education institution

== Notable people ==
- Thierno Abdourahmane Bah (1916 - 2013) - Poet and imam of Labe mosque
- Sirah Baldé (1927/8–2018) – novelist and teacher
- Cellou Dalein Diallo – politician and economist
- Koumanthio Zeinab Diallo – poet, novelist and playwright
- Siradiou Diallo (1936–2004) – politician and journalist
