= Cultural Criticism and Transformation =

1997 videos by bell hooks

bell hooks: Cultural Criticism and Transformation
- Directed by: Sut Jhally
- Produced by: Sut Jhally
- Starring: bell hooks
- Edited by: Mary Patierno, Sut Jhally & Harriet Hirshorn
- Release date: 1997

Cultural Criticism and Transformation (1997), by bell hooks, is a two-part video that critiques stereotypical portrayals of race, gender and class in the media with extensive examples. In conclusion, hooks makes an argument for the power of cultural criticism.

The interview style film is divided into two parts:

- Part One is titled On Cultural Criticism and is divided into seven sub-categories including Why Study Popular Culture?, Critical Thinking as Transformation, the Power of Representation, Motivated Representations, an Example of Motivated Representation: Leaving Las Vegas & the Backlash Against Feminism, Why "White Supremacist Capitalist Patriarchy?", and Enlightened Witness.
- Part Two is titled Doing Cultural Criticism and consists of eight subcategories: Constructed Narrative, Dealing with O.J., Madonna: from Feminism to Patriarchy, Spike Lee: Hollywood's Fall Guy, the Voyeur's Gaze, Rap: Authentic Expression or Market Construct?, Color Coding Black Female Bodies, Consuming Commodified Blackness.

== Part One: On Cultural Criticism ==
Why Study Popular Culture?: bell hooks briefly discusses her book Outlaw Culture in relation to her concerns with problematic patterns appearing in popular culture. She tells how sometimes she found the best way to teach students or individuals about "otherness" was by relating it to a medium they were familiar with, the media and popular culture.

hooks then continues on to explain that unlike critical theory that may be hard for a lot of people to access or understand, popular culture is able to reach the masses and be more likely to be easily understood by them. Thus, it has become increasingly more popular for the masses to be educated by popular culture rather than theory based essays.

Critical Thinking as Transformation: She then continues on to share her experience about "teaching at very fancy private predominantly white schools to teaching at an urban, predominantly non-white campus in Harlem". Despite the variance of national academic rank, she states that students at both schools were brilliant, but the schools differentiated in how students saw themselves. Students at the prestigious schools knew their worth and had a sense of entitlement about their futures because so much has been promised to them in attending these schools. While students at the Harlem school did not share their same sense of entitlement because nothing has been promised to them.

The Power of Representation: hooks debates the direct link between representations (in pop culture) and how we live our lives, that are often denied, such as; the over-sexualized woman that obeys the male fantasy and black men always being cast as the villain. "I feel that it's frightening that as mass media uses more certain kinds of representations for specific impact and effect, we're also being told that these images are not really that important".

Why "White Supremacist Capitalist Patriarchy?": hooks breaks down why they coined the term White Supremacist Capitalist Patriarchy, which can be summarized by the following quotes: "I began to use the phrase in my work 'white supremacist capitalist patriarchy' because I wanted to have some language that would actually remind us continually of the interlocking systems of domination that define our reality...To me an important break through, I felt, in my work and that of others was the call to use the term white supremacy, over racism because racism in and of itself did not really allow for a discourse of colonization and decolonization, the recognition of the internalized racism within people of color and it was always in a sense keeping things at the level at which whiteness and white people remained at the center of the discussion".

Enlightened Witness: This chapter focuses on being critical of what we see on screen and it can be summarized by the following quotes from the section: "And the issue is not freeing ourselves from representation. It's really about being enlightened witnesses when we watch representations, which means we are able to be critically vigilant about both what is being told to us and how we respond to what is being told...I don't think we will get much further in terms of decolonizing our minds. So that we can both resist certain kinds of conservatizing representation and at the same time create new and exciting representations.

== Part Two: Doing Cultural Criticism ==
In Part Two, she demonstrates the value of cultural studies in concrete analysis through such subjects as the OJ Simpson case, Madonna, Spike Lee, and Gangsta rap. The aim of cultural analysis, she argues, should be the production of enlightened witnesses – audiences who engaged with the representations of cultural life knowledgeably and vigilantly.

Constructed Narrative: In this passage, hooks deconstructs the choices made in the production of a film that narrates how the work will be read. hooks makes a point that casting directors and other prominent people working on a film make conscious choices of casting and when certain types of people are routinely cast in the same position. She makes a point that these routine types of molds people are cast in help to reinscribe stereotypes that are both harmful on and offscreen.
