= Feminist Theory: From Margin to Center =

1984 book by bell hooks

- Cover of the first edition
- Author: bell hooks
- Language: English
- Subject: Feminist theory
- Publication date: 1984
- Publication place: United States
- Media type: Print (Hardcover and Paperback)
- ISBN: 978-1138821668

Feminist Theory: From Margin to Center is a 1984 book about feminist theory by bell hooks. It was first published by South End Press in 1984. The book confirmed her importance in radical feminist thought. The "margin" in the title refers to hooks' description of black women as existing on the margins and their lives hidden from mainstream American society as well as not being part of mainstream feminist theory. The book was published in French in 2017.

In the preface to the 2015 third edition, hooks states that the women's liberation movement was primarily structured around issues relevant to white women with class privilege, and therefore the book addresses a need for feminist theory that takes into account gender, race and class.

In the first chapter hooks critiques Betty Friedan's The Feminine Mystique (1963) as being a limited one dimensional perspective on women's reality even if it is a useful discussion about the impact of sexist discrimination on a select group of women, college-educated, middle- and upper-class married white women, namely housewives. hooks argues that Friedan does not include the lives, experiences or needs of women without men, women without children, women without homes, non-white women or poor women.

In the book, hooks uses the term white-supremacist capitalist patriarchy as a lens through which to both critique various aspects of American culture and to offer potential solutions to the problems she explores. hooks addresses topics including the goals of feminist movement, the role of men in feminist struggle, the relevance of pacifism, solidarity among women, and the nature of revolution. hooks can be identified in her discussions of these topics as a radical feminist because of her arguments that the system itself is corrupt and that achieving equality in such a system is neither possible nor desirable. She promotes instead a complete transformation of society and all of its institutions as a result of protracted struggle, envisioning a life-affirming, peaceful tomorrow.
