= Thierno Abdourahmane Bah =

Guinean writer and Muslim theologian (1916–2013)

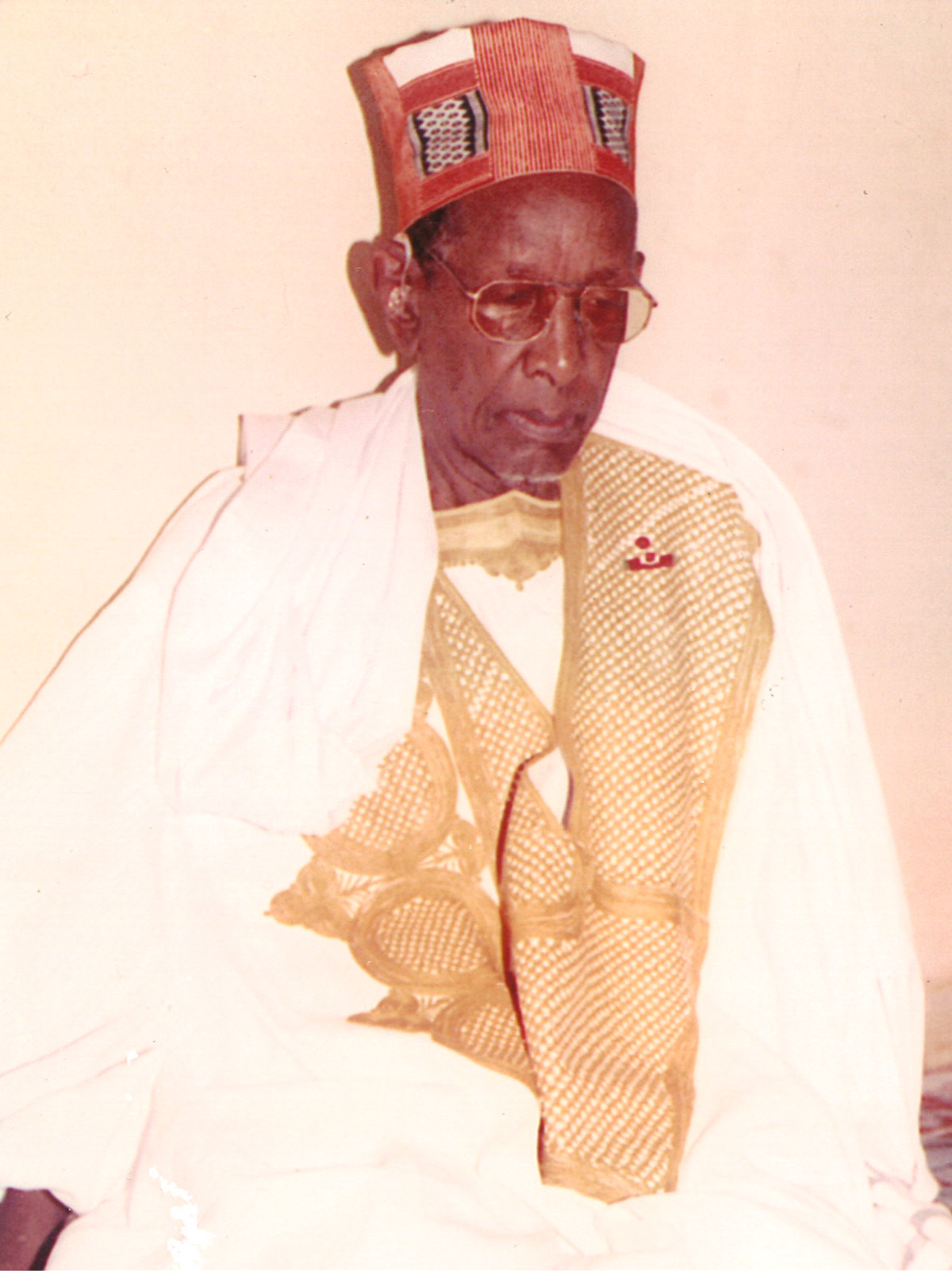
- Born: 1916; Donghol Thiernoya, Labé, French Guinea
- Died: 22 September 2013 (aged 97); Labé, Guinea
- Resting place: Labé, Guinea
- Occupations: Writer, poet, Islamic scholar
- Notable work: Banaatu Afkaarii; Gimi Pular (1987); Ƴeewirde Fuuta
- Parents: Thierno Aliou Bhoubha Ndiyan (father); Maryama Fadi Diallo (mother)

Thierno Abdourahmane Bah (1916 – 22 September 2013) was a Guinean writer, poet and Muslim theologian of the Fouta Djallon. A son of the Fula scholar Thierno Aliou Bhoubha Ndiyan, he wrote poetry in Arabic and Pular, was imam of the grand mosque of Labé for most of the period between 1973 and 2005, and served as Guinea's minister of religious affairs from 1984 to 1987.

== Early life and education ==
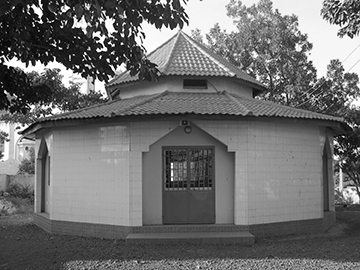
Thierno Aliou Bhoubha Ndiyan's house in Labé

Bah was born in 1916 at Donghol Thiernoya, a quarter of Labé in the Fouta Djallon highlands of French Guinea. He was the penultimate son of the Islamic scholar and poet Thierno Aliou Bhoubha Ndiyan, and the third of the four sons of his mother, Maryama Fadi Diallo, who died a centenarian in 1978. In the clan, boys who received his given name were called Thierno from baptism, after the ancestor Thierno Abdourahmane Nduyeejo, son of Thierno Malal Diafunanke, whom Karamokho Alfa had made the first imam of Labé around 1750; the office stayed with his descendants almost without interruption.

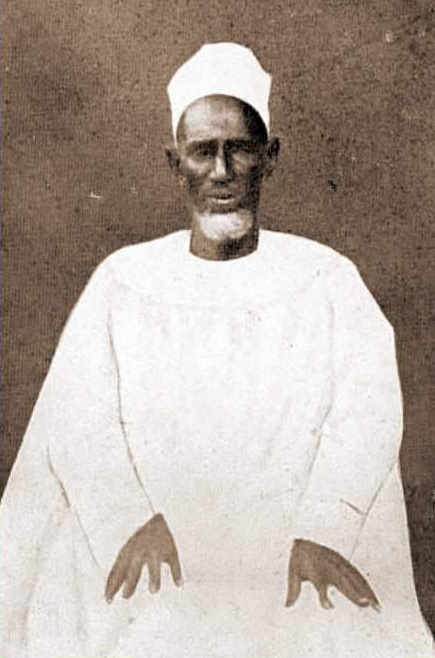
Bah's father, Thierno Aliou Bhoubha Ndiyan

His father ran one of the largest Quranic schools of the Fouta Djallon. The French colonial scholar Paul Marty, who studied him in 1915, called him "an Arabic scholar of the very first rank, remarkably learned in Arabic and Islamic sciences" and reported that several hundred Quranic teachers had trained under him. Thierno Aliou also wrote classical verse in Arabic and Pular, and in the evenings had his older students recite his poems; several of them later wrote poetry of their own, the most productive being Thierno Jawo Pellel.

By the time his father died on 23 March 1927 (22 Ramadan 1342 AH), the eleven-year-old Bah had finished reading the Quran, the first cycle of traditional schooling in the Fouta Djallon. With his brother Thierno Habibou, who had memorized the Quran under their father, he had completed two short Islamic treatises, Bur-hanu and Sulaymi, as well as the Risala of Ibn Abi Zayd al-Qayrawani, the manual of law and ritual taught in the Quranic schools of the region; the brothers were revising the Muhayyibi, a poem in praise of the Islamic prophet Muhammad, with their nephew Dai.

A few weeks after the funeral, Bah joined the school of his cousin Thierno Oumar Pereedjo at Dara-Labé, some twelve kilometers south of Labé, where he studied from 1927 to 1935. There he studied Arabic grammar, law (fiqh), theology (tawhid) and related disciplines; completion of the tafsir, the annotated translation of the Quran, marked the end of the course and carried, by tradition, the title Thierno. He began writing occasional verse in Arabic and Pular in his student years and continued in both languages throughout his life.

== Writings ==
=== Arabic ===
Bah's Arabic prose consists mainly of the sermons he gave before Friday prayers at the Karamoko Alfa mosque in Labé and of papers written for the International Academy of Islamic Law on questions of contemporary life, among them the observance of contracts, human rights, the blood price, sects in Islam, surrogate motherhood, family planning and AIDS.

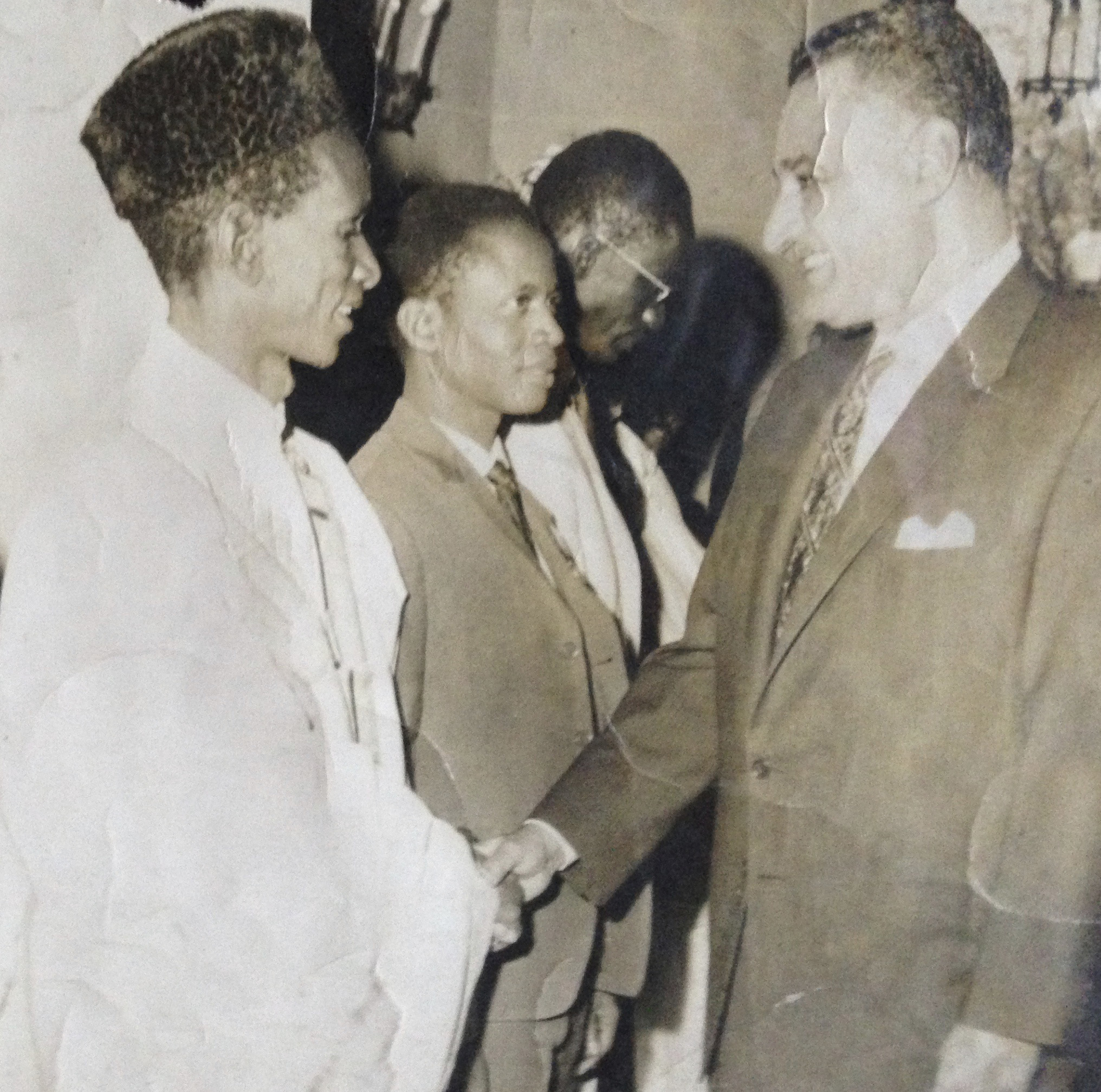
Bah (left) meeting the Egyptian president Gamal Abdel Nasser

His occasional poems in Arabic were collected as Banaatu Afkaarii ("The Fruits of My Thoughts"), copied out by the calligrapher al-Hajj Hanafiyyou Kompayya and printed in Kuwait on the recommendation of the Kuwaiti foreign minister. The collection includes the verse thanks that Bah addressed to his teacher at the end of his studies, Thierno Oumar's reply, and praise poems for Arab leaders he met, including Gamal Abdel Nasser, Fahd of Saudi Arabia and the emir of Kuwait. Two longer volumes, Maqaalida as-Saadati ("The Keys of Happiness", printed in Algeria with the subtitle Miftahu al-Masarrati) and Jilada Mada fii Hizbi al-Qahhar, rework poems by his father in the takhmis manner, expanding each two-line stanza into five lines while keeping the rhyme and sense of the original. A further volume, Waciyyatu al-Walidi, was printed in Conakry.

=== Pular ===
Most of his Pular poems first circulated as loose manuscript sheets, and some were lost; a student in Pita once sent him back the only copy he still lacked of his poem on the Amicale Gilbert Vieillard. Alpha Ibrahima Sow published three of the poems (Fuuta hettii bhuttu, Kaaweedji Djamaanu meen and Faatunde Siriifu Sagale) in La Femme, la Vache, la Foi (1966), and Boubacar Biro Diallo's anthology Gimdhi Pular printed two of the same texts together with Lagine Rindhii (1974), a poem on the independence of Guinea. A collection prepared by Bah himself, Gimi Pular (Conakry, 1987), opens with a study of the Islamization of the Fouta and a list of its almamis and leading scholars, and includes the hymn to the Fouta and a series of didactic poems. His collected Pular works were later published under the title Ƴeewirde Fuuta.

The best known of these poems is the hymn to the Fouta Djallon, Fuuta hettii bhuttu, composed in 1946 when Fula intellectuals founded the cultural association Amicale Gilbert Vieillard. The poem recalls the requisitions imposed on the population during the Second World War, describes the landscapes of his native region and ends with a call to patriotism and to the education of the young. In 1977 Guinea's cultural commission published a collection of his didactic Pular poems for the Second World Black and African Festival of Arts and Culture (FESTAC 77) in Nigeria.

== Public offices ==
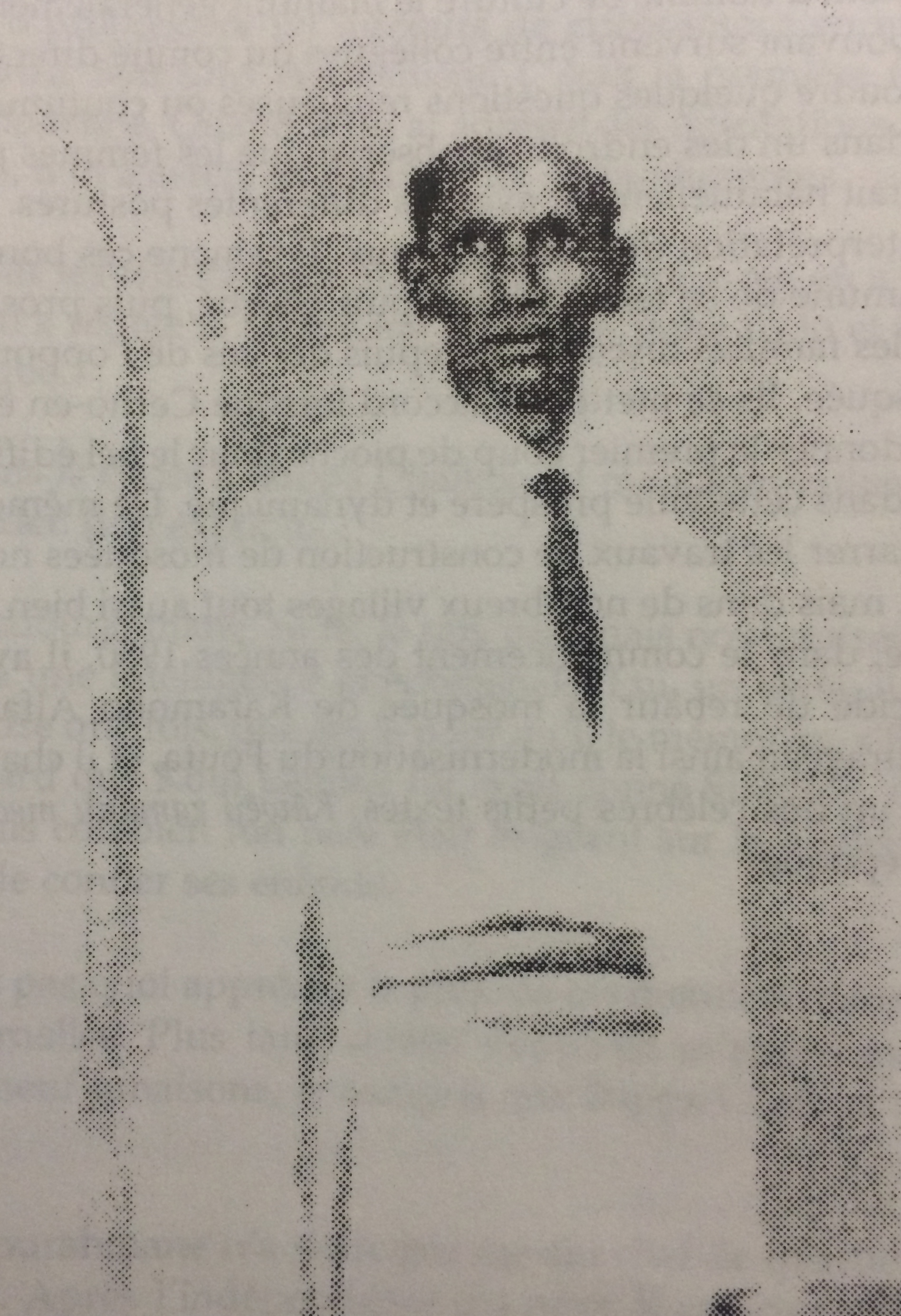
Bah as deputy mayor of Labé

When Labé became a commune, Bah was elected deputy mayor, serving from 1956 to 1959. From 1959 to 1974 he was an arrondissement commander, the sub-prefect of the period, in several localities of the Fouta Djallon, among them Thianguel Bori, Timbi Madina, Konah and Dara-Labé. He then served as inspector of Franco-Arabic schools (1974–1976) and sat on the National Islamic Council, where he was responsible for organizing the Guinean pilgrimage to Mecca (1976–1984). From 1957 he took part in international Islamic meetings, including the founding of a Muslim cultural union in Dakar (1957), a colloquium in Cairo (1964) and an imam-training seminar of the Muslim World League in Nouakchott (1977).

After the military coup of 3 April 1984, the new government appointed him minister of religious affairs, a post he held until 1987. He then asked to be relieved of it because he had reached retirement age.

== Religious leadership ==
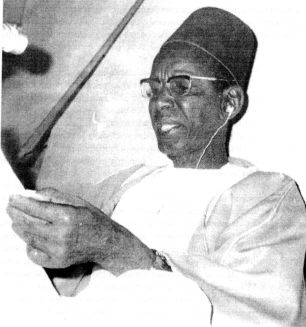
Bah preaching before Friday prayers at the Karamoko Alfa mosque in Labé, 1989

Bah was imam of the grand mosque of Labé, the mosque of Karamoko Alfa, from 1973 to 1983. He introduced a weekly public session there before the Friday sermon, answering questions the faithful sent in by letter; letters came from across the Fouta Djallon, and the talks were later carried by Labé's rural radio. From 1981 he was vice-president of the International Academy of Islamic Law (Majma al-Fiqh). While minister he was also imam of the Faisal Mosque in Conakry, inaugurated shortly before the 1984 coup. In 1987 he returned to Labé and led the grand mosque again until he retired in 2005.

== Death ==
Bah died in Labé on 22 September 2013, aged 97, after an illness. He was buried in the city the following day; President Alpha Condé attended the funeral. Guinean media remembered him as the khalife of the Fouta Djallon.

== See also ==
- Islam in Guinea
