= Koumanthio Zeinab Diallo =

Guinean poet, novelist and playwright

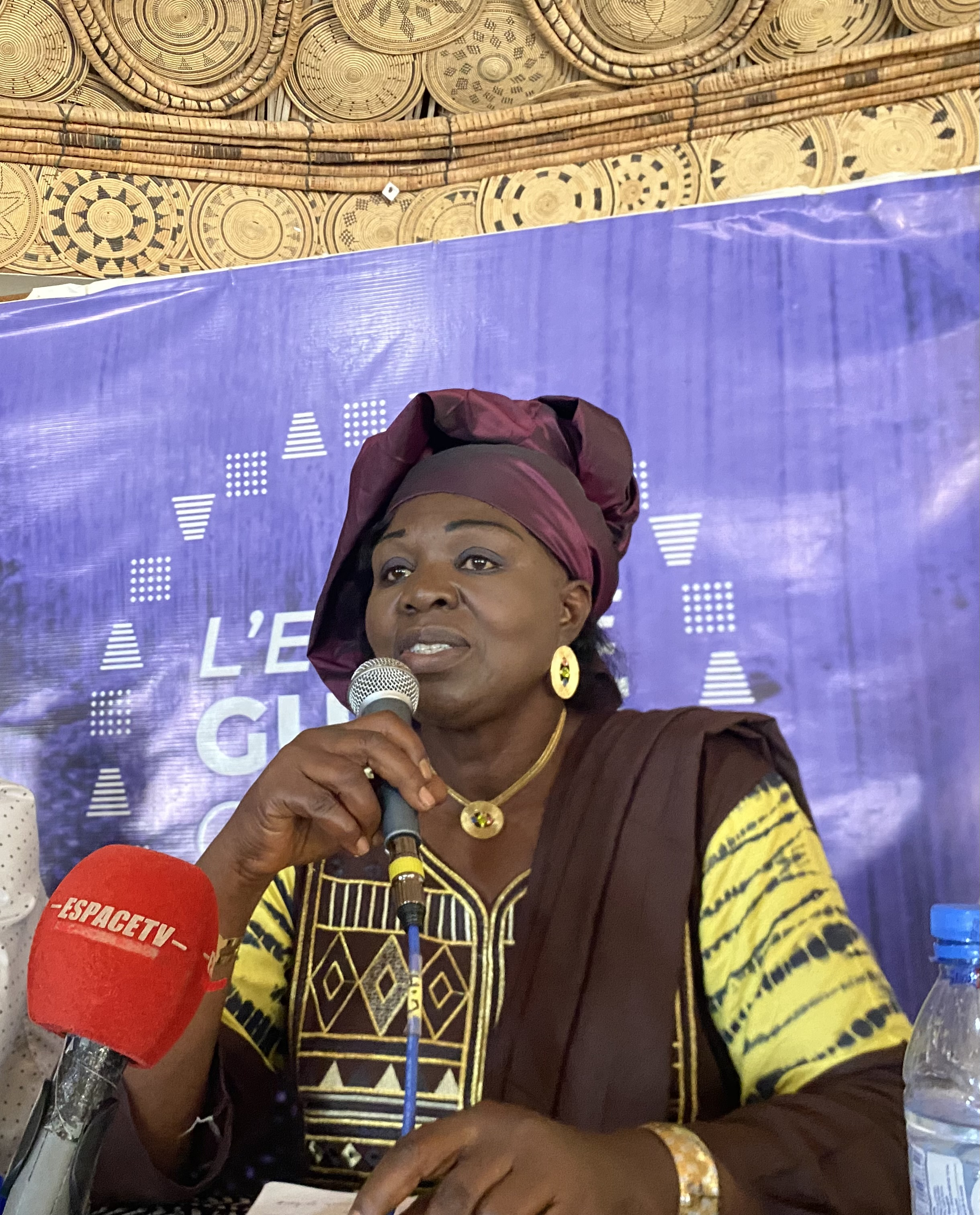

Koumanthio Zeinab Diallo (born 1956) is a Guinean poet, novelist and playwright who writes in both French and Fulani.

== Life ==
Koumanthio Zeinab Diallo was born in 1956 in Labé, Guinea.

She has also worked as an agricultural engineer.

In 2002 she and Bonata Dieng founded the Fouta Djallon Museum in Labé.

== Works ==
- Moi, femme (Me, a woman), 1994.
- Pellun Gondhi, Guinée: Éditions Ganndal, 1996
- Les épines de l'amour (The Thorns of Love), Paris: L'Harmattan, 1997
- Pour les oiseaux du ciel et de la terre (For the birds of heaven and earth), UNICEF, 1997
- Comme les pétales du crépuscule (Like Petals at Dawn), Lomé: La Semeuse, 1998.
- Comme une colombe en furie, poésie pour enfants (Like a dove in fury, poetry for children), éditions Linda, 1999
- La morte de la guerre (The dead of war), 2000.
- Daado l'orpheline et autres contes du Fouta Djallon de Guinée (Daado the orphan girl, and other stories of the Guinea's Fouta Djallon), Paris: L'Harmattan, 2004
- Le Fils du roi Guémé et autres contes du Fouta Djallon de Guinée (The son of the King of Guémé and other stories of Guinea's Fouta Djallon), Paris: L'Harmattan, 2004. With a preface by Bernard Salvaing.
- Les rires du silence (The Joys of Silence), Paris: L'Harmattan, 2005
- Les humiliées (Humiliated Women), Paris: L'Harmattan, 2005.
- Ngôtté-le-génie de la chasse - conte du Fouta Djallon en Guinée (Ngôtté the hunting genius - a story of the Guinea's Fouta Djallon), Paris: L'Harmattan, 2007
- Les fous du septième ciel: Au-dela de l’excision (The madmen of the seventh heaven: Beyond circumcision), Silex/Nouvelles du Sud, 2014
