= Bell hooks =

American author and activist (1952–2021)

bell hooks
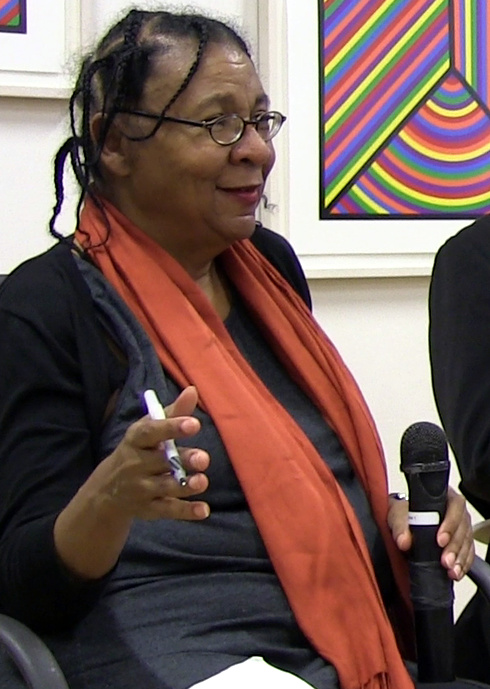
- hooks in October 2014
- Born: Gloria Jean Watkins; September 25, 1952; Hopkinsville, Kentucky, U.S.
- Died: December 15, 2021 (aged 69); Berea, Kentucky, U.S.
- Education: Stanford University (BA); University of Wisconsin–Madison (MA); University of California, Santa Cruz (PhD)
- Occupations: Author; academic; activist
- Years active: 1978–2018
- Known for: Oppositional gaze
- Notable work: Ain't I a Woman?: Black Women and Feminism (1981); Feminist Theory: From Margin to Center (1984); Teaching to Transgress (1994); All About Love: New Visions (2000); Teaching Community: A pedagogy of hope (2003); We Real Cool: Black Men and Masculinity (2004)
- Website: bellhooksinstitute.com at the Wayback Machine (archived January 8, 2021)

Gloria Jean Watkins (September 25, 1952 – December 15, 2021), better known by her pen name bell hooks (stylized in lowercase), was an American philosopher, educator, author, and social critic; she was a Distinguished Professor in Residence at Berea College in Kentucky. Professor hooks wrote about race, feminism, and social class. Her work explored the intersections of race, capitalism, and gender, and what she described as their ability to produce and perpetuate systems of oppression and class domination. Her work served as foundational to the modern idea of intersectionality. She published numerous scholarly articles and nearly 40 books, in styles ranging from essays and poetry to children's literature, with a body of work that addressed love, gender, art, history, sexuality, and mass media.

hooks began her academic career in 1976 teaching English and ethnic studies at the University of Southern California. She later taught at several institutions including Stanford University (as a guest-lecturer), Yale University, New College of Florida, and The City College of New York, before joining Berea College in Berea, Kentucky, in 2004. In 2014, hooks also founded the bell hooks Institute at Berea College. Her pen name was borrowed from her maternal great-grandmother, Bell Blair Hooks, using lowercase to decenter herself and instead maintain focus on the substance of her writings.

== Early life ==
Gloria Jean Watkins was born on September 25, 1952, to a working-class African-American family, in Hopkinsville, a small, segregated town in Kentucky. hooks was one of six children born to Rosa Bell Watkins (née Oldham) and Veodis Watkins. Her father worked as a janitor and her mother worked as a maid in the homes of white families. In her memoir Bone Black: Memories of Girlhood (1996), hooks would write of her "struggle to create self and identity" while growing up in "a rich magical world of southern black culture that was sometimes paradisiacal and at other times terrifying."

An avid reader (with poets William Wordsworth, Langston Hughes, Elizabeth Barrett Browning and Gwendolyn Brooks among her favorites), hooks was educated in racially segregated public schools, later moving to an integrated school in the late 1960s. This experience greatly influenced her perspective as an educator, and it inspired scholarship on education practices as seen in her book, Teaching to Transgress: Education as the Practice of Freedom. She graduated from Hopkinsville High School before obtaining her B.A. in English from Stanford University in 1973, and her M.A. in English from the University of Wisconsin–Madison in 1976. During this time, hooks was writing her book Ain't I a Woman: Black Women and Feminism, which she began writing at the age of 19 (c.1971) and then published (as bell hooks) in 1981.

In 1983, after several years of teaching and writing, hooks completed her doctorate in literature at the University of California, Santa Cruz, with a dissertation on author Toni Morrison entitled "Keeping a Hold on Life: Reading Toni Morrison's Fiction".

== Influences ==
Among hooks' influences is the American abolitionist and feminist Sojourner Truth. Truth's "Ain't I a Woman?" inspired hooks's first major book. The Brazilian educator Paulo Freire is mentioned in hooks's book Teaching to Transgress. His perspectives on education are present in the first chapter, "engaged pedagogy". Other influences include Peruvian theologian Gustavo Gutiérrez, psychologist Erich Fromm, playwright Lorraine Hansberry, Buddhist monk Thích Nhất Hạnh, and African American writer James Baldwin. Frantz Fanon's The Wretched of the Earth was a powerful inspiration for hooks and her approach to the decolonial struggle.

== Teaching and writing ==
She began her academic career in 1976 as an English professor and senior lecturer in ethnic studies at the University of Southern California. During her three years there, Golemics, a Los Angeles publisher, released her first published work, a chapbook of poems titled And There We Wept (1978), written under the name "bell hooks". She had adopted her maternal great-grandmother's name as her pen name because, as she later put it, her great-grandmother "was known for her snappy and bold tongue, which [she] greatly admired". She also said she put the name in lowercase letters to convey that what is most important to focus upon is her works, not her personal qualities: the "substance of books, not who [she is]". On the unconventional lowercasing of her pen name, hooks added that, "When the feminist movement was at its zenith in the late '60s and early '70s, there was a lot of moving away from the idea of the person. It was: Let's talk about the ideas behind the work, and the people matter less.... It was kind of a gimmicky thing, but lots of feminist women were doing it."

In the early 1980s and 1990s, hooks taught at several post-secondary institutions, including the University of California, Santa Cruz, San Francisco State University, Yale (1985 to 1988, as assistant professor of African and Afro-American Studies and English), Oberlin College (1988 to 1994, as associate professor of American literature and Women's Studies), and, beginning in 1994, as Distinguished Professor of English at City College of New York.

South End Press published her first major work, Ain't I a Woman? Black Women and Feminism, in 1981, though she had started writing it years earlier at the age of 19, while still an undergraduate. In the decades since its publication, Ain't I a Woman? has been recognized for its contribution to feminist thought, with Publishers Weekly in 1992 naming it "one of the twenty most influential women's books in the last 20 years". Writing in The New York Times in 2019, Min Jin Lee said that Ain't I a Woman "remains a radical and relevant work of political theory. She lays the groundwork of her feminist theory by giving historical evidence of the specific sexism that black female slaves endured and how that legacy affects black womanhood today." Ain't I a Woman? examines themes including the historical impact of sexism and racism on black women, devaluation of black womanhood, media roles and portrayal, the education system, the idea of a White-supremacist-capitalist-patriarchy and the marginalization of black women.

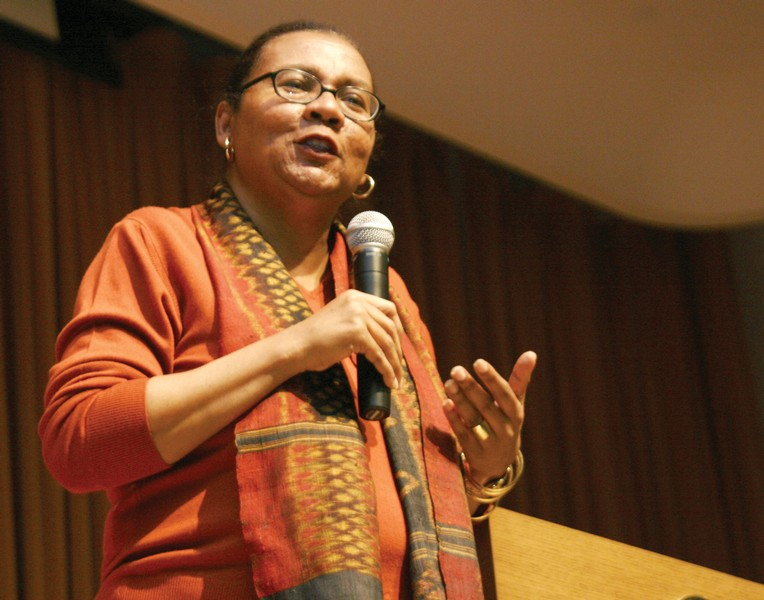
bell hooks in 2009

At the same time, hooks became significant as a leftist and postmodern political thinker and cultural critic. She published more than 30 books, ranging in topics from Black men, patriarchy, and masculinity to self-help; engaged pedagogy to personal memoirs; and sexuality (in regards to feminism and politics of aesthetics and visual culture). Reel to Real: race, sex, and class at the movies (1996) collects film essays, reviews, and interviews with film directors. In The New Yorker, Hua Hsu said these interviews displayed the facet of hooks's work that was "curious, empathetic, searching for comrades".

In Feminist Theory: From Margin to Center (1984), hooks develops a critique of White feminist racism in second-wave feminism, which she argued undermined the possibility of feminist solidarity across racial lines.

As hooks argued, communication and literacy (the ability to read, write, and think critically) are necessary for the feminist movement because without them people may not grow to recognize gender inequalities in society.

In Teaching to Transgress (1994), hooks attempts a new approach to education for minority students. Particularly, hooks strives to make scholarship on theory accessible to "be read and understood across different class boundaries".

In 2002, hooks gave a commencement speech at Southwestern University. Eschewing the congratulatory mode of traditional commencement speeches, she spoke against what she saw as government-sanctioned violence and oppression, and admonished students who she believed went along with such practices. The Austin Chronicle reported that many in the audience booed the speech, though "several graduates passed over the provost to shake her hand or give her a hug".

In 2004, she joined Berea College as Distinguished Professor in Residence. Her 2008 book, belonging: a culture of place, includes an interview with author Wendell Berry as well as a discussion of her move back to Kentucky. She was a scholar in residence at The New School on three occasions, the last time in 2014. Also in 2014, the bell hooks Institute was founded at Berea College; in 2017 she donated her papers to the college.

During her time at Berea College, hooks founded the bell hooks center along with professor Dr. M. Shadee Malaklou. The center was established to provide underrepresented students, especially Black and brown, femme, queer, and Appalachian individuals at Berea College, a safe space where they can develop their activist expression, education, and work. The center cites hooks's work and her emphasis on the importance of feminism and love as the inspiration and guiding principles of the education it offers. The center offers events and programming with an emphasis on radical feminist and anti-racist thought.

She was often critical of the films of Spike Lee. In her essay, "Spike Lee Doing Malcolm X: Denying Black Pain", hooks argues that Lee's "film does not compel viewers to confront, challenge, and change. It embraces and rewards passive response - inaction. It encourages us to weep, but not to fight." She saw Lee as an "insider" to the film industry, making a film for predominantly White audiences that followed the conventions of "other Hollywood epic ... fictive biographies". She described the first half of the film as being half "neo-minstrel spectacle" and half "tragic"; criticised the portrayal of Malcolm's relationship with Sophia as having the "same shallowness of vision" as Lee's other filmic portrayals of interracial relationships; and disavowed Denzel Washington's potential to escape his reputation as "everybody's nice guy", meaning that he could never portray Malcolm's "'threatening' physical presence". All of which made Malcolm "appear less militant, more open". In her reading of the film, Lee is "primarily fascinated by Malcolm's fierce critique of White racism" and his early view of racism as "a masculinist phallocentric struggle for power between White men and Black men". Thus, the film missed Malcolm's later politics in which he had a "critique of racism in conjunction with imperialism and colonialism" and the film "certainly" did not contain Malcolm's "critique of capitalism". She also said that Lee wrote Black women in the same objectifying way that White male filmmakers write the characters of White women.

She also criticized the documentary Paris Is Burning for depicting the ritual of the balls as a spectacle to "pleasure" White spectators.

She was inducted into the Kentucky Writers Hall of Fame in 2018.

In 2020, during the George Floyd protests, there was a resurgence of interest in hooks's work on racism, feminism, and capitalism.

== Personal life and death ==
Regarding her sexual identity, hooks described herself as "queer-pas-gay". She used pas from the French language, translating to not in the English language. She describes being queer in her own words as follows: "As the essence of queer, I think of Tim Dean's work on being queer, and queer not as being about who you're having sex with—that can be a dimension of it—but queer as being about the self that is at odds with everything around it, and it has to invent and create and find a place to speak and to thrive and to live." During an interview with Abigail Bereola in 2017, hooks revealed that she was single while they discussed her love life, saying "I don't have a partner. I've been celibate for 17 years. I would love to have a partner, but I don't think my life is less meaningful."

On December 15, 2021, bell hooks died from kidney failure at her home in Berea, Kentucky, aged 69.

=== Buddhism ===
Through her interest in Beat poetry and after an encounter with the poet and Buddhist Gary Snyder, hooks was introduced to Buddhism in her early college years. She described herself as finding Buddhism as part of a personal journey in her youth, centered on seeking to recenter love and spirituality in her life and configure these concepts into her focus on activism and justice. After her initial exposure to Buddhism, hooks incorporated it into her Christian upbringing and this combined Christian-Buddhist thought influenced her identity, activism, and writing for the remainder of her life.

She was drawn to Buddhism because of the personal and academic framework it offered her to understand and respond to suffering and discrimination as well as love and connection. She describes the Christian-Buddhist focus on everyday practice as fulfilling the centering and grounding needs of her everyday life.

Buddhist thought, especially the work of Thích Nhất Hạnh, appears in many of hooks's essays, books, and poetry. Buddhist spirituality also played a significant role in the creation of love ethic which became a major focus in both her written work and her activism.

== Legacy and impact ==
Utne Reader's 1995 "100 Visionaries Who Could Change Your Life" includes hooks, as does TIME magazine's "100 Women of the Year" in 2020, where she was described as "that rare rock star of a public intellectual who reaches wide by being accessible".

Prior to her tenure at Berea College, hooks held teaching positions at esteemed institutions like Stanford (as a guest-lecturer), Yale, and The City College of New York. Her influence transcends academia, as evidenced by her residencies both in the United States and abroad. In 2014, St. Norbert College dedicated an entire year to celebrating her contributions with "A Year of bell hooks".

The popularity of hooks's writing surged amidst the racial justice movements ignited by the deaths of George Floyd and Breonna Taylor in 2020, with her book All About Love: New Visions entering the New York Times bestseller list over 20 years after its publication.

== Films ==
- Black is... Black Ain't (1994)
- Give a Damn Again (1995)
- Cultural Criticism and Transformation (1997)
- My Feminism (1997)
- Voices of Power (1999)
- BaadAsssss Cinema (2002)
- I Am a Man: Black Masculinity in America (2004)
- Happy to Be Nappy and Other Stories of Me (2004)
- Is Feminism Dead? (2004)
- Fierce Light: When Spirit Meets Action (2008)
- Occupy Love (2012)
- Hillbilly (2018)

== Awards and nominations ==
- Yearning: Race, Gender, and Cultural Politics: The American Book Awards / Before Columbus Foundation Award (1991)
- bell hooks: The Writer's Award from the Lila Wallace–Reader's Digest Fund (1994)
- Happy to Be Nappy: NAACP Image Award nominee (2001)
- Homemade Love: The Bank Street College Children's Book of the Year (2002)
- Salvation: Black People and Love: Hurston/Wright Legacy Award nominee (2002)
- bell hooks: Utne Reader's "100 Visionaries Who Could Change Your Life"
- bell hooks: The Atlantic Monthly's "One of our nation's leading public intellectuals"
- bell hooks: Time 100 Women of the Year, 2020

== Published works ==
=== Adult books ===
- And There We Wept: poems. Los Angeles, California: Golemics. 1978. OCLC 6230231.
- Ain't I a Woman?: Black women and feminism. Boston, Massachusetts: South End Press. 1981. ISBN 978-0-89608-129-1.
- Feminist Theory: From Margin to Center. South End Press. 1984. ISBN 978-0-89608-613-5.
- Talking Back: Thinking feminist, thinking Black. Between the Lines. 1989. ISBN 978-0-921284-09-3. Excerpted in Busby, Margaret, ed. (1992). Daughters of Africa. New York, New York: Pantheon Books.
- Yearning: Race, Gender, and Cultural Politics. Boston, Massachusetts: South End Press. 1990. ISBN 978-1-1-38821-75-0.
- With Cornel West, Breaking bread: insurgent Black intellectual life. Boston, Massachusetts: South End Press. 1991. ISBN 978-0-89608-414-8.
- Black Looks: Race and representation. Boston, Massachusetts: South End Press. 1992. ISBN 978-0-89608-434-6.
- Sisters of the Yam: Black women and self-recovery. Boston, Massachusetts: South End Press. 1993. ISBN 978-1138821682.
- Teaching to transgress: education as the practice of freedom. New York: Routledge. 1994. ISBN 978-0-415-90808-5.
- Outlaw Culture: Resisting Representations. New York: Routledge. 1994. ISBN 978-0-415-90811-5.
- Killing rage: ending racism. New York: Henry Holt and Co. 1995. ISBN 978-0-8050-5027-1.
- Art on my mind: visual politics. New York: The New Press. 1995. ISBN 978-1-56584-263-2.
- Reel to Real: Race, Sex, and Class at the Movies. Psychology Press. 1996. ISBN 978-0-415-91824-4.
- Bone Black: Memories of Girlhood. New York: Henry Holt & Co. 1996. ISBN 978-0-8050-4146-0.
- Wounds of Passion: A writing life. New York: Henry Holt & Co. 1997. ISBN 978-0-8050-5722-5.
- Remembered Rapture: the writer at work. Henry Holt and Co. 1999. ISBN 978-0-8050-5910-6.
- All About Love: New Visions. New York: William Morrow. 1999. ISBN 978-0-06-095947-0.
- Justice: childhood love lessons. HarperCollins. 2000. ISBN 978-0-688-16844-5.
- Feminism is for everybody: passionate politics. Cambridge, Massachusetts: South End Press. 2000. ISBN 978-0-89608-628-9.
- Where we stand: class matters (PDF). Routledge. 2000. ISBN 978-0-415-92913-4. Archived from the original (PDF) on July 14, 2021.
- Salvation: Black people and love. New York: Perennial. 2001. ISBN 978-0-06-095949-4.
- Communion: the female search for love. New York, New York: Perennial. 2002. ISBN 978-0-06-093829-1.
- Teaching community: a pedagogy of hope. New York: Routledge. 2003. ISBN 978-0-415-96818-8.
- Rock my soul: Black people and self-esteem. New York, New York: Atria Books. 2003. ISBN 978-0-7434-5605-0.
- The will to change: men, masculinity, and love. New York: Atria Books. 2004. ISBN 978-0-7434-5607-4. OCLC 53930053.
- We Real Cool: Black Men and Masculinity. New York, New York: Routledge. 2004. ISBN 978-0-203-64220-7.
- Soul Sister: Women, Friendship, and Fulfillment. Cambridge, Massachusetts: South End Press. 2005. ISBN 978-0-89608-735-4.
- With Amalia Mesa-Bains, Homegrown: engaged cultural criticism. Cambridge, Massachusetts: South End Press. 2006. ISBN 978-0-89608-759-0.
- Belonging: a culture of place. New York, New York: Routledge. 2009. ISBN 978-0-203-88801-8.
- Teaching Critical Thinking: practical wisdom. New York, New York: Routledge. 2010. ISBN 978-0-415-96820-1.
- Appalachian Elegy: poetry and place. Kentucky Voices Series. Lexington: University Press of Kentucky. 2012. ISBN 978-0-8131-3669-1.
- Writing Beyond Race: Living Theory and Practice. New York, NY: Routledge. 2013. ISBN 978-0-415-53914-2.
- With Stuart Hall, Uncut Funk: A Contemplative Dialogue, Foreword by Paul Gilroy. New York, NY: Routledge. 2018. ISBN 978-1138102101.

=== Children's books ===
- Happy to Be Nappy. Chris Raschka (illustrator). Little, Brown Books for Young Readers. 1990. ISBN 978-0-7868-2377-2.
- Homemade Love. New York: Hyperion Books for Children. 2002. ISBN 978-0786825530.
- Be boy buzz. New York: Hyperion Books for Children. 2002. ISBN 978-0786816439.
- Skin Again. Chris Raschka (illustrator). New York: Hyperion Books for Children. 2004. ISBN 978-0-7868-0825-0.
- Grump Groan Growl. Chris Raschka (illustrator). Little, Brown Books for Young Readers. 2008. ISBN 978-0-7868-0816-8.

=== Book sections ===
- hooks, bell (1993), "Black women and feminism", in Richardson, Laurel; Taylor, Verta A. (eds.), Feminist frontiers III, New York: McGraw-Hill, pp. 444–449, ISBN 978-0075570011.
- hooks, bell (1996), "Continued devaluation of Black womanhood", in Jackson, Stevi; Scott, Sue (eds.), Feminism and sexuality: a reader, New York: Columbia University Press, pp. 216–223, ISBN 978-0231107082.
- hooks, bell (1997), "Sisterhood: political solidarity between women", in McClintock, Anne; Mufti, Aamir; Shohat, Ella (eds.), Dangerous liaisons: gender, nation, and postcolonial perspectives, Minnesota, Minneapolis: University of Minnesota Press, pp. 396–414, ISBN 978-0816626496.
- hooks, bell (2004), "Selling hot pussy: representations of Black female sexuality in the cultural marketplace", in Richardson, Laurel; Taylor, Verta A.; Whittier, Nancy (eds.), Feminist frontiers (5th ed.), Boston: McGraw-Hill, pp. 119–127, ISBN 978-0072824230. Pdf.
- hooks, bell (2005), "Black women: shaping feminist theory", in Cudd, Ann E.; Andreasen, Robin O. (eds.), Feminist theory: a philosophical anthology, Oxford, UK; Malden, Massachusetts: Blackwell Publishing, pp. 60–68, ISBN 978-1405116619.
- hooks, bell (2009), "Lorde: The Examination of Justice", in Byrd, Rudolph P.; Cole, Johnnette Betsch; Guy-Sheftall, Beverly (eds.), I Am Your Sister: Collected and Unpublished Writings of Audre Lorde, New York: Oxford University Press, pp. 242–248, ISBN 978-0199846450.
