= University of Kindia =

University in Kindia, Guinea

Coordinates: 9°59′42″N 12°54′40″W

The University of Kindia is a public university in West Africa, located in the sub-prefecture of Damakania (Kindia), the regional capital of Lower Guinea.

== History ==
In 1929, a French planter, General Daloze, settled in Foulayah for fruit production. In 1946, it was established as a fruit research station under the French Institute for Colonial Fruits and Citrus Fruits (IFAC).

After independence in 1961, IFAC was replaced by the Fruit Research Institute (I.R.F), under the Ministry of Rural Economy and Handicrafts.

Following the transfer of the National School of Agriculture (ENA) to Faranah, it became the Faculty of Agronomy.

In 1983, it was renamed the Agricultural Research Center of Foulayah. Under the Ministry of Agriculture and the Ministry of National Education, it underwent several name changes.

Between 1993 and 1995, the center was established as the Department of Biology and Chemistry, followed by the Faculty of Law and Economic Sciences.

In 2004, the Preparatory School of Engineers (EPI) was created in Foulayah.

In 2006, it became the University Center of Kindia (CUK) and, since 2016, has been known as the University of Kindia (UK).

== Organization ==
The University of Kindia (UK) is a public scientific, pedagogical, technical, and professional educational institution under the supervision of the Ministry of Higher Education and Scientific Research. It was created by ministerial decree N°6303/MESRS/CAB/ of 21/10/2016, in application of decree N°0888/PRG/SGG/90 of 14 April 1990.

=== List of Rectors ===
N°	First and Last Name	Start date	End date
1	Jacques Kourouma		2019-09-11
2	Prof. Daniel Lamah	2019-09-11	2023-10-18
3	Prof. Akoi Massa Zoumanigui	2023-10-18	Incumbent

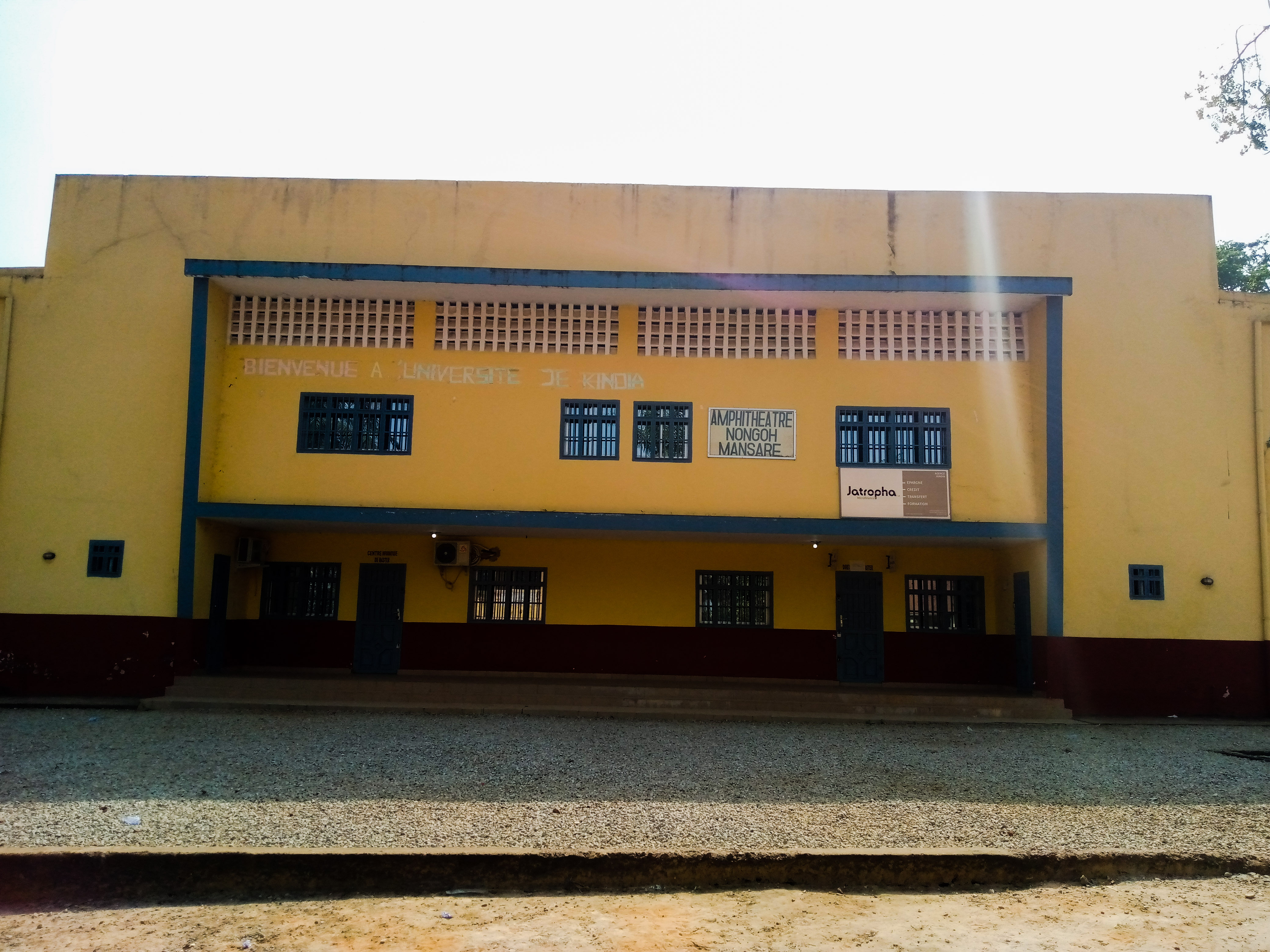
The Nongo Mansaré Amphitheater of the University of Kindia

== Gallery ==
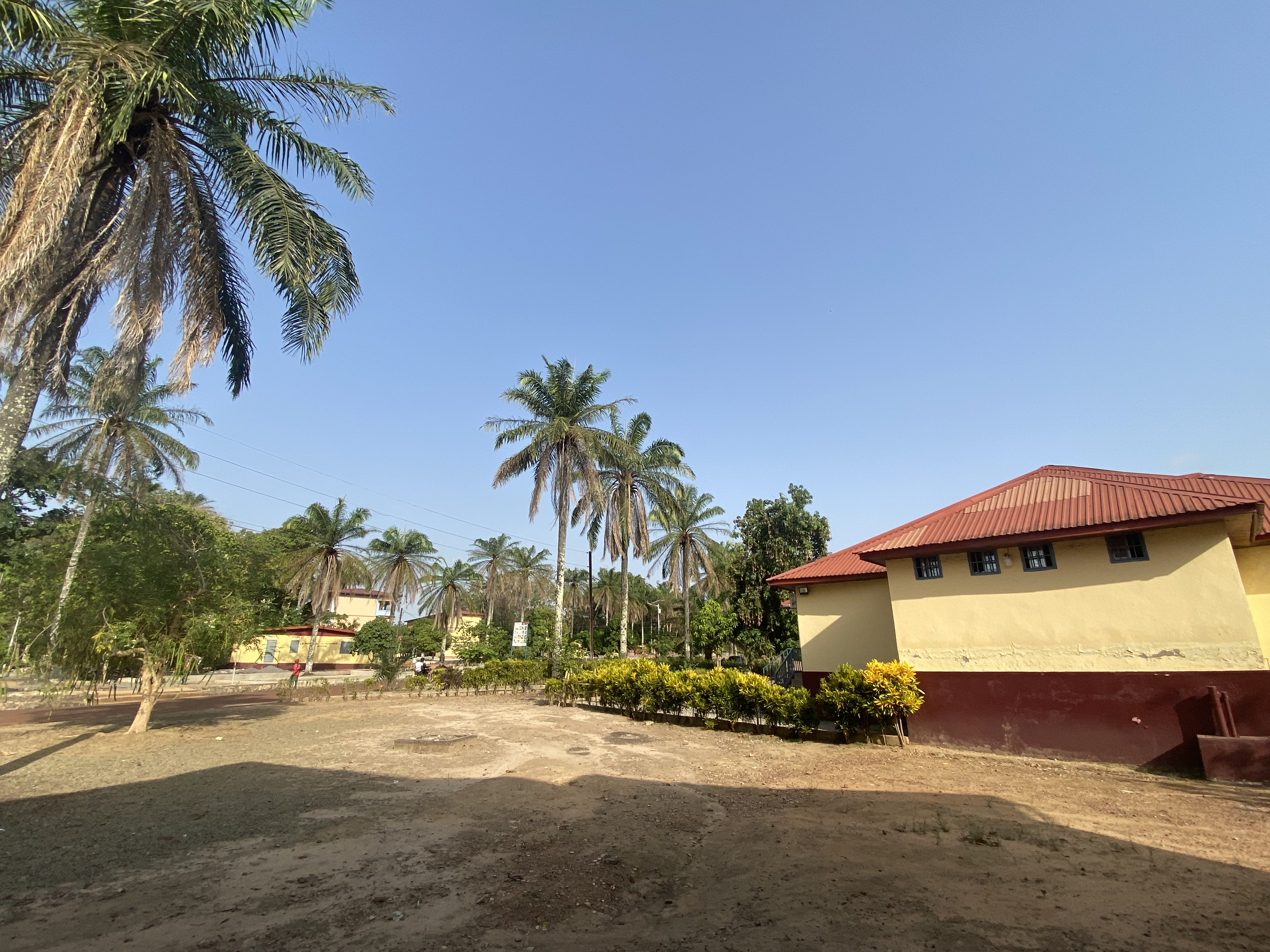

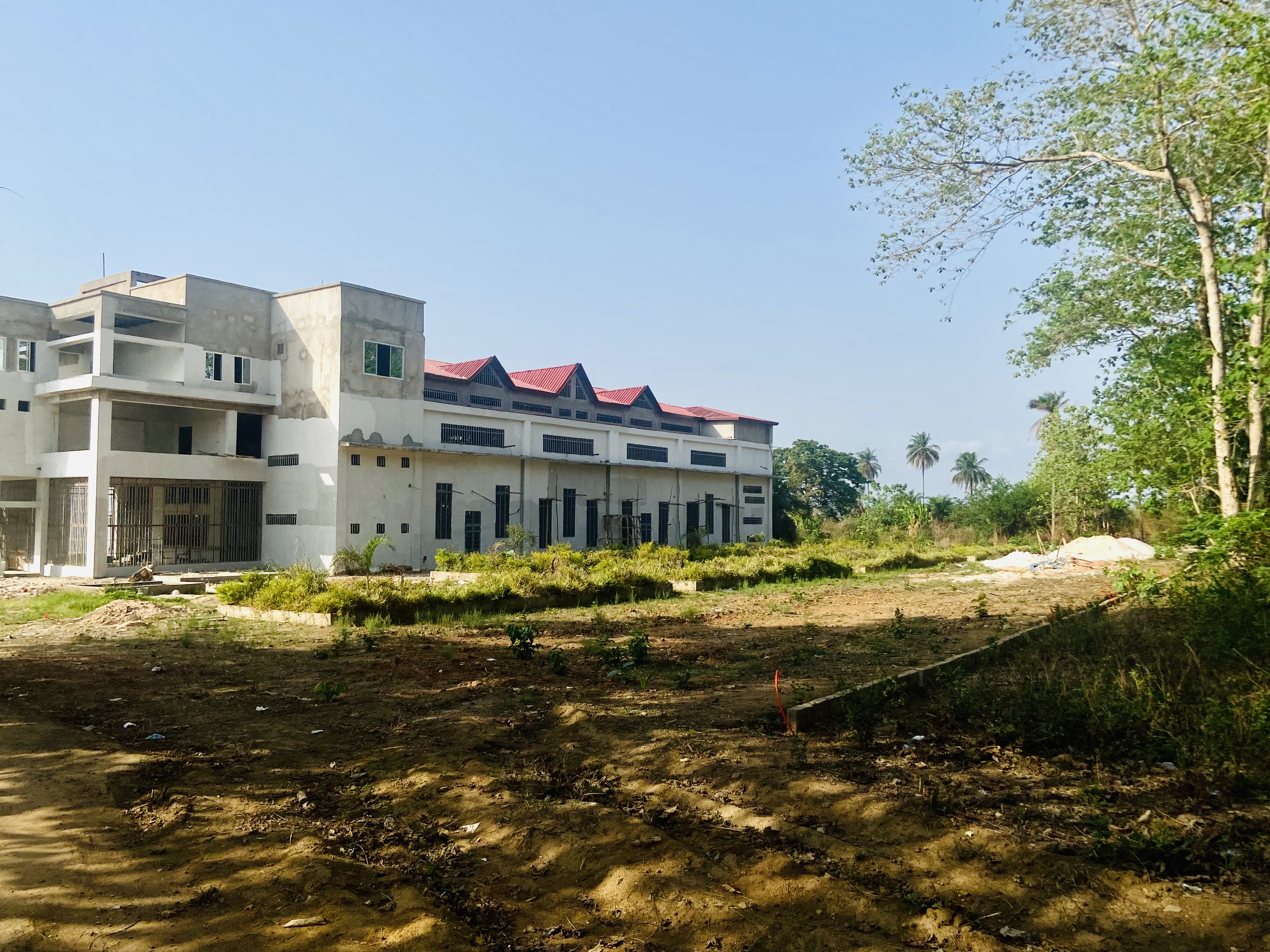
The new amphitheater

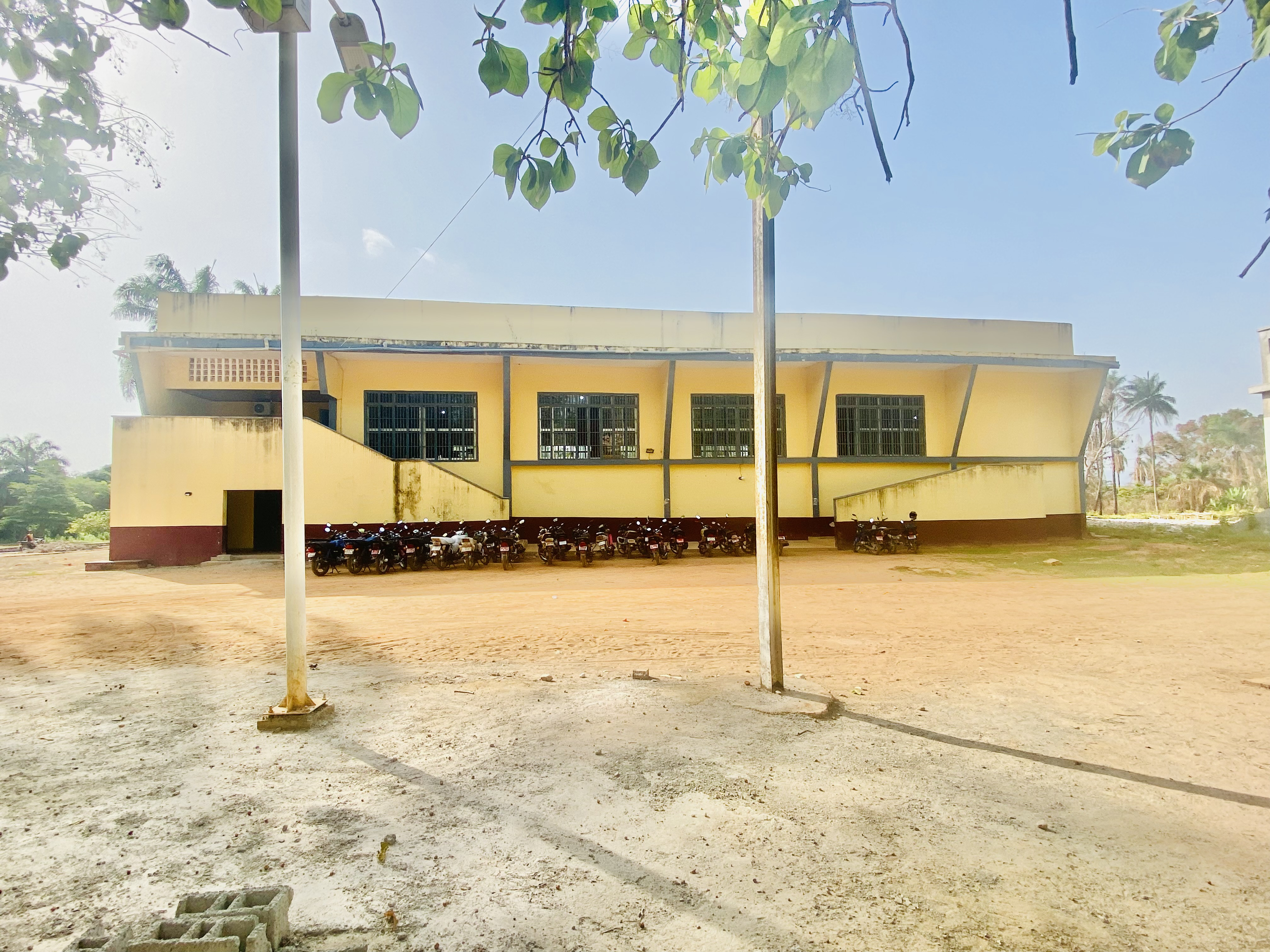
Nongo Mansaré Amphitheater

== Faculties ==
The University of Kindia comprises four faculties:

1. Faculty of Languages and Letters
2. Faculty of Social Sciences
3. Faculty of Economics and Management
4. Faculty of Sciences.

== See also ==
- Julius Nyerere University of Kankan
- Gamal Abdel Nasser University of Conakry
