= Awa Thiam =

Senegalese politician, academic, writer, and activist (1950)

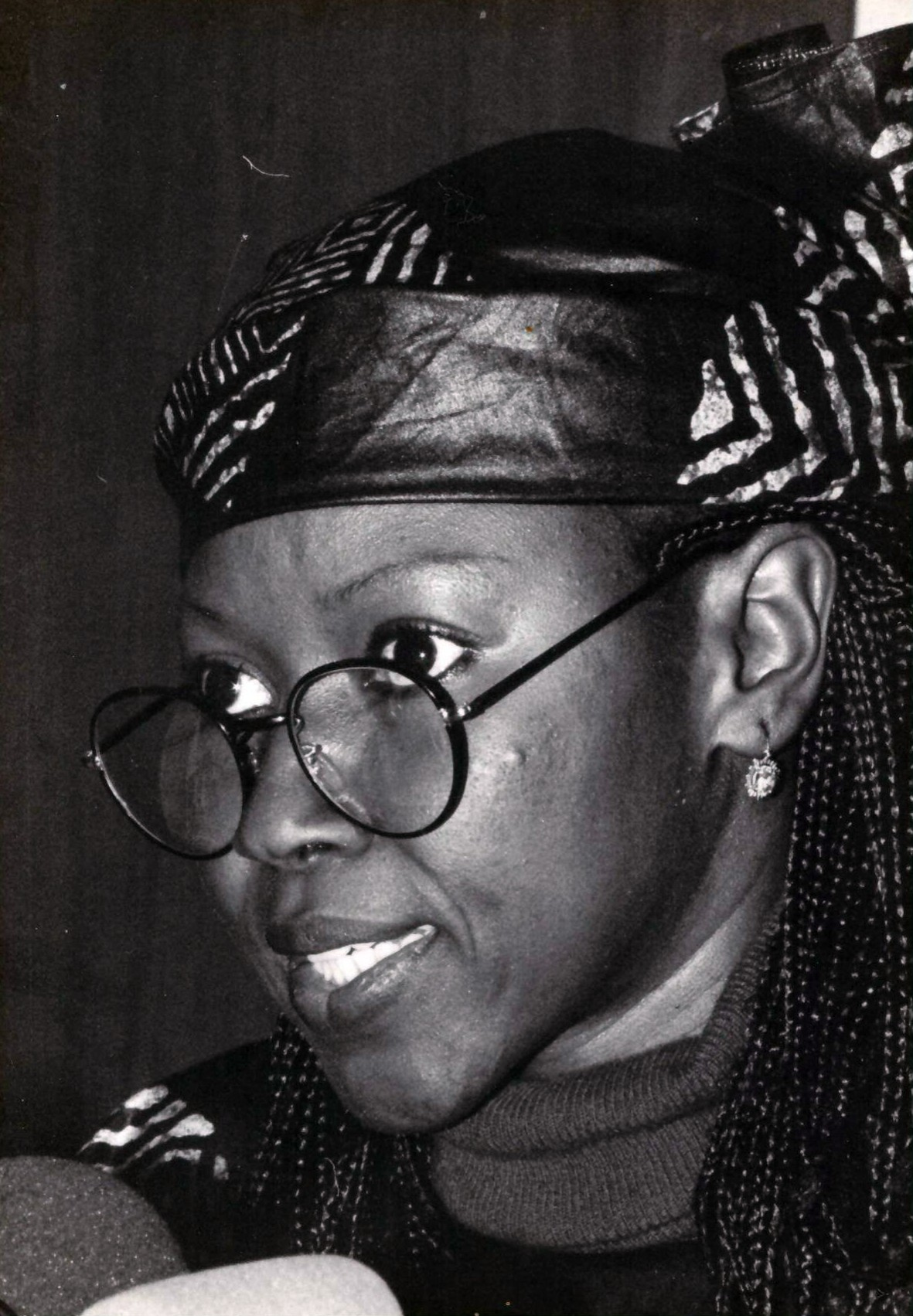
- Born: 1950 (age 75–76)
- Occupations: Politician, academic, writer, activist
- Notable work: Black Sisters, Speak Out: Feminism and Oppression in Black Africa

Awa Thiam (born 1950) is a Senegalese politician, academic, writer, and activist. She serves as Senegal's Director of the National Center for Assistance and Training of Women under the Ministry of Women and Children. She is an advocate against female genital mutilation (FGM), which she speaks on in her 1978 book La Parole aux négresses (also published in English in 1986 as Black Sisters, Speak Out: Feminism and Oppression in Black Africa). She has a body of work published internationally, in both French and English. In 1982, she founded the Commission pour l'Abolition des Mutilations Sexuelles (CAMS, or Commission for the Abolition of Sexual Mutilation, in English), which fights for the abolition of FGM. Thiam is among the women featured in the 1992 anthology Daughters of Africa edited by Margaret Busby.

== Career ==
After completing early education in her home country of Senegal, Awa Thiam moved to France for higher education. While there, she earned not only a Ph.D. in Cultural Anthropology from the University of Paris VIII, but also a Ph.D. in philosophy from Pantheon-Sorbonne Paris I. During her time in Europe, Thiam co-founded with Maria Kala Lobé, a Cameroonian feminist, the Coordination des Femmes Noires, which is known to be one of the first groups of black feminists in France.

Having gained multiple degrees overseas, Thiam returned to Senegal, and became assistant professor of Research at the Fundamental Institute of Black Africa at Cheikh Anta Diop University of Dakar. In 1987, Thiam petitioned the institution to build a Department of Anthropology of the Sexes, but her idea was ultimately rejected by the administration.

In pursuit of improving the lives and status of African women, Thiam was a founding member of the Commission of the Abolition of Sexual Mutilation (also known as CAMS or Commission pour l'Abolition des Mutilations Sexuelles, in French), which was later dissolved and resurrected as CAMS-International. She speaks extensively on the topic of female genital mutilation (FGM), claiming that the practice is merely a thinly veiled form of patriarchal control. In her article for International Social Science Journal, Thiam states: "the purpose of these practices, whether it is admitted or not, is to control female sexuality. Some indeed do not hesitate to say that the aim is to reduce women’s hyper-sensuality. In any case the result remains the same: to make the young girl essentially a future reproductive and productive element. Hence, her life is taken over and mapped out for her from birth to death by a patriarchal society, which ensures that she is kept in her place at all stages of her development."

Outside of the academic realm, Awa Thiam is the Minister of Health and Social Action, and Chair of the Committee on Health, Population, Social Affairs, and Solidarity. In addition, she is the Director of the National Center for Assistance and Training of Women under the Ministry of Women and Children. She is also a co-founder of the Alliance for a New Citizenship in Dakar.

== Impact ==
Thiam is a strong advocate for the abolition of female genital mutilation (FGM). Her book Black Sisters, Speak Out: Feminism and Oppression in Black Africa (also published in English as Speak Out, Black Sisters: Feminism and Oppression in Black Africa), which was originally published in French as La Parole aux négresses in 1978, addresses this topic in depth. The book, one of the first of its kind, holds interviews of survivors and calls for change. It also passes judgement on patriarchy for inciting violence against women, by women, stating that "it would seem that males have forced women to become their own torturers, to butcher each other."

While much of her work is in regard to fighting female genital mutilation in Africa, Thiam is also an activist against polygamy, forced motherhood, veiling, forced sterilization, and illiteracy. In her book, Black Sisters, Speak Out, she also stresses the importance of African women standing up for themselves and one another over white feminists trying to step in and fix African women, which she sees as just another type of colonialism. "People who understand nothing of ritual practices must beware of attacking them, especially when they base their judgment on criteria that bear no relationship to the mentalities of people in the society under consideration. The women of Black Africa have suffered enough from these colonial and neo-colonial attitudes."

While Thiam's work seeks to unite African women against FGM, her work has not always been well received by her African female audience. Even as her western audience have embraced Thiam's work, the audience she seeks to empower and activate has often not had the same response. Members of her African audience have asserted that Thiam does not understand why women may support FGM, and that she is not taking into account the culture as a whole when she writes about the need to abolish FGM.

Though there were many factors involved in the decision, the country of Senegal did, in fact, ban FGM in January 1999 in response to female activist speaking out against the practice. However, it is reported that while this is a political victory, it may have come due to the fact that the largest people group in power at that point, the Wolof, did not practise FGM. There is still a large resistance in the country to the eradication of FGM. Awa Thiam still works to improve public health for the country of Senegal as Minister of Health and Social Action, and Chair of the Committee .

Awa Thiam has also been honoured with the French governmental Medal for the Defense of Women's Rights.

== Selected works ==
- Black Sisters, Speak Out: Feminism and Oppression in Black Africa (La Parole aux négresses, 1978; English-language transl. Dorothy Blair), London: Pluto, 1986. Extracted in Margaret Busby (ed.), Daughters of Africa, 1992, pp. 476–478.
- "Women’s fight for the abolition of sexual mutilation", International Social Science Journal, Volume 50, Issue 157, p. 381–386.
- Continents Noirs (Collection Femmes et Societes), Tierce, 1987, ISBN 978-2903144395.
- Essay "Feminism and Revolution", in I Am Because We Are: Readings in Africana Philosophy
