= Ain't I a Woman (book) =

1981 Black feminist book by bell hooks

- Cover of the first edition
- Author: bell hooks
- Language: English
- Subject: Black feminism
- Publisher: South End Press
- Publication date: 1981
- Publication place: United States
- Media type: Print
- Pages: 220 (second edition)
- ISBN: 0-89608-129-X

Ain't I a Woman: Black Women and Feminism is a 1981 book by bell hooks titled after Sojourner Truth's "Ain't I a Woman?" speech that was delivered in 1851 at a women's rights convention in Ohio, with Truth questioning the treatment she typically receives as a black woman. Drawing on such historical context, hooks examines the effect of racism and sexism on Black women, the civil rights movement, and feminist movements from suffrage to the 1970s. She argues that the convergence of sexism and racism during slavery contributed to Black women having the lowest status and worst conditions of any group in American society. White female abolitionists and suffragists were often more comfortable with Black male abolitionists such as Frederick Douglass, while southern segregationalists and stereotypes of Black female promiscuity and immorality caused protests whenever Black women spoke. Hooks points out that these white female reformers were more concerned with white morality than the conditions these morals caused Black Americans.

Further, she argues that the stereotypes that were set during slavery still affect Black women today. She argued that slavery allowed white society to stereotype white women as the pure goddess virgin and move Black women to the seductive whore stereotype formerly placed on all women, thus justifying the devaluation of Black femininity and rape of Black women. The work which Black women have been forced to perform, either in slavery or in a discriminatory workplace, that would be non-gender conforming for white women has been used against Black women as a proof of their emasculating behavior. hooks argues that Black nationalism was largely a patriarchal and misogynist movement, seeking to overcome racial divisions by strengthening sexist ones, and that it readily latched onto the idea of the emasculating Black matriarch proposed by Daniel Patrick Moynihan, whose theories bell hooks often criticizes.

Meanwhile, she says, the "feminist movement", a largely white middle and upper class affair, did not articulate the needs of poor and non-white women, thus reinforcing sexism, racism, and classism. She suggests this explains the low numbers of Black women who participated in the feminist movement in the 1970s, pointing to Louis Harris' Virginia Slims poll done in 1972 for Philip Morris that she says showed 62 percent of Black women supported "efforts to change women's status" and 67 percent "sympathized with the women's rights movement", compared with 45 and 35 percent of white women (also Steinem, 1972).

== Reception ==
Since its publication, Ain't I a Woman has been critically acclaimed as groundbreaking in the study of feminist theory for discussing the correlation between the history of oppression Black women have faced in the United States and its lingering effects in modern American society. Ain't I a Woman is praised for tackling the intersection of race and gender that marginalizes Black women. hooks' writing has also opened the door for other Black women to write and theorize about similar topics. The book is commonly used in gender studies, Black studies, and philosophy courses.

The work has led to some criticism of her being "ahistorical, unscholarly (there were many complaints about the absence of footnotes), and homophobic". She does not provide a bibliography for any of her work, making it difficult to find the editors and publication information for the pieces listed under the "notes" section of her work. In "Theory as Liberatory Practice", hooks explains that her lack of conventional academic format was "motivated by the desire to be inclusive, to reach as many readers as possible in as many different locations as possible".

In a book review of hooks' Remembered Rapture: The Writer at Work, Nicole Abraham criticizes hooks' unconventional format rationalization. Abraham suggests that, if her rationalization for not providing footnotes and bibliographic information in her writing is that it will help her reach a broader, presumably less academic audience, hooks either assumes that the average person is uninterested in pursuing her sources and ideas or implies that her readers are too lazy or unsophisticated for proper endnotes.

== See also ==
- Black feminism
