= Leila J. Rupp =

American historian (born 1950)

- Born: 1950 (age 75–76)
- Education: Bryn Mawr College (PhD)
- Occupation: Historian
- Partner: Verta Taylor

Leila J. Rupp (born 1950) is an American historian, feminist, and professor of Feminist Studies at the University of California, Santa Barbara. She is an alumna of Bryn Mawr College, a member of the Seven Sisters women's colleges, where she received her bachelor's degree in 1972 as well as Ph.D. in 1976, both in history. Her areas of interest include women's movements, sexuality, and queer and women's history.

Rupp was a professor of history and women's studies for 25 years at Ohio State, and the university's first faculty member in women's studies, before joining the faculty of University of California, Santa Barbara in 2002.

Rupp is known for her numerous and critically-acclaimed books on women's and queer history and feminist studies, including Survival in the Doldrums (with Verta Taylor, published by Oxford University Press), Worlds of Women (Princeton University Press), A Desired Past (University of Chicago Press, and a finalist for the "Lesbian Studies" category of the Lambda Literary Awards), Drag Queens at the 801 Cabaret (with Verta Taylor, University of Chicago Press, winner of the Distinguished Book Award of the Sex and Gender Section of the American Sociological Association), and Sapphistries: A Global History of Love Between Women (New York University Press). SFGate described Sapphistries as "a fascinating and at times startling transnational history" that begins in 40,000 B.C. and ends it in modern times. In 2015, Rupp won the prestigious Lambda Literary Award for her co-edited anthology (with Susan Freeman) Understanding and Teaching U.S. Lesbian, Gay, Bisexual, and Transgender History (University of Wisconsin Press, 2014).

She is coeditor of 5 editions of Feminist Frontiers, a pioneering text in women's, gender, and sexuality studies, and author of numerous articles in feminist studies, history, and social science journals. She was cohost of the podcast Queer America, sponsored by the Southern Poverty Law Center's Teaching Tolerance project.

In 2016, the American Historical Association offered the session “Transforming Women’s History: Leila Rupp — Scholar, Editor, and Mentor,” in which five prominent scholars honored Rupp's scholarship by detailing her impact on the field. Rupp was the editor of the Journal of Women's History from 1996 to 2004.

An out lesbian, her partner is Verta Taylor, with whom she coauthored several works.

== Publications ==
- Leila J. Rupp: Transnational Women's Movements, European History Online, Mainz: Institute of European History, 2011, retrieved: June 22, 2011.
- Leila J. Rupp, Sapphistries: A Global History of Love Between Women (New York: New York University Press, 2009).
- Leila J. Rupp and Verta Taylor, Drag Queens at the 801 Cabaret (Chicago: University of Chicago Press, 2003). xiii, 256 p. : ill.; 24 cm. ISBN 978-0-226-73158-2
- Leila J. Rupp, A Desired Past: A Short History of Same-Sex Love in America (Chicago: University of Chicago Press, 1999, paperback 2002).
- Vytou_ená minulost [Czech translation, by Vera Sokolová] (Prague: One Woman Press, 2001).
- Leila J. Rupp, Worlds of Women: The Making of an International Women's Movement (Princeton: Princeton University Press, 1997).
- Leila J. Rupp and Verta Taylor, Survival in the Doldrums: The American Women's Rights Movement, 1945 to the 1960s (New York: Oxford University Press, 1987; Columbus: Ohio State University Press [paperback edition], 1990).

Excerpt reprinted in Perspectives on the American Past (Lexington, MA: D.C. Heath, forthcoming).

- Leila J. Rupp, Mobilizing Women for War: German and American Propaganda, 1939-1945 (Princeton: Princeton University Press, 1978).
