= Thierno Diawo =

Guinean writer (1900–1984)

Thierno Diawo Pellel (born Thierno Mamadou Diawo Diallo; c. 1900 in Labé, Guinea (AOF) – 1984 in Labé), was one of the great twentieth century poets of Fouta Djallon.

The son of Môdi Abdoulaye Diallo, he was named Chief of Mouminia by the Fouta elite and developed in a strict environment, deeply marked by devotion to Islam. He did not know his father, who was killed while performing his duties in 1907. The young Thierno Diallo was then raised to authority by his elder sisters.

Pellel received the usual education for a scion of Fouta noble families (lasili).

At the age of 25, he became a student of the great scholar Thierno Aliou. He studied with him until his death two years later. He married one of his nieces, Aissatou Donghol, with whom he had seven children.

Thierno Diawo Pellel is especially well known for his edition of a poem of 409 couplets which praises the great men of Fouta.
