= All About Love: New Visions =

2000 book by bell hooks

- Author: bell hooks
- Subject: Psychology
- Genre: Self-help book
- Publisher: Harper
- Publication date: December 22, 1999
- Publication place: United States
- Media type: Print
- Pages: 272 pp
- ISBN: 0-06-095947-9
- OCLC: 45955184
- Dewey Decimal: 306.7 (Alameda County Library)

All About Love: New Visions is a book by bell hooks published on December 22, 1999, that discusses aspects of love in modern society. The book is organized into thirteen chapters, in which each chapter discusses an aspect of love. Within these chapters, hooks also provides the reader with reflections on her own journey of love, as well as analysis of society's teachings of love.

== Preface ==
In the preface of the book, bell hooks writes about being abandoned by love in her girlhood. While she does not provide the reader with context to the details of that abandonment, hooks reflects to the reader that she realised that all the years she was looking for love, she was truly longing to heal from the initial abandonment. hooks writes that when she finally got herself moved on from that incident and ready to love in the present, she felt that the world she lives in (our world) became "loveless." hooks ends the preface of the book with an explanation of why she chooses to write about love. She writes, "I write of love to bear witness both to the danger in this movement, and to call for a return to love. Redeemed and restored, love returns us to the promise of everlasting life. When we love, we can let our hearts speak."

== Chapter analysis ==
=== Clarity: Give Love Words ===
- In the first chapter of the book, bell hooks describes how love is used but no one quite knows the definition of it. hooks says that the definition that she finds most fitting is the one that M. Scott Peck uses. As mentioned in the book, Peck defines love as "the will to extend one's self for the purpose of nurturing one's own, or another's spiritual growth...Love is an act of will—namely, both an intention and an action. Will also implies choice. We do not have to love. We choose to love."

=== Honesty: Be True to Love ===
In this section, bell hooks discusses why in particular the act of loving has changed recently. hooks discusses how women are "encouraged by sexist socialization to pretend and manipulate, to lie as a way to please" and how men are taught to create a false self that is not vulnerable, as a way to remain powerful.

- "To know love we have to tell the truth to ourselves and others. Creating a false self to mask fears and insecurities has become so common that many of us forget who we are and what we feel underneath the pretense. Breaking through this detail is always the first step in uncovering our longing to be honest and clear."
- "The wounded child inside many males is a boy who, when he first spoke his truths, was silenced by a paternal sadism, by a patriarchal world that did not want him to claim his true feelings. The wounded child inside females is a girl who was taught in early childhood that she must become something other than herself, deny her true feelings, in order to attract and please others ... To be loving we must willingly hear each other's truth, and most importantly, we affirm the value of truth telling."
