= Thierno Aliou =

Guinean writer and judge (1850–1927)

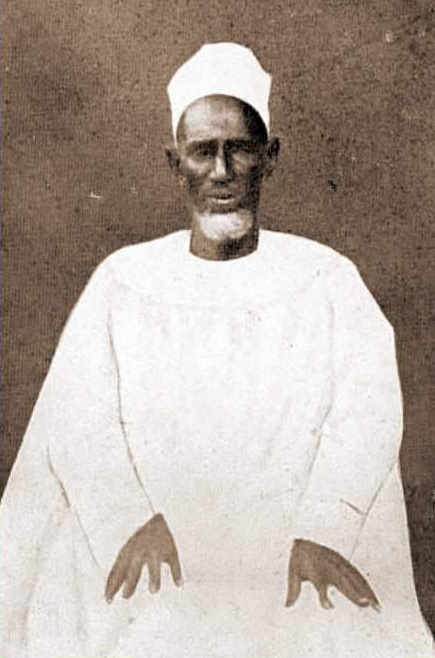

Thierno Aliou Bhoubha Ndian (Thierno Aliou Bah; c. 1850 in Donghol – 23 March 1927 at Labé) was an important Fula author, Muslim theologian and politician in Fouta-Djalon, French West Africa.

== Biography ==
=== Ancestry ===
Thierno Aliou was descended from Ali Kali Doukouré. Ali Kali was originally a Fulani from the clan of Bah or Ourourbhe. However, he adopted the name Doukoure from the Sarakolle Chief who hosted him in Diafouna. When his grandson, Thierno Malal moved from Diafouna (modern Mali), he settled in Koin near a mountain, he named it Diafouna and also changed his last name back to Bah, his ancestor's original clan name.

Later he moved on to Labé and met Karamoko Alpha at Dimbin who offered him presents and an estate for his family, but he was content with a small plot for his grave which he dug himself. Astonished by such great virtue, Karamoko Alpha named him Imam Ratib - a title inherited by his son Thierno Abdourrahman, who served Karamoko Alpha in his new palace at Missidé Hindé (which was later left to the family of Modi Younoussa, great grandfather of Thierno Diawo Pellel) and died there.

Eventually, after Karamoko Alpha had settled definitively at Labé, he sent for the two children of Thierno Malal and the seven sons of Thierno Abdourrahman. He died ten years later, but the Imamate he had conferred continued to be inherited in the family of Thierno Malal, passing to Thierno Mamadou Bano, Thierno Mamadou and then to Thierno Aliou.

=== Education ===
Thierno Aliou studied the Quran under his father Thierno Mamadou; he completed his secondary and tertiary studies in the school of three great scholars of the time: his uncle Thierno Abdoulaye Ndouyêdio, Thierno Boubacar Poti Séléyanké of Dimbin and Thierno Abdourrahmane Kaldouyanké of Sombili (also called Thierno Doura).
He pursued the traditional subjects of the Islamic education (theology, Arabic language, literature, grammar, etc.). He mastered Arabic literature, which allowed him to write a number of works in this language and to serve as an interpreter for the Chiefs of Labé whenever they had Arab guests.

=== Period at Bhoubha Ndian ===
His last teacher (Thierno Doura) chose him over all the scholars of Fouta to translate a letter sent by the Arab chiefs of Alamamy; he thereby became known beyond the borders of Fouta and Guinea.

Alpha Ibrahima chose him as counselor for religious affairs; his son Alpha Yaya retained him as a confidant.

Thierno Aliou gained an estate 30 km from Labé after his uncle Thierno Abdourrahmane Talibé married one of his daughters to him and offered as a dowry all his various properties in the country (livestock, lands, crops, etc.). He then took the name Thierno Aliou Bhoubha Ndian. He remained at Bhouba Ndian for 24 years, dispensing justice, receiving students from all the communities of Fouta, especially the children of chiefs and nobles. He had only income from his fields and his commercial transactions to support the needs of his family and students, redistributing any gifts given to him.

=== Period at Madina ===
He moved to Madina, 75 km from Labé in 1898. There he encountered his uncle Modi Mamadou Samba, who married one of his daughters to him. He was named chief of the Ourourbhé (Bah, Baldé) of Dowsaré Labé, Kolia, Manda Saran, Soumma, Fétoyambi and Woundoudi. He built a mosque there and made it his place of spiritual retreat.

During the French colonisation of Guinea he became the principal judge of Labé, but he was replaced by his eldest son Thierno Siradiou in 1914.

After the administrative reform of 1912 he was named chief of the canton of Donghora - a role which he accepted without enthusiasm at the insistence of his friends and supporters who feared he would experience the repression which had befallen other scholars in Fouta. He reigned four years and was obliged to abdicate in 1916. However, he continued with his cultural and religious activities, including a presentation at a conference of African scholars organised at Dakar by the Governor General of French West Africa.

Thierno Aliou died on 23 March 1927 at the age of 80. He is buried in a plot near the great mosque which is currently directed by his son Thierno Abdourrahmane, his two grandsons El Hadj Ibrahima Caba and El Hadj Mamadou Badr, and El Hadj Aliou Teli Laria the grandson of his friend Thierno Mahmoudou Laria who was also Imam of the mosque of Labé.

Thierno Aliou left behind numerous children: Thierno Siradiou, Karamoko Bano, Thierno Lamine, Thierno Mamadou, Thierno Abdoulaye, Karamoko Chaikou, Thierno Habib, Thierno Abdourrahmane, Aguibou Oubaidoullahi Dai, Assiatou, Oussoumâni, Mariama Sira, Barratou Djiwo, Fatimatou Souadou, Diaraye, Kadiatou and Aissatou.
