= Verta Taylor =

Professor of sociology

Verta Ann Taylor
- Born: 1948 (age 77–78)
- Known for: Research on social movements, gender studies, sexuality studies, and women's health
- Awards: Distinguished Book Award (American Sociological Association), Simon and Gagnon Award, John D. McCarthy Lifetime Achievement Award, Jessie Bernard Award

Academic background
- Education: Indiana State University (BS), Ohio State University (MA, PhD)

Academic work
- Discipline: Sociology
- Institutions: Ohio State University, University of California, Santa Barbara
- Notable works: Survival in the Doldrums: The American Women's Rights Movement, 1945 to the 1960s, Rock-a-by Baby: Feminism, Self-Help, and Postpartum Depression, Drag Queens at the 801 Cabaret

Verta Ann Taylor (born 1948) is a professor of sociology at the University of California, Santa Barbara, with focuses on gender, sexuality, social movements, and women's health.

== Education and career ==
Taylor earned a degree in social work from Indiana State University in 1970, and then went to Ohio State University for graduate study in sociology, earning a master's degree in 1971 and completing her Ph.D. there in 1976.

She continued at Ohio State University as an assistant professor of sociology, affiliated with the Disaster Research Center, which she directed in 1977–1978, and with the Center for Women's Studies, for which she was acting director in 1984–1985. She was promoted to full professor at Ohio State in 1997. In 2002 she moved to the department of sociology at the University of California, Santa Barbara, also affiliated with the Feminist Studies Program there. She chaired the sociology department from 2005 to 2012. In 2012, she added an affiliation as a research associate of the Broom Center for Demography.

== Publications ==
Taylor has authored books including:

- Survival in the Doldrums: The American Women's Rights Movement, 1945 to the 1960s (with Leila J. Rupp, Oxford University Press, 1987)
- Rock-a-by Baby: Feminism, Self-Help, and Postpartum Depression (Routledge, 1996)
- Drag Queens at the 801 Cabaret (with Leila Rupp, University of Chicago Press, 2003)

Her edited volumes include:

- Feminist Frontiers: Rethinking Sex, Gender, and Society (edited with Laurel Richardson, Addison-Wesley, 1983)
- The Marrying Kind?: Debating Same-Sex Marriage within the Lesbian and Gay Movement (edited with Mary Bernstein, University of Minnesota, 2013)
- The Oxford Handbook of U.S. Women's Social Movement Activism (edited with Holly J. McCammon, Jo Reger, and Rachel L. Einwohner, Oxford University Press, 2017)

Other highly cited publications of Taylor include:

- "Social movement continuity: The women's movement in abeyance" (American Sociological Review, 1989)
- "Collective identity in social movement communities: Lesbian feminist mobilization" (with Nancy Whittier, in Frontiers in Social Movement Theory, 1992)
- "Analytical approaches to social movement culture: The culture of the women’s movement" (with Nancy Whittier, in Social Movements and Culture, 1995)
- "Semi-structured interviewing in social movement research" (with Kathleen M. Blee, in Methods of Social Movement Research, 2002)
- "'Get up, stand up': Tactical repertoires of social movements" (with Nella Van Dyke, in The Blackwell Companion to Social Movements, 2007)

== Recognition ==
Taylor's book Drag Queens at the 801 Cabaret won the distinguished book award of the Sex and Gender Section of the American Sociological Association in 2005.

She was given the Simon and Gagnon Award for Lifetime of Scholarly Contributions to the Study of Sexuality in 2008, the John D. McCarthy Lifetime Achievement Award in Social Movements in 2008, and the Jessie Bernard Award for Lifetime Contributions to the Study of Women in 2011.

== Personal life ==
An out lesbian, Taylor's wife is Leila J. Rupp, with whom she coauthored several works.
