= Nancy Whittier =

Nancy Whittier is an American sociologist and a professor at Smith College. She has written many books, including Feminist Generations, Feminist Frontiers 5, and The Politics of Child Sexual Abuse: Emotion, Social Movements, and the State.

She was born on September 16, 1966, and lives in Northampton, Massachusetts. Whittier also currently holds a Sophia Smith chair at Smith College.
