= Backtalker =

2026 book by Kimberlé Crenshaw

Backtalker: An American Memoir
- First edition cover
- Author: Kimberlé Williams Crenshaw
- Audio read by: Kimberlé Williams Crenshaw
- Language: English
- Subject: Memoir
- Publisher: Simon & Schuster
- Publication date: May 5, 2026
- Publication place: New York
- Media type: Print (hardcover)
- Pages: 400
- ISBN: 9781982181000

Backtalker: An American Memoir is a 2026 autobiography by legal scholar Kimberlé Crenshaw. Published by Simon & Schuster on May 5, the book details her early life and personal conceptualization of intersectionality and critical race theory (CRT). It also divulges into her reaction to the 2020s critical race theory controversies, simultaneously serving as a refutation of accusations that her work was a "European import" based on cultural Marxism and "identity politics on steroids". Chapters were originally written as introductory articles for a law review volume, but her agent sought to expand readership to the public.

== Life ==
Crenshaw was born on May 5, 1959 in Canton, Ohio to Marian and Walter Crenshaw, who she terms as "race men and women of the 20th century". Within the book dedicated to them, she discusses their influence on how she perceived race, with her mother being involved in the desegregation of a swimming pool at age 3 and father director of the Canton Metropolitan Housing Authority. They explicitly encouraged critical thought on conditions and later on Crenshaw witnessed her mother battle against urban renewal in her hometown Canton, Ohio affecting property inherited by her grandfather. Their lessons establish the "backtalking" throughline. In a Forbes interview, she explained it "implicitly brings into the frame the preexistence of authority, the preexisting power, that basically is telling us to accept, to sit down, to shut up and to go away. That is the essence of a fascist, authoritarian, white supremacist, patriarchal regime. That's what it's telling all of us. So what is it that we are to do in the face of that preexisting power? We talk back to it." Thereafter she follows her life course at Cornell University, Harvard Law School, and the University of Wisconsin, including her coining of the term intersectionality in 1989. The critical moment was the culmination of her Black feminist intellectual exploration via the thought of Maria W. Stewart, bell hooks, Deborah King, and the Combahee River Collective and assessment of DeGraffenreid v. General Motors (1976).

Contemporarily, she critiques Supreme Court Justice Clarence Thomas, contrasting his appeal to African-American heritage to that of his predecessor Thurgood Marshall. Such includes support of his accuser and her friend Anita Hill. She credits him as "gut[ting]" the Voting Rights Act and allowing for democratic backsliding in the United States in his decision in Citizens United v. FEC (2010). She then criticizes Barack Obama's "My Brother's Keeper Challenge" initiative's exclusion of girls, expounding in an NPR interview on the lack of funding for Black women-led organizations. This spreading awareness of how racism affected Black women extended to her organization African American Policy Forum's involvement in the #SayHerName movement. Her focus on present conditions examines the MAGA movement, deeming the 2020 controversies as arising out of Donald Trump and Fox News's adoption of fringe right-wing propagandists assertions that CRT was reverse discrimination. However, she also challenges institutions that failed to deliver on promises of diversity, equity, and inclusion.

== Reception ==
Using Crenshaw's recalling of an assault from who she solely refers to as "Boyfriend From Hell" (BFH) as an example, Colin Grant of The New York Times asserts, "That the precise prose of this account, and numerous other anecdotes, is written with the kind of titanic certainty that would sway a jury is expected; what's surprising, however, is Crenshaw’s candor in revealing her vulnerability and disappointments." By May 21, it was #14 in The New York Times Bestseller List.

Booklist referred to it as "a personal, passionate reminder that sustained freedom to think, communicate, and protest is the best defense against the backslide of progress."
