= SayHerName =

American social movement

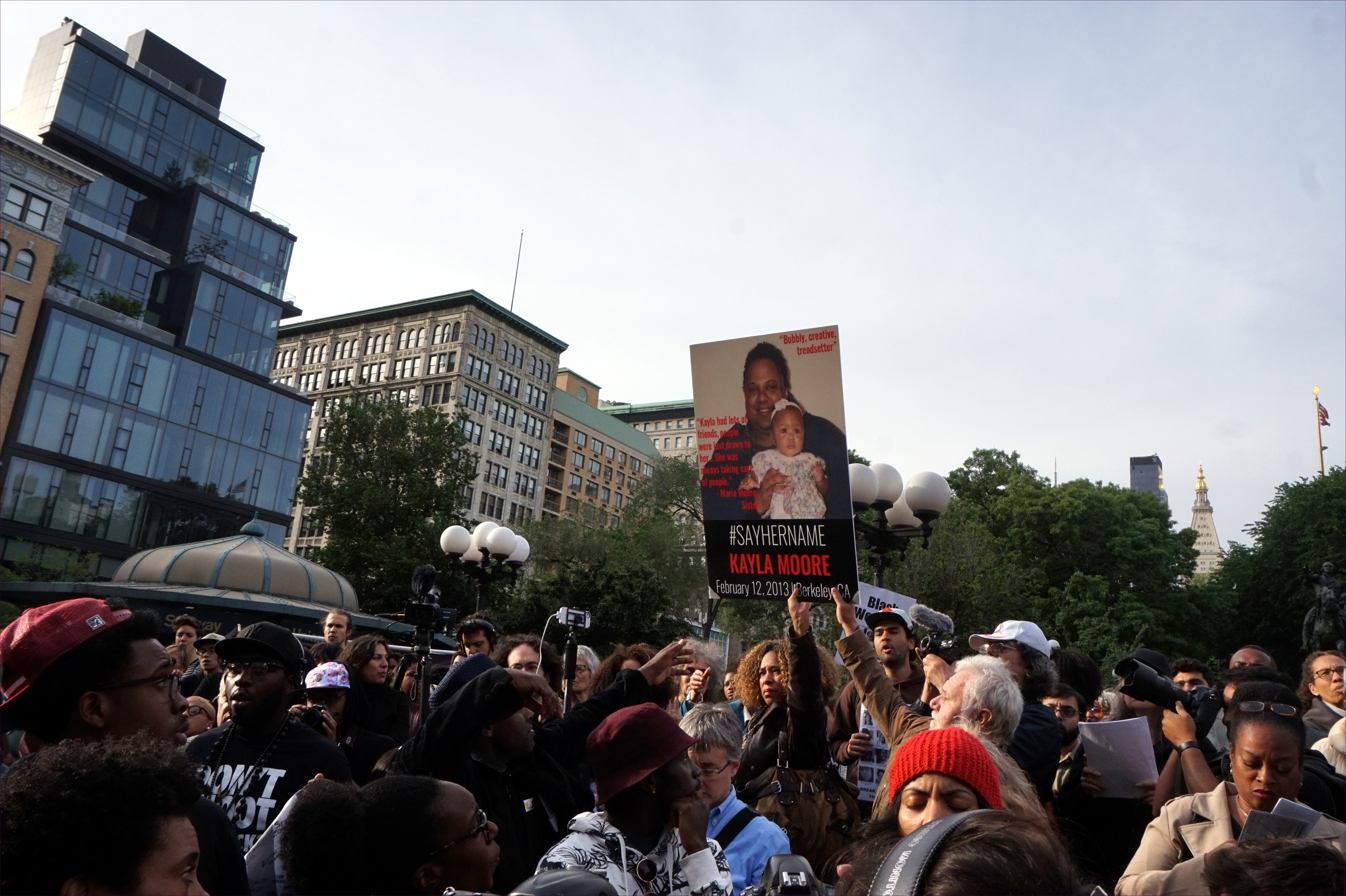
Attendees at the #SayHerName vigil of May 20, 2015, located at Union Square in New York City

#SayHerName is a social movement that seeks to raise awareness for Black women victims of police brutality and anti-Black violence in the United States. The movement's name was created by the African American Policy Forum (AAPF). #SayHerName aims to highlight the gender-specific ways in which Black women are disproportionately affected by fatal acts of racial injustice. In an effort to create a large social media presence alongside existing racial justice campaigns, such as #BlackLivesMatter and #BlackGirlsMatter, the AAPF coined the hashtag #SayHerName in December 2014.

In May 2015, the AAPF released a report entitled "Say Her Name: Resisting Police Brutality against Black Women", which outlined the goals and objectives of the #SayHerName movement. In July 2015, Sandra Bland, a woman who had been taken into police custody after a traffic violation, was found hanged three days later in her jail cell. Following Bland's death, the AAPF, the Center for Intersectionality and Social Policy Studies at Columbia Law School, and Andrea Ritchie issued an updated version of the original report.

Drawing from the AAPF report, the #SayHerName movement strives to address the marginalization of Black women within both mainstream media and the #BlackLivesMatter movement. Of the movement's many agendas, one includes commemorating the women who have died due to police brutality and anti-Black violence.

== Origins of the movement ==
=== Name of movement ===
#SayHerName stems from the idea that having individuals and the media say the names of Black women who have been victims of police violence will make people ask necessary questions about the causes and circumstances of that violence. And the concept of saying the name is also a symbol or shorthand for learning and telling the stories of these women, again both between individuals and in the media. Crenshaw has said, "If you say the name, you're prompted to learn the story, and if you know the story, then you have a broader sense of all the ways Black bodies are made vulnerable to police violence."

=== Creation of the campaign ===
The #SayHerName movement is a response to the Black Lives Matter movement and the mainstream media's tendency to sideline the experiences of Black women in the context of police brutality and anti-Black violence. The campaign for this movement began in December 2014 by the African American Policy Forum (AAPF) and the Center for Intersectionality and Social Policy Studies (CISPS). The reasoning behind the campaign is to bring awareness to the most often invisible names and stories of Black women and girls who have been victimized by racist police. Statistics have shown that Black women and girls as young as 7 and old as 93 have been victims of police brutality. In recent years, the killings of unarmed Black youth like Trayvon Martin and men like Michael Brown have captured much more national attention and public outrage than the killings of Black women such as Rekia Boyd and Shelly Frey. According to Kimberlé Crenshaw, one of the founders of the AAPF, Black women's continued exclusion from stories about police brutality, racism, and anti-Black violence contribute to an erroneous notion that Black men are the chief victims of racism and state-sanctioned violence which underplay issues such as rape and sexual assault by police. #SayHerName does not seek to replace Black Lives Matter or dilute its power but aims to simply add perspectives and lived experiences to the conversation of racial injustice. Over the past five years, the #SayHerName campaigned has expanded and overall increased its focus on direct advocacy. The movement actively considers how multiple social identities (including gender, sexual orientation, and class) influence an individual's experiences with police brutality and anti-Black violence, a concept known as intersectionality.

=== Intersectionality ===
#SayHerName builds on texts and movements like Anannya Bhatacharjee's 2001 report Whose Safety? Women and the Violence of Law Enforcement in order to expand on systemic violence in a way that is committed to being intersectional. Works that have been published as results of intersectional approaches to victimization through violence include Beth Richie's Arrested Justice: Black Women, Violence, and America's Prison Nation (2012) as well as a list from INCITE! Including The Color of Violence: The INCITE! Anthology, Law Enforcement Violence Against Women of Color and Trans People of Color: A Critical Intersection of Gender and State Violence, and Queer (In)Justice: The Criminalization of LGBT People in the United States.

#SayHerName as a movement is largely based on the concept of intersectionality in order to bring attention to all victims of systemic violence. Intersectionality is a term that Kimberlé Crenshaw, a well-regarded scholar and activist, was responsible for coining in 1989. Since then, it has become a key element of many modern feminist practices. Brittany Cooper explains how intersectionality provides an analytical frame originally designed to address the unique positions of women of color within rights movements. Its relevance to #SayHerName is highlighted by Crenshaw's founding position in both the concept of intersectionality and the movement itself. The focus on the victimization of Black women within the #SayHerName movement is dependent on the notion of intersectionality, which Crenshaw describes as "like a lazy Susan – you can subject race, sexuality, transgender identity or class to a feminist critique through intersectionality".

Additional factors in an intersectional analysis within #SayHerName include cis or trans status, education, geographical location, and disability – both on the parts of the victims being targeted and the officers responsible for the violence. Crenshaw especially highlights the role of both physical and mental disability as a factor that puts victims more at risk of being targeted as threatening or otherwise violent by police. This is exacerbated by stereotypes of aggressiveness and poor emotional control attributed to Black women and men in the United States.

Homa Kahleeli asserts that over seventy Black women have died as a result of either police violence or police misconduct within the past three years. In instances of police misconduct where firearms are discharged, both female and child victims have been described as "collateral damage", which advocates say erases responsibility of the officer.

=== Canadian impact ===
The #SayHerName campaign started in the United States to draw attention to police brutality against Black women, but its intersectional theme has caught on all around the world. Its principles have been modified by activists in Canada to combat gendered racial violence against racialized and Indigenous women. Community-led gatherings use #SayHerName to talk about police brutality, anti-Blackness, and the underrepresentation of women of color in Canadian discussions.

This relationship is demonstrated by two Canadian cases:

- Regis Korchinski-Paquet, an Afro-Indigenous woman, died during a police mental health call in Toronto in May 2020, sparking national outcry
- D’Andre Campbell, a Black man with mental health issues, was fatally shot by police in Brampton in April 2020 after calling 911 for help

These incidents show how the intersectional perspective of #SayHerName extends to racialized and immigrant communities in Canada, calling for more justice and accountability.

== Social media ==
The #SayHerName movement is one of many contemporary social justice campaigns that engage in hashtag activism and digital activism. Created by AAPF and CISPS in December 2014, the #SayHerName hashtag provides an online community for activists, scholars, news reporters, and other social media users to participate in the conversation on racial justice along with other social movements such as Black Lives Matter.

The hashtag is mostly active on Twitter. Of its many uses, the #SayHerName hashtag has principally served to highlight recent incidents of Black women's fatal encounters with police and anti-Black violence as well as advertise upcoming events. An analysis of Twitter activity found that a third of Tweets using the hashtag were in conjunction with the name of a Black woman who was a victim of police violence. Other content using the hashtag included links to blogs written by Black women, such as The Huffington Post's Black Voices column, Blavity, and BlackGirlTragic.com. Second most frequent were academics, particularly Black feminist scholars, though the largest number of retweets came from a white male entertainer.

The #SayHerName hashtag strives to advance one of the chief goals of the movement: to re-integrate Black women's lived experiences into mainstream narratives about police brutality and state-sanctioned violence. Through its engagement with hashtag activism, #SayHerName is an example of a social historical development in which the media's tendency to disregard or misrepresent events pertaining to racial justice incites digital activism. In addition, #SayHerName contributes to an expanding discourse on Black women's susceptibility to police brutality and anti-Black violence.

=== Supporters ===
Some of the strongest original supporters of the #SayHerName movement include people who were directly impacted by the killings. Friends, family members, and individuals who shared similar social identities with the victims were and remain likely to participate in mobilization efforts. Mothers especially appear to have a strong emotional connection to the cause and are willing to speak out against police brutality and anti-Black violence.

The movement has received support from several celebrities, which is integral to the spread of the movement and its social media reach. Through the use of the #SayHerName hashtag, influential figures can increase public awareness and shed light on instances of racial injustice, which can sometimes go unnoticed. Such high-profile support was seen immediately following the death of Sandra Bland; musical artist Janelle Monáe tweeted the #SayHerName hashtag, as did actress Taraji P. Henson. Nicki Minaj, Jessie J, and Zendaya Coleman all recognized Bland's death on Instagram. For example, to refer to Nicki Minaj's tweet on twitter, she stated: "If you haven't looked into this story yet, please do. It's the most disturbing thing going on right now. #SandraBland." Later within the same day, Nicki posted a disturbing video that included footage from the police officers' dash camera during the arrest that consisted of Sandra Bland repeatedly begging the officer to stop hurting her. The video was captioned with "Rest in Peace #SandraBland" and gained over millions of views.

The American Civil Liberties Union has supported the movement, using the hashtag to promote activism particularly regarding violence against transgender women of color. The Human Rights Campaign likewise uses the hashtag in this manner. The 2017 Women's March also used the hashtag on Twitter, recognizing transgender women of color killed in 2017.

== Activities ==
Since the movement began in late 2014, there have been two nationwide events (one that occurred in May of that year and another one twelve months later) to increase public awareness. The second #SayHerName Silent Protest: National Day of Action to End State Violence Against Women and Girls took place in major cities around the country and garnered significant attention on social media. In New York, Chicago, Los Angeles, and elsewhere, men and women took to the streets with duct tape over their mouths to represent the silence and erasure of Black women and girls' narratives along with signs in their hands to remember those that have lost their lives to police brutality and anti-Black violence.

Another event that occurred recently since the movement began is the annual Mothers Weekend in NYC. This took place years following 2015 and had the purpose of shining spotlight on mothers who have lost their daughters to police brutality. Weekends are reserved for educational purposes so individuals can learn about the specific needs of family members of black women and girls who are victims of racist state violence and provide a safe environment/comfort zone. This resulted in a community being formulated that supported fighting for the #SayHerName movement while also creating a network for activism. The overall goal of these events is to get everyone to speak up more on this issue but mainly those who are victims of police and gender violence crimes.

At Ohio University, the Women's Center created a #SayHerName program for both Fall 2020 and Spring 2021. The Spring 2021 program involved speakers and structured discussion topics. They begin every session with a moment of silence for the women who had lost their lives.

The AAPF memorializes these women on their "Angel Day", the day they were killed.

In 2020, there was a resurgence in the #SayHerName campaign. This was due to the growing popularity of the Black Lives Matter movement and the murder of Breonna Taylor. Taylor was a Black woman killed in March 2020 by police officers in civilian clothing, during a rushed police raid. A year after her death, Kentucky Governor, Andy Beshear, signed a bill into law that would limit no-knock warrants. The city of Louisville responded to this and officially banned no-knock warrants in Spring 2021 and named it "Breonna's Law."

The WNBA dedicated their 2020 season to "long history of inequality, implicit bias and racism that disproportionately impacts communities of color" by partnering with the #SayHerName campaign. The first weekend of their season, the players wore jerseys honoring Breonna Taylor and the #SayHerName movement. Angel McCoughtry, a player for Louisville, created the idea to put Breonna Taylor on the back of the women's jerseys. McCoughtry has brought greater light to this by saying, "It's a lot deeper than just the jersey, but I think that's a great start."

In 2021, Janelle Monáe released "Hell You Talmbout" alongside Kimberlé Crenshaw and the AAPF.

Advocates claim that the #SayHerName hashtag has successfully created a safe online place for marginalized groups to come together and mourn their losses. However, as the hashtag spreads from Twitter to Facebook along with other social media platforms, the rhetoric does not change. Despite the diversity in background, with each woman sharing her story, the same underlying themes of vulnerability to physical police and aggressive sexual violence keep reappearing, making it appear that simply saying the names, remembering the faces and increasing awareness is not enough. Experts say that despite being only 7% of the population, and outnumbered by white women at the ratio of 5:1, Black women and girls have accounted for 20% of the unarmed people killed by police since 1999.

== Relationship with #BlackLivesMatter ==
Although the movement makes an active effort to engage in discourse and conversation with the Black Lives Matter movement, #SayHerName is different in its construct, goals and methods. Feminist theorists such as Kimberlé Crenshaw have pointed out that the #SayHerName movement addresses intersectionality of gender, class and disability that play out on Black women and girls' bodies. These are aspects that do not appear to be so readily addressed by the Black Lives Matter movement, which is specifically known as a movement that addresses racial inequality within the criminal justice system. Many supporters of the Black Lives Matter movement were largely sparked by outrage of the deaths of young African-American males at the hands of police with excessive violence and no repercussion from the legal system. In contrast, when stories of African-American women meeting similar fates in just as harrowing circumstances were brought up, the number of supporters and advocates seemed to decrease; female victim's names and stories are generally less recognized than the male victims. #SayHerName aims to raise awareness of how sexism and racism simultaneously play out of colored female bodies, no matter their background, while still being a safe, inclusive space for all individuals to come together and create and participate in discourse.

== Role of the African American Policy Forum ==
The #SayHerName movement represents one of three recent racial justice initiatives engendered by the AAPF. Since coining the #SayHerName hashtag in February 2015, the AAPF has assumed a central role in mobilizing the campaign – an effort that has culminated into at least two significant events: the AAPF's release of the report "Say Her Name: Resisting Police Brutality against Black Women" and its sponsoring of "#SayHerName: A Vigil in Remembrance of Black Women and Girls Killed by the Police". Both events occurred in May 2015 and have served to disrupt mainstream racial justice narratives that attend exclusively to heterosexual, cisgender Black men's susceptibility to police brutality and anti-Black violence. Since 2015, #SayHerName has organized Mother's Weekends in New York. These weekends shed light on the necessities of the families of those who lost Black women to a racist state. They also provide a place of inclusion and community for those individuals also. The #SayHerName Mothers Network has assembled numerous times. The Mothers Network marched in the Women's March in Washington, organized meetings and focus groups to come up with the most effective ways to aid families who have lost women to police violence, and they also lobbied for police reform.

=== May 2015 report ===
In May 2015, the AAPF, in conjunction with the Center for Intersectionality and Social Policy Studies at Columbia Law School and Soros Justice Fellow, Andrea Ritchie, issued a report entitled "Say Her Name: Resisting Police Brutality against Black Women". The report highlights the goals and objectives of the #SayHerName movement and presents several reasons as to why gender-inclusivity is a critical component of racial justice advocacy. In addition to these, the report includes several accounts detailing incidents from the last three decades of Black women's fatal encounters with police brutality and state-sanctioned violence. To supplement these accounts, the report incorporates an intersectional framework for understanding Black women's susceptibility to police brutality by addressing how the interactions between race, gender, sexual orientation, class, and ability inform the violent ways in which law enforcement officials treat Black women.

After divulging recent incidents of police brutality against Black women, the report concludes with several recommendations as to how members of local communities, policy-makers, researchers, and activists can best incorporate a gender-inclusive framework into racial justice campaigns that specifically address police brutality and state-sanctioned violence. By contributing these recommendations, the AAPF, along with the Center for Intersectionality and Social Policy Studies at Columbia Law School and Andrea Ritchie, hopes that the report could serve as a useful resource to which the media, community organizers, policy-makers, and other stakeholders invested in racial justice can refer.

After Sandra Bland's encounter with police in July 2015, the AAPF released an updated version of the original report. While the structure of the updated version is similar to that of the original report, the updated version contributes additional accounts of Black women's deadly encounters with police and includes a description of the circumstances surrounding Bland's death. By issuing the updated version, the AAPF strives to reinforce the critical, urgent need for policy-makers, the media, community organizers, and other stakeholders to tackle the structural inequalities that render Black women within the United States heavily susceptible to police-instigated, anti-Black violence. The report also failed to reference the 2006 FBI bulletin warning that white supremacists had infiltrated police departments nationwide.

Names mentioned in the updated version of the #SayHerName report, and on the AAPF "In Memoriam"

- Priscilla Slater – Died in police custody on June 10, 2020
- Breonna Taylor – Killed by police on March 13, 2020
- Atatiana Jefferson – Killed by police on October 12, 2019
- Crystal Ragland – Killed by police on May 30, 2019
- Pamela Turner – Killed by police on May 13, 2019
- Nina Adams – Killed by police on March 13, 2019
- Latasha Walton – Killed by police on March 12, 2019
- Brittany McLean – Died in police custody on March 9, 2019
- Angel Decarlo – Killed by police on December 18, 2018
- April Webster – Killed by police in her home on December 16, 2018
- Tameka Simpson – Killed by police on December 11, 2018
- LaJuana Philips – Killed by police on October 2, 2018
- Dereshia Blackwell – Killed by police on September 9, 2018
- Cynthia Fields – Killed by a stray bullet by police on July 27, 2018
- LaShanda Anderson – Killed by police on June 9, 2018
- Shukri Ali Said – Killed by police on April 28, 2018
- DeCynthia Clements – Killed by police on March 12, 2018
- Crystalline Barnes – Killed by police during a traffic stop on January 27, 2018
- Geraldine Townsend – Killed by police on January 17, 2018
- Sandy Guardiola – Killed in her bed by police on October 4, 2017
- India N. Nelson – Killed by police on July 17, 2017
- Charleena Chavon Lyles – Killed by police on June 18, 2017
- Jonie Block – Killed by police on May 15, 2017
- Alteria Woods – Killed by police while pregnant on March 19, 2017
- Morgan London Rankins – Killed by police on February 22, 2017
- Deborah Danner – Killed in her home by police on October 18, 2016
- Korryn Gaines – Killed by police on August 1, 2016
- Jessica Williams – Killed by police on May 19, 2016
- Deresha Armstrong – Killed by police on May 5, 2016
- Laronda Sweatt – Killed by police on April 6, 2016
- India M. Beaty – Killed by police on March 19, 2016
- Kisha Michael – Killed by police on February 21, 2016
- Sahlah Ridgeway – Killed by police on February 12, 2016
- Gynna McMillen – Died in police custody on January 10, 2016
- Bettie Jones – Killed by police on December 26, 2015
- Barbara Dawson – Died December 21, 2015
- Marquesha McMillan – Killed by police on October 26, 2015
- India Kager – Killed by police in her car on September 5, 2015
- Redel Jones – Killed by police August 12, 2015
- Raynette Turner – Died in police custody on July 27, 2015
- Ralkina Jones – Died in police custody on July 26, 2015
- Joyce Curnell – Died in police custody on July 22, 2015
- Kindra Chapman – Died in police custody on July 14, 2015
- Sandra Bland – Died in police custody on July 13, 2015
- Nuwnah Laroche – Killed by police on May 7, 2015
- Alexia Christian – Killed by police on April 30, 2015
- Mya Hall – Killed by police on March 30, 2015
- Meagan Hockaday – Killed by police on March 28, 2015
- Janisha Fonville – Killed by police on February 18, 2015
- Natasha McKenna – Died of police-induced trauma on February 8, 2015
- Tanisha Anderson – Killed by police on November 13, 2014
- Aura Rosser – Killed by police on November 9, 2014
- Sheneque Proctor – Died in police custody after being refused medical treatment on November 1, 2014
- Iretha Lilly – Died in police custody on October 6, 2014
- Latandra Ellington – Killed in her jail cell on October 1, 2014, 10 days after writing to her family that she was threatened by an officer
- Michelle Cusseaux – Killed by police on August 13, 2014
- Pearlie Golden – Killed by police on May 7, 2014
- Gabriella Nevarez – Killed by police on March 2, 2014
- Yvette Smith – Killed by police on February 16, 2014
- Tracy A. Wade – Killed by police in 2014
- Ariel Levy – Killed by police in 2014
- Angela Beatrice Randolph – Killed by police in 2014
- Dawn Cameron – Killed by police in 2014
- Shonda Mikelson – Killed by police in 2014
- Renisha McBride – Killed on November 3, 2013
- Miriam Carey – Killed by federal agents on October 3, 2013
- Kyam Livingston – Died in police custody on July 24, 2013
- Kayla Moore – Killed by police on February 12, 2013
- Angelique Styles – Killed by police in 2013
- Shelly Frey – Killed by police on December 6, 2012
- Malissa Williams – Killed by police on November 29, 2012
- Erica Collins – Killed by police on October 13, 2012
- Shulena Weldon – Died after being run over by a car by police on August 9, 2012
- Alesia Thomas – Killed by police on July 22, 2012
- Shantel Davis – Killed by police on June 14, 2012
- Sharmel Edwards – Killed by police on April 21, 2012
- Rekia Boyd – Killed by police on March 21, 2012
- Shereese Francis – Killed by police on March 15, 2012
- Jameela Barnette – Killed by police on December 25, 2011
- Unnamed – Killed October 3, 2011
- Catawaba Howard – Killed by police on August 12, 2011
- Brenda Williams – Killed by police on April 27, 2011
- Derrinesha Clay – Killed by police on March 14, 2011
- Shelley Amos and Cheryl Blount-Burton – Killed on February 19, 2011, by an on-duty police officer who was driving twice the speed limit and was not responding to an emergency call
- Carolyn Moran-Hernandez – Killed by police on February 14, 2011
- Latricka Sloan – Killed by police on January 22, 2011
- Aiyana Stanley-Jones – Killed by police on May 16, 2010
- Ahjah Dixon – Died in police custody on March 4, 2010
- Sarah Riggins – Killed by police on October 23, 2009
- Katherine Hysaw – Killed by police on September 9, 2009
- Barbara Stewart – Killed by police on March 24, 2009
- Duanna Johnson – Died in 2008
- Tarika Wilson – Killed by police on January 4, 2008
- Kathryn Johnston – Killed by police on November 21, 2006
- Alberta Spruill – Died of police-induced trauma on May 16, 2003
- Kendra James – Killed by police on May 5, 2003
- Nizah Morris – Died in 2002
- LaTanya Haggerty – Killed by police on June 4, 1999
- Margaret LaVerne Mitchell – Killed by police on May 21, 1999
- Tyisha Miller – Killed by police on December 28, 1998
- Danette Daniels – Killed by police on June 8, 1997
- Frankie Ann Perkins – Killed by police on March 22, 1997
- Sonji Taylor – Killed by police on December 16, 1993
- Eleanor Bumpurs – Killed by police on October 29, 1984

== Mothers Network ==
In November 2016, the #SayHerName Mothers Network was made official. This took place a year and half after the first #SayHerName vigil was held in Union Square in New York City. The mother's network was reconvened on many occasions since the original official meeting. These times include women's march in Washington, lobbying for police reform on Capitol Hill, and several focus groups for strategizing purposes. These mothers also meet together to go over needs of new members who have been directly affected by police violence with their daughters. These mothers also organize vigils for victims of police violence including Charleena Lyles and Vicky Coles-McAdory, who was an original member who died from a stroke in 2017.

=== Recommendations ===
The AAPF published a "Take Action Guide" that lists five action items. Intended for immediate implementation, they include: "find ways to support all families who have lost loved ones to police violence, create spaces to discuss how the intersections of patriarchy, homophobia, and transphobia impact Black communities as a whole, and continuously develop skills to talk about the multiplicity of ways in which state violence affects all Black women and girls, particularly those who are transgender, non-transgender and gender-nonconforming".

=== Events ===
The AAPF hosts events promoting the #SayHerName movement on a semi-regular basis. One example was an event in March 2017 titled "Say Her Name: An Evening of Arts and Action Los Angeles".

There was also a protest that was held in remembrance of Sandra Bland and all other Black lives that have been lost. Sandra Bland's mother along with Janelle Monáe lead a BlackLivesMatter protest in Chicago shortly after Bland's death. There were roughly 200 protestors present at this protest, all demanding justice for the unfair actions that were being done towards blacks. Monáe also wanted justice so this caused her to bring her activism to Chicago. In her words: "I come here as a black woman. We come as a black man, black human beings. We are particularly drawn to all of the stories in this movement, and we have recorded a tool for you to use, those who are out here on the front lines. This is the least we can do." With this statement, Monae was referring to her song "Hell You Talmbout". In social movements and protests, songs tend to be used as an outlet as well as a speaking voice so individuals can be heard. "Hell You Talmbout" has been used as a battle cry for protestors worldwide throughout protests. The background reasoning behind the song is to deal with the negligence, recurring disrespect, and abuse of power from some police officers.

=== Spread of the movement ===
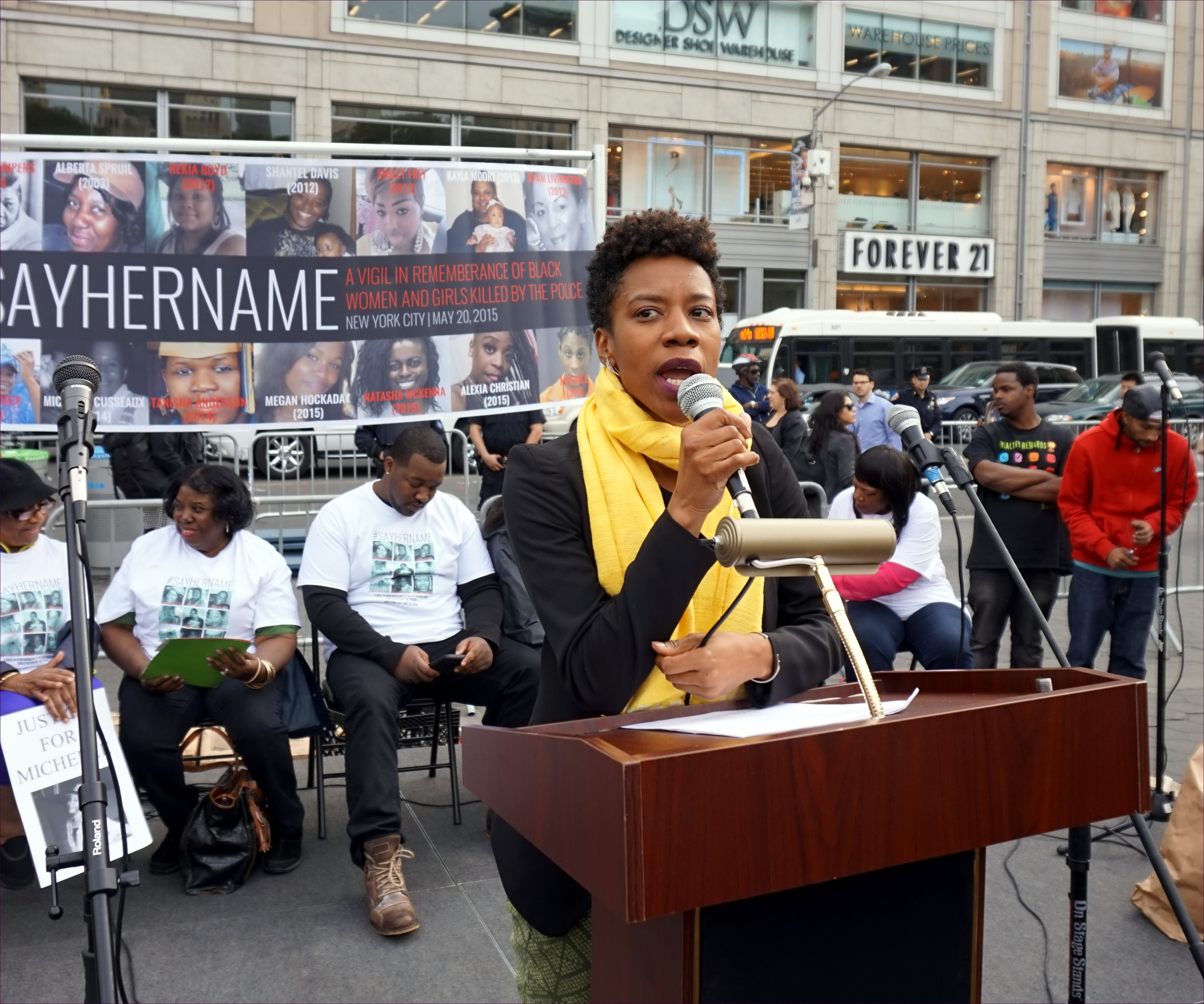
Social justice activist, writer, and artist Piper Anderson speaking at "#SayHerName: A Vigil in Remembrance of Black Women and Girls Killed by the Police"

On May 20, 2015, the AAPF and twenty local sponsors, including the Black Youth Project 100 and the Center for Intersectionality and Social Policy Studies at Columbia Law School, organized an event called "#SayHerName: A Vigil in Remembrance of Black Women and Girls Killed by the Police". The purpose of the vigil, which transpired at Union Square in New York City, was to commemorate such women as Rekia Boyd, Tanisha Anderson, Miriam Carey, and Kayla Moore, among many others, who lost their lives due to police brutality and anti-Black violence. Relatives of Tanisha Anderson, Rekia Boyd, Shantel Davis, Shelly Fray, Alberta Spruill, Kyam Livingston, Kayla Moore, Miriam Carey, and Michelle Cusseaux attended, marking the first time that the family members gathered at the same location for the purpose of honoring the women.

In addition to commemorating the lives of such women, the event featured speeches, singing, poetry, and art by scholars, artists, and activists, including Kimberlé Crenshaw, Piper Anderson, Eve Ensler, LaChanze, and Aja Monet. Aja Monet wrote a poem advocating for the #SayHerName movement.

Given how the vigil occurred one day prior to the National Day of Action on Black Women and Girls, one of its principal aims was to mobilize the New York City community into action against gendered and racialized forms of violence and police brutality. By demanding that the public no longer ignore Black women's struggles against gendered, racialized violence, the vigil's attendants strove to advance one of the chief goals of the #SayHerName movement: to re-integrate Black women leaders and victims of anti-Black violence into mainstream racial justice narratives about racism and police brutality.

On the other side of the country in May 2015, Black women and girls also stood in the middle of San Francisco, holding signs and displaying painted messages on their bare chests. Some phrases included "I fight for those who have been murdered by the state", "with love for female masculinity", and "to end infant mortality".

== Murder of Brianna Ghey ==
On February 11, 2023, 16-year old British trans girl Brianna Ghey was killed. Two teenagers were charged with her murder. Many activists claim that this attack was an anti-trans hate crime; police are still investigating the matter.

Major news sites faced backlash for using her deadname in their articles. This launched an online movement where the hashtag #SayHerName was used to advocate for her chosen name to be used. Though many of the major news sites edited their articles to use the name "Brianna Ghey", the online movement faced some criticism for its repurposing of the hashtag.

== Murder of Laken Riley ==
During the 2024 State of the Union Address, Marjorie Taylor Greene interrupted Joe Biden by demanding he mention Laken Riley, a university student who was murdered on February 22 while jogging outside of the University of Georgia by an illegal immigrant from Venezuela. Greene had been wearing a pin and shirt that featured both Laken Riley and the phrase "Say Her Name". There was criticism towards Greene for using the phrase to reference her murder from Kimberlé Crenshaw of the African American Policy Forum, who had coined the phrase in 2015, and Tamika Mallory, with both stating that while Laken Riley deserves justice, Greene is appropriating the phrase whose original purpose she had previously demonized.

== Killing of Renée Good ==
On January 7, 2026, Renée Good was shot and killed by an ICE agent. The killing lead to massive protests and outrage across the country. People on social media used #sayhername, as well as protesters and vigils used “Say Her Name”. The co-founder of BLM chanted it with a crowd of people wanting ICE to have accountability for her death.

There has been criticism with using the saying as Jonathan Turley calls it “Democrats Rallying Call” as well as it being called “Toned Deaf” by others as another example of how society elevates white women over Black women, and how it was originally used for at the time unknown Sandra Bland which brought attention to the case, but has been used for multiple white women like Heather Heyer, Justine Damond, and Ashli Babbitt.

== See also ==
- Gendered racism
- Say Their Names – 2020 mural in Kansas, United States
