= African American Policy Forum =

Social justice think tank focused on issues of gender and diversity

The African American Policy Forum (AAPF) is a social justice think tank focused on issues of gender and diversity. AAPF seeks to build bridges between arts, activism, and the academy in order to address structural inequality and systemic oppression. AAPF develops and promotes frameworks and strategies that address a vision of racial justice that embraces the intersections of race, gender, class, and the array of barriers that disempower those who are marginalized in society.

Seeking to raise awareness for Black female victims of police brutality and anti-Black violence in the United States, AAPF released a report entitled "Say Her Name: Resisting Police Brutality against Black Women" in July 2015. The report documents stories of Black women who have been killed by police, shining a spotlight on forms of police brutality often experienced disproportionately by women of color. It also provides analytical frameworks for understanding Black women's experiences, and broadens dominant conceptions of who experiences state violence and what it looks like. In February 2015, the AAPF coined the hashtag #SayHerName in an effort to create a large social media presence alongside existing racial justice campaigns, such as #BlackLivesMatter and #BlackGirlsMatter. Since 2015, #SayHerName has seen global use to call attention to the continued lack of Black women's narratives in discussions of state violence.

== History and mission ==
The African American Policy Forum (AAPF) was co-founded in 1996 by Kimberlé Crenshaw, Professor of Law at UCLA and Columbia Law School and leading authority in the area of Civil Rights and Black feminist legal theory; and Luke Charles Harris, Professor of Political Science at Vassar College and leading authority in the field of critical race theory. The Policy Forum was developed as part of an ongoing effort to promote women's rights in the context of struggles for racial justice.

The African American Policy Forum's mission is to utilize new ideas and innovative perspectives to transform public discourse and policy. The Policy Forum promotes frameworks and strategies that address a vision of racial justice that embraces the intersections of race, gender, class, and the array of barriers that disempower those who are marginalized in society. Bridging art, activism, and academic discourse in their work, AAPF is dedicated to advancing and expanding racial justice, gender equality, and the indivisibility of all human rights, both in the U.S. and internationally.

== Initiatives and campaigns ==
=== #WhyWeCantWait ===
#WhyWeCantWait was publicly announced on June 17, 2014 with the issuing of an open letter sent to former President Barack Obama, signed by over 1,400 women of color entitled "Why We Can't Wait: Women of Color Urge Inclusion in 'My Brother's Keeper.'" In this letter, women of color questioned how attempts to address the challenges facing men of color – without integrating a comparable focus on the complex lives of girls and women who live and struggle together in the same families, homes, schools, and neighborhoods – advances the interests of the community as a whole. The women who signed this letter shared a commitment to the expansion of "My Brother's Keeper" (MBK) and all other national youth interventions to include an explicit focus on the structural conditions that negatively impact all youth of color.

In addition to the Why We Can't Wait letter, AAPF also published an open letter on May 30, 2014, signed by "250+ Concerned Black Men and Other Men of Color". This letter called for the inclusion of women and girls of color in the president's initiative. Signers included writer and activist Darnell Moore, actor Danny Glover, professor Robin D.G. Kelly, and writer and professor Kiese Laymon.

Later, on July 10, 2014, AAPF organized a conversation moderated by GRITtv's Laura Flanders on the necessity of expanding "My Brother's Keeper". Featured speakers included AAPF co-founder Kimberlé Crenshaw, Professor and Co-Founder of The Crunk Feminist Collective Brittney Cooper, Founder and Executive Director of Girls for Gender Equity Joanne Smith, as well as Professors Kristie Dotson and Rosa Linda Fregoso.

=== #BreakingTheSilence ===
#BreakingTheSilence refers to a national town hall series launched by the AAPF in 2014. This series, entitled "Breaking the Silence: A National Town Hall Series on Women & Girls of Color", focuses on elevating the stories and experiences of women and girls of color in order to bring the circumstances facing many women of color into public policy debates, while helping community leaders develop and advance local agendas for gender-inclusive racial justice. Beginning in 2014, AAPF has partnered with local organizations to hold town hall events in New York, Los Angeles, Atlanta, Chicago, Washington DC, Baltimore, Miami, New Orleans, Philadelphia, Oakland and Greensboro.

Following the momentum of the Breaking the Silence Townhall, AAPF established the Breaking the Silence summer camp series during the summer of 2015. Breaking Silence: An Arts, Action, and Healing Summer Camp is an AAPF program that convenes an intergenerational group of women and girls of color from across the country into a space to share stories, uplift spirits, and fight for justice using artistic modes of expression.

=== #BlackGirlsMatter ===
#BlackGirlsMatter is a social media campaign that intends to catalogue the experiences of black girls in the United States. This campaign was initiated when African American Policy Forum and the Center for Intersectionality and Social Policy Studies at Columbia Law School released a report titled "Black Girls Matter: Pushed Out, Overpoliced, and Underprotected", on February 4, 2015. The report, based on an analysis of Department of Education discipline data for New York City and Boston Public Schools as well as personal interviews with young women from these areas, focused on the specific challenges that girls of color face in schools.

The Black Girls Matter report cites several examples of excessive disciplinary actions against young black girls, including the controversial 2014 case of a 12-year-old in Georgia who faced expulsion and criminal charges for writing the word "hi" on a locker room wall. A white female classmate who was also involved faced a much less severe punishment. According to the most recent data from the U.S. Department of Education cited in the report, nationally, Black girls were suspended six times more than white girls, while Black boys were suspended three times as often as white boys. Data specific to New York and Boston demonstrates that the relative risk for disciplinary action is higher for Black girls when compared to white girls than it is for Black boys when compared to white boys.

The report recommends policies and interventions to address challenges facing girls of color, including revising policies that funnel girls into juvenile supervision facilities; developing programs that identify signs of sexual victimization and assist girls in addressing traumatic experiences; advancing programs that support girls who are pregnant, parenting, or otherwise assuming significant familial responsibilities; and improving data collection to better track discipline and achievement by race/ethnicity and gender for all groups.

=== #SayHerName ===
The #SayHerName hashtag—coined by AAPF in February 2015—has come to represent the burgeoning movement to uplift the stories of Black women facing a myriad of systemic issues, including domestic violence, sexual assault by police, and inadequate mental health support. On May 20, 2015, AAPF hosted #SayHerName: A Vigil in Memory of Black Women and Girls Killed by the Police at Union Square in New York City. Family members of Black women killed by police came together from across the country for the first time in a vigil to uplift their loved ones' stories. Later on in May 2015, AAPF released a report entitled "Say Her Name: Resisting Police Brutality Against Black Women", which outlined the goals and objectives of the #SayHerName movement. The report provides an analytical framework for understanding black women's susceptibility to police brutality and state-sanctioned violence, and also offers some suggestions on how to effectively mobilize various communities and empower them to advocate for racial justice.

AAPF has sponsored a variety of events ranging from art showcases to activist actions in relation to #SayHerName. On November 1, 2015, AAPF, One Billion Rising, and Thandie Newton co-hosted a #SayHerName event in Los Angeles, calling on artists and activists in the entertainment industry to #SayHerName. The next year, on November 12, 2016, AAPF held #SayHerName: An Evening of Art and Action at the Nuyorican poet's cafe in New York City. On February 24, 2017, AAPF held another evening of art and action at the Pratt Institute in conjunction with their BlackLivesMatter Teach-In program.

=== #HerDreamDeferred ===
In late March to early April 2015, AAPF launched a week-long online series dedicated to elevating the status of Black women entitled #HerDreamDeferred. AAPF co-organized this initiative with the Lawyer's Committee for Civil Rights Under Law, the National Organization for Women, Institute for Women's Policy Research, Black Women's Blueprint, PACE and other racial and gender justice leaders in honor of Women's History Month and the UN Declaration of 2015 as the start of the International Decade for People of African Descent.

Each day during the week of March 30 to April 3, 2015, AAPF hosted an online event to highlight a specific set of challenges facing Black women. Topics that were covered included: state-sanctioned violence, economic inequality, sexual assault and domestic violence, school-pushout, health disparities, and the challenges faced by Black women in higher education. The goal of the series was to elevate these challenges so that stakeholders across the country could better understand and address the challenges facing Black women and girls.

In 2016, AAPF reconvened the online event series. During the week of March 28 to April 1, AAPF covered topics relating to criminalization of Black girls in and out of school, the war on Black single mothers, the status of women of color in the South, sexual assault at HBCUs, and challenges faced by Black women veterans. In 2017, the series was expanded to include events at the Hammer Museum in Los Angeles on March 28, 29, and 30th, as well as events at Impact Hub LA in addition to the virtual workshops. Topics included the resistance of Afro-Colombian women at the intersection of racism, sexism, and war, a #SayHerName night of performance curated by Abby Dobson, Latasha Harlins and the victimization of Black girls (moderated by Laura Flanders), representations of Black women in the media (and Hollywood in particular), and Black women and tech activism.

Beginning in 2015 as a result of the Her Dream Deferred initiative, Senator Kirsten Gillibrand (D-NY) has entered into the Congressional Record her request that the last week of March be Black Women's History Week, as part of Women's History Month. Coinciding with the annual Her Dream Deferred series, this week would focus on the status of Black women and girls, acknowledging their contributions to the nation as well as addressing the challenges they continue to face.

=== Researcher's collaborative ===
In May 2015, AAPF, in collaboration with the Center for Intersectionality and Social Policy Studies at Columbia Law School, convened an interdisciplinary group of researchers, service providers and advocates whose work focuses on the intersectional issues impacting women of color.

Among the issues surfaced during the convening were the disciplinary and institutional barriers that suppress information sharing among experts; the marginalization of research about women of color within academic and research institutions; the lack of targeted funding for research and data collection on women of color; and the overall lack of a demand for evidence-based programs that might underwrite institutional commitments to women of color. Researchers also addressed the ways that standard reporting practices from government agencies raised unnecessary barriers to developing reliable information about the factors that contribute to poor outcomes for women of color.

== Publications and media ==
=== Publications ===
All published reports from AAPF can be found at: http://www.aapf.org/publications/

=== Media ===
- The Urgency of Intersectionality, Kimberlé Crenshaw at TED, December 7, 2016. URL: https://www.youtube.com/watch?v=akOe5-UsQ2o
- "On Intersectionality," Kimberlé Crenshaw's Keynote Speech at WOW 2016, sponsored by the Southbank Centre. URL:
- https://www.youtube.com/watch?v=-DW4HLgYPlA&t=872s
- Kimberlé Crenshaw Discusses 'Intersectional Feminism,' Lafayette College. URL: https://www.youtube.com/watch?v=ROwquxC_Gxc
- Kimberlé Crenshaw, "Race, Gender, Inequality and Intersectionality," Brown University, February 27, 2015. URL: https://www.youtube.com/watch?v=KNKbGFoYC1Q
- "AAPF Co-Founder Kimberlé Crenshaw," PBS. The Tavis Smiley Show, February 26, 2015. URL: http://www.pbs.org/wnet/tavissmiley/interviews/aapf-co-founder-kimberle-crenshaw/

=== Works by Kimberlé Crenshaw ===
- "Why intersectionality can't wait." The Washington Post. September 24, 2015. https://www.washingtonpost.com/news/in-theory/wp/2015/09/24/why-intersectionality-cant-wait/
- Critical Race theory: The Key Writings That Formed the Movement. Published: May 1, 1996
- Words that Wound: Critical Race Theory, Assaultive Speech and the First Amendment
- The Race Track:Understanding and Challenging Structural Racism. Published: July 30, 2013
- Reaffirming Racism:The faulty logic of Colorblindness, Remedy and Diversity. Published: June 4, 2013
- Mapping the Margins: Intersectionality, Identity Politics and Violence against Women of Color
- On Intersectionality: Essential Writings of Kimberlé Crenshaw. Expected Publication: August, 2017

=== Works by Luke Harris ===
- "Black Girls Matter": An Interview with Kimberle Crenshaw and Luke Harris. The Feminist Wire, 2015. http://www.thefeministwire.com/2015/02/black-girls-matter-an-interview-with-kimberle-crenshaw-and-luke-harris/
- "We Need to be our Brother's and Sister's Keeper," Black Press USA, 2014. http://www.blackpressusa.com/we-need-to-be-our-brothers-and-sisters-keeper/
- Co-writer and chief consultant for the documentary A Question of Color, 1993 with Kathe Sandler. http://newsreel.org/video/A-QUESTION-OF-COLOR
- "The Myth of Preferential Treatment: A Transformative Critique of the Terms of the Affirmative Action Debate" Luke C. Harris and Uma Narayan. Harvard Blackletter Law Journal, Vol. 11, No. 1, 1994.
- "Rethinking the Terms of the Affirmative Action Debate Established in The Regents of the University of California v. Bakke Decision." JAI Press Inc. Research in Politics and Society, Vol. 6, 1999.
- "My Two Mothers, America, and the Million Man March," 1999.
- "Prologue: Brief of Amici Curiae on Behalf of Concerned Black Graduates of ABA Accredited Law Schools," Michigan Journal of Race and Law, 2004.
- "Affirmative Action as Equalizing Opportunity: Challenging the Myth of Preferential Treatment" with Uma Narayan. Hugh LaFollette's Ethics in Practice, Blackwell Press (Oxford England), 3rd edition, 2006.
