= Mara Viveros Vigoya =

Colombian academic (born 1956)

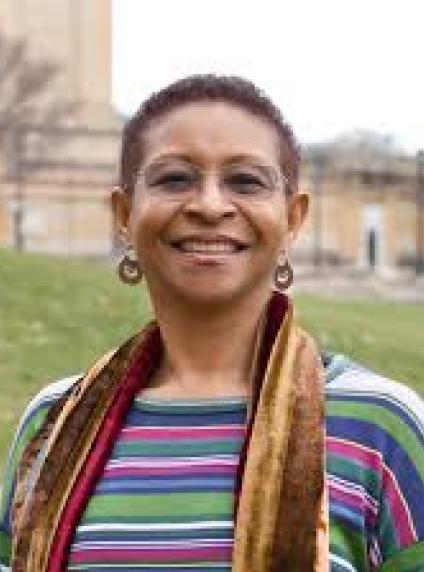
- Born: February 6, 1956 (age 70); Cali, Colombia
- Occupations: Professor, writer

Mara Viveros Vigoya (born February 6, 1956) is a Colombian academic.

== Life ==
Viveros Vigoya was born in Cali, Colombia on February 6, 1956. She studied at the Lycée Français Paul Valéry de Cali and received her PhD in Anthropology at the Ecole des Hautes Etudes en Sciences Sociales in Paris (EHESS).

She is a professor at the Department of Anthropology and the School of Gender Studies at the Universidad Nacional de Colombia in Bogotá, Colombia where she has taught and conducted research since 1998. She is also the co-director of Research Group "Interdisciplinary Group for Gender Studies".

She has participated as a member of the School of Social Science at the Institute for Advanced Study in Princeton (NJ) and has been invited, at the Institut des Hautes Etudes sur l’Amérique Latine (IHEAL) and the EHESS of Paris, the Federal University of Bahia in Brazil and the Center for Gender Studies (CALAS) at the Universidad de Guadalajara and UAM-Xochimilco (Mexico). She was the president of the Latin American Studies Association.

Her research interests include issues related to the relationship between social differences and inequalities, and intersections of gender, sexuality, class, race and ethnicity in the social dynamics of Latin American societies. She has published on these subjects.

== Published works ==
=== Books (as author, coauthor and editor) ===
- 2022 - El oxímoron de las clases negras: movilidad social e interseccionalidad en Colombia; Mara Viveros Vigoya (autora). Guadalajara; Quito: Universidad de Guadalajara: CALAS: FLACSO Ecuador.
- 2019 - Antropología y feminismo; Alhena Caicedo, Lila Abu-Lughod, Mara Viveros Vigoya, Diana Gómez Correal, Diana Ojeda; Asociación Colombiana de Antropología (ACANT)
- 2013 - Saberes culturales y derechos sexuales en Colombia; Mara Viveros Vigoya (author), Tercer Mundo Editores
- 2011 - El género: una categoria útil para las ciencias sociales. Luz Gabriela Arango Gaviria, Mara Viveros Vigoya (editoras). Universidad Nacional de Colombia, Facultad de Ciencias Humanas, Escuela de Estudios de Género.
- 2008 - Raza, etnicidad y sexualidades. Ciudadanía y multiculturalismo; Mara Viveros Vigoya, Peter Wade and Fernando Urrea Giraldo (editors); Universidad Nacional de Colombia
- 2006 - Discursos sobre el colonialismo (Cuestiones De Antagonismo/ Antagonism Matters); Aimé Césaire (author), Beñat Baltza Álvarez, Juan Mari Madariaga, Mara Viveros Vigoya (translators); Ediciones Akal
- 2002 -
- 2001 - Cuerpo, Diferencias y Desigualdades (Spanish Edition); Mara Viveros Vigoya (author); Gloria Garay Ariza (author); Universidad Externado de Colombia

=== Monographs (selection) ===
- 2021. El oxímoron de las clases medias negras. Movilidad social e interseccionalidad en Colombia. Guadalajara / Bielefeld / San José / Quito / Bueno Aires: CALAS.
- 2018. Les couleurs de la Masculinité. Expériences intersectionnelles et pratiques de pouvoir, en: Amérique Latine, Paris : Editions la Découverte.
- 2018. As cores da masculinidade Experiências interseccionais e práticas de poder na Nossa América, Rio de Janeiro: Papéis Selvagens.

=== Articles / Chapters (selection) ===
- 2022. Fernando García, Antonio Sérgio Guimarães, Emiko Saldívar, and Mara Viveros-Vigoya. "The formation of mestizo nations". En: Against Racism: Organizing for Social Change in Latin America. Monica Moreno Figueroa, Peter Wade (eds.). University of Pittsburg Press, pp. 28-50.
- 2022. Mónica G. Moreno Figueroa and Mara Viveros-Vigoya. "Anti-racism, intersectionality, and the struggle for dignity". En: Against Racism: Organizing for Social Change in Latin America. Monica Moreno Figueroa, Peter Wade (eds.). University of Pittsburg Press, pp. 51-72.
- 2018. "Race, Indigeneity and Gender: Colombian Feminism Learning, Lessons for Global Feminism". En: James W Messerschmidt, Patricia Yancey Martin, Michael A. Messner & Raewyn Connell (eds.), Gender Reckonings. New Social Theory and Research, New York: New York University Press, pp. 90–110.
- 2018. "De la extraversión a las epistemologías nuestramericanas: Un descentramiento en clave feminista". En: Santiago Gómez Obando, Catherine Moore Torres y Leopoldo Múnera Ruiz (coords.): Los saberes múltiples y las ciencias sociales y políticas, Bogotá, Universidad Nacional de Colombia, pp. 171–192.
- 2017. Viveros, Mara y Oyeronke Oyewumi: "La invención de las mujeres. Una perspectiva africana sobre los discursos occidentales del género. Bogotá: en la Frontera". En: Revista LiminaR, Estudios Sociales y Humanísticos, 16 (1). 2013–2206.
- 2017. "Les études de genre et les mouvements ethnico-raciaux en Colombie. Entre méfiances et défis, en: Régions & Cohésion, 7 (3). 95-110.
- 2016. "Masculinities in the continuum of violence in Latin America". En: Feminist Theory, 17 (2). 229–237.
- 2015. "Social Mobility, Whiteness, and Whitening in Colombia" En: The Journal of Latin American and Caribbean Anthropology, 20 (3). 496–512
- 2015. "L’intersectionnalité au prisme du féminisme latinoaméricain". En: Raisons Politiques, (58). 39–54.
- 2015. "Sex/Gender". En: Lisa Disch and Mary Hawkesworth (coords.): The Oxford Handbook of Feminist Theory, Oxford: Oxford University Press. 852–874.
- 2015. "The sexual erotic market as an analytical framework for understanding erotic-affective exchanges in interracial sexually intimate and affective relationships". En: Culture, Health & Sexuality, 17 (1). 1–13
- 2014. Viveros Vigoya, Mara y Lesmes Espinel, Sergio. "Cuestiones raciales y construcción de Nación en tiempos de multiculturalismo". En: Universitas Humanistica, (77). 13–31.
