= Say Their Names =

2020 mural in Louisville, Kentucky, U.S.

- Photographed in 2023
- Artist: Whitney Holbourn
- Year: 2020
- Location: Louisville, Kentucky, U.S.
- 38.25811°N 85.76819°W

Say Their Names is a 2020 mural in Louisville, Kentucky.

== Description and history ==
Unveiled in July 2020, the artwork depicts the faces of Sandra Bland, George Floyd, David McAtee, Elijah McClain, and Breonna Taylor. It was vandalized in June 2021. Artist Whitney Holbourn repaired the mural and added the face of Travis Nagdy.

The phrase "Say Their Names" was coined to bring attention to victims of systemic racism and racial injustice in the United States. The movement stems from the 2014 movement SayHerName in response to the death of Bland, and has since gained significant traction when discussing racial injustice in the United States.

== See also ==
- 2020 in art
