= Kimberlé Crenshaw =

American legal academic (born 1959)

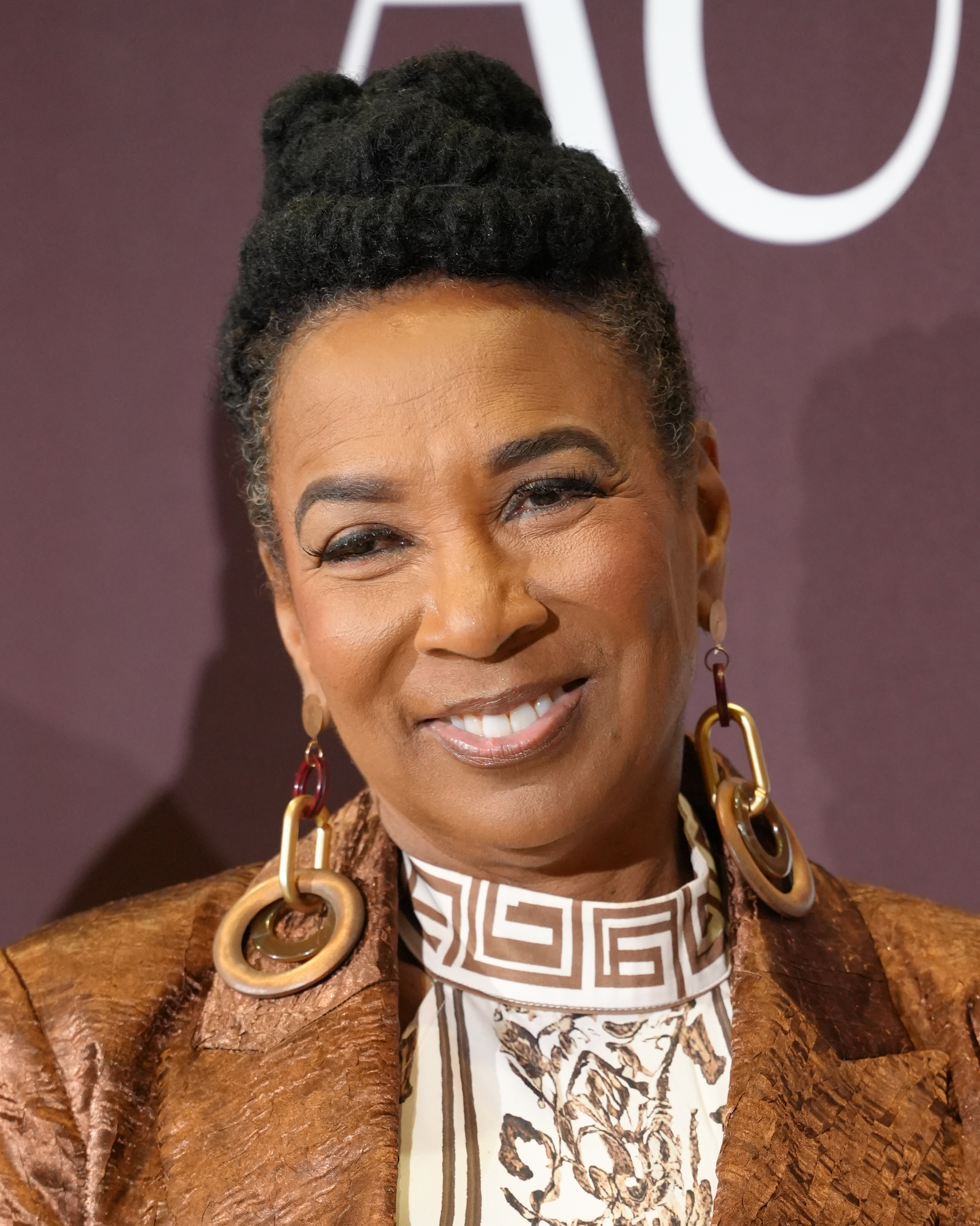
- Crenshaw at 2026 Essence Festival of Culture
- Born: Kimberlé Williams Crenshaw; May 5, 1959 (age 67); Canton, Ohio, US
- Other name: Kim Crenshaw
- Occupations: Academic; activist

Academic background
- Education: Cornell University; Harvard University; University of Wisconsin

Academic work
- Discipline: Law
- School or tradition: Critical race theory; feminist legal theory
- Institutions: University of California, Los Angeles; Columbia University
- Notable ideas: Intersectionality

Kimberlé Williams Crenshaw FBA (born May 5, 1959) is an American civil rights advocate and a scholar of critical race theory. She is a professor at the UCLA School of Law and Columbia Law School, where she specializes in race and gender issues.

Crenshaw is known for introducing and developing the concept of intersectionality, also known as intersectional theory, the study of how overlapping or intersecting social identities, particularly minority identities, relate to systems and structures of oppression, domination, or discrimination.

Her work further expands to include intersectional feminism, which is a sub-category related to intersectional theory. Intersectional feminism examines the overlapping systems of oppression and discrimination that women face due to their ethnicity, sexuality, and economic background. She was made a Fellow of the British Academy in 2026.

== Early life and education ==
Crenshaw was born in Canton, Ohio, on May 5, 1959, to parents Marian and Walter Clarence Crenshaw Jr. From a young age, Crenshaw's parents encouraged her to discuss "interesting things" that she "observed in the world that day". This early training would become the basis of her career choices later in life.

Crenshaw experienced traumatic incidents during her youth, including the sudden death of her father at the age of 34, the shooting death of her older brother Mantel, and physical abuse at the hands of a fellow college student.

Crenshaw attended Canton McKinley High School. In 1981, she received a bachelor's degree in government and Africana studies from Cornell University, where she was a member of the Quill and Dagger senior Honors Society. She received a JD from Harvard Law School in 1984. In 1985, she received an LLM from the University of Wisconsin Law School, where she was a William H. Hastie Fellow and law clerk to Wisconsin Supreme Court Judge Shirley Abrahamson.

== Career ==
After completing her LLM, Crenshaw joined the faculty of the UCLA School of Law in 1986. She is a founder of the field of critical race theory and a lecturer on civil rights, critical race studies, and constitutional law. At UCLA School of Law, as of 2017, she taught four classes, Advanced Critical Race Theory, Civil Rights, Intersectional Perspectives on Race, Gender, and the Criminalization of Women & Girls, and Race, Law and Representation.

In 1991, Crenshaw assisted the legal team representing Anita Hill at the US Senate confirmation hearings for Supreme Court Justice Clarence Thomas. In both 1991 and 1994, she was elected professor of the year by matriculating students. In 1995, Crenshaw was appointed full professor at Columbia Law School, where she was the founder and director of the Center for Intersectionality and Social Policy Studies, established in 2011. At Columbia Law School, Kimberlé W. Crenshaw's courses include an intersectionalities workshop and another focused specifically on civil rights.

In 1996, Crenshaw became the co-founder and executive director of the African American Policy Forum (AAPF), a think tank focused on "dismantling structural inequality" and "advancing and expanding racial justice, gender equality, and the indivisibility of all human rights, both in the U.S. and internationally." Its mission is to build bridges between scholarly research and public discourse in addressing inequality and discrimination. Crenshaw has been awarded the Fulbright Chair for Latin America in Brazil, and in 2008, she was awarded an in-residence fellowship at the Center for Advanced Behavioral Studies at Stanford.

In 2001, Crenshaw wrote the background paper on Race and Gender Discrimination for the United Nations World Conference on Racism, helped to facilitate the addition of gender in the WCAR Conference Declaration, served as a member of the National Science Foundation's Committee to Research Violence Against Women and the National Research Council panel on Research on Violence Against Women. Crenshaw was a member of the Domestic Strategy Group at the Aspen Institute from 1992 to 1995, the Women's Media Initiative, and is a regular commentator on NPR's The Tavis Smiley Show.

In 2020, Crenshaw received an honorary doctorate from the KU Leuven. She has authored several books and articles and continues to publish. Crenshaw's book with Luke Charles Harris and George Lipsitz, The Race Track: How the Myth of Equal Opportunity Defeats Racial Justice, was published in hardback in 2023. Her autobiography Backtalker: An American Memoir came out on May 5, 2026.

=== Intersectionality ===
External videos
- Kimberlé Crenshaw - On Intersectionality - keynote - WOW 2016: Southbank Centre

==== Origins of the concept ====
In 1989, Crenshaw coined the term intersectionality in her essay "Demarginalizing the Intersection of Race and Sex: A Black Feminist Critique of Anti-discrimination Doctrine, Feminist Theory, and Antiracist Politics" as a way to help explain the oppression of African-American women. The idea of intersectionality existed long before Crenshaw coined the term but was not widely recognized until Crenshaw's work. Black feminist trailblazers like Sojourner Truth in her 1851 speech "Ain't I a Woman?" and Anna Julia Cooper in her 1892 essay "The Colored Woman's Office" exemplified intersectional ideas long before the term was coined. Frances M. Beal wrote an influential pamphlet in 1969 entitled "Double Jeopardy: To Be Black and Female." Crenshaw's inspiration for the theory started while she was still in college at Cornell University when she realized that the gender aspect of race was extremely underdeveloped.

==== Crenshaw's arguments ====
Crenshaw's work on intersectionality focuses on how the law responds to issues that include gender and race discrimination. One particular challenge is that anti-discrimination laws consider gender and race separately. Consequently, African-American women and other women of color who experience overlapping forms of discrimination are left with no justice as well as immense ignorance. Anti-discrimination laws and the justice system's attempt to remedy discrimination are limited and operate on a single axis, only accounting for one identity at a time. A complete and understandable definition has not been written in the law; therefore, when the issues of intersectionality are presented in a court of law, if one form of discrimination cannot be proved without the other, then there is no law broken. The law defines discrimination as unfair treatment based on a certain identity. When enforcing the law, justice goes by the definition, and if discrimination cannot be proven based on a single identity, such as sex, then no crime has been committed.

Crenshaw has referred to DeGraffenreid v. General Motors in writing, interviews, and lectures. In DeGraffenreid v. General Motors, a group of African-American women argued they received intersectional discrimination, excluding them from employment opportunities. They contended that although women were eligible for office and secretarial jobs, such positions were only offered to white women, barring African-American women from seeking employment in the company. The courts weighed the allegations of race and gender discrimination separately, finding that the employment of African-American male factory workers disproved racial discrimination, and the employment of white female office workers disproved gender discrimination. Accordingly, the court declined to consider intersectional discrimination and dismissed the case.

Crenshaw has also discussed intersectionality in connection to her experience as part of the 1991 legal team for Anita Hill, the woman who accused then-Supreme Court nominee Clarence Thomas of sexual harassment. The case drew two groups with contrasting views: white feminists in support of Hill; opposing African-Americans who supported Clarence Thomas. One line of the argument focused on the rights of women and Hill's experience of being violated as a woman. The other focused on mitigating the conduct of Thomas to allow him to become the second African American to serve on the United States Supreme Court.

Crenshaw argued that with these two groups rising against one another during this case, Anita Hill lost her voice as a black woman. She had been unintentionally chosen to support the women's side, unintentionally silencing her racial identity in the process. "It was like one of these moments where you literally feel that you have been kicked out of your community, all because you are trying to introduce and talk about the way that African American women have experienced sexual harassment and violence. It was a defining moment." "Many women who talk about the Anita Hill thing," Crenshaw adds, "celebrate what's happened with women in general.... Sexual harassment is now recognized. What's not doing as well is the recognition of black women's unique experiences with discrimination."

Crenshaw also discussed the theory of intersectionality in a TED Talk in October 2016. Additionally, Crenshaw delivered a keynote speech at the Women of the World festival at the Southbank Centre in London, England, in 2016. She spoke on women of color's unique challenges in the struggle for gender equality, racial justice and well-being. In her 2016 TED Talk and keynote speech, she discussed a key challenge women of color face: police brutality. She highlighted the #SayHerName campaign aimed at uplifting the stories of black women killed by police. The focus on the victimization of black women in the SayHerName movement draws from the theory of intersectionality which Crenshaw describes thus: "It's like a lazy Susan – you can subject race, sexuality, transgender identity or class to a feminist critique through intersectionality."

Since the 2010s, Crenshaw has spoken out against misinterpretations of intersectionality, saying that some have wrongfully characterized it as a blanket term for "complicated" problems, "identity politics on steroids," or "a mechanism to turn white men into new pariahs." Instead, Crenshaw characterizes intersectionality as,

a lens, a prism, for seeing the way in which various forms of inequality often operate together and exacerbate each other. We tend to talk about race inequality as separate from inequality based on gender, class, sexuality or immigration status. What's often missing is how some people are subject to all of these, and the experience is not just a sum of its parts.

=== My Brother's Keeper ===
A nationwide initiative to open up a ladder of opportunities to youth males and males of color. Crenshaw and the other participants of the African American Forum have demonstrated through multiple means of the media to express that the initiative has good intentions but perpetrates for the uplifting of youth but excludes girls and youth girls of color. She wrote an op-ed article in The New York Times emphasizing the problems with the initiative. The AAPF has started a campaign #WHYWECANTWAIT to address the realignment of the "My Brothers Keeper" initiative to include all youth boys, girls, and those girls and boys of color. The movement has received much support from all over, letters signed by men of color, letters signed by women of color, and letters signed by allies that believe in the cause.

In an interview on the Laura Flanders Show, Crenshaw expressed that the program was introduced as response to the widespread grief from the African-American community after the acquittal of George Zimmerman in the case of his shooting and killing of Trayvon Martin, an unarmed African-American teenage boy. She describes the program as a "feel-good" and fatherly initiative but does not believe that it is a significant or structural program that will help fight the rollback of civil rights; the initiative will not provide the kinds of things that will really make a difference. She believes that because women and girls of color are a part of the same communities and disadvantages as the underprivileged males that are focused on the initiative, in order to make it an effective program for the communities, it needs to include all members of the community, girls and boys alike.

- #Why we can't wait: Women of Color Urging Inclusion in "My Brother's Keeper"
- June 17, 2014 – a letter from more than 1000 girls and women of color

The letter is signed by women of all ages and a variety of backgrounds, including high-school teens, professional actors, civil rights activists, and university professors commending President Obama and the efforts of the White House, private philanthropy, and social justice organizations, while also urging the inclusion of young women and girls. The realignment would be essential "to reflect the values of inclusion, equal opportunity and shared fate that has propelled our historic struggle for racial justice moving forward".

- May 30, 2014 – a letter of 200 Concerned Black Men and Other Men of Color calling for the Inclusion of Women and Girls in "My Brothers Keeper"

The letter is signed by a multitude of diverse men with different lifestyles, including scholars, recently incarcerated, taxi drivers, pastors, college students, fathers of sons, fathers of daughters and more. All the men believe that the girls within the communities where these men share homes, schools, and recreational areas share a fate with one another and that the initiative is lacking in focus if that focus does not include both genders.

== Influence ==
Crenshaw is known for establishing the concept of intersectionality, which examines how race, class, gender, and other characteristics overlap and compound to explain systemic discrimination and inequality in society. Crenshaw has served as a leader and activist on civil rights, race, intersectionality, and the law throughout United States and globally. Crenshaw's work on intersectionality was influential in drafting the equality clause in the Constitution of South Africa. In 2001, Crenshaw wrote a paper on Race and Gender discrimination for the United Nations' World Conference on Racism which was leading in creating policy that benefiting minority groups globally. Additionally, Crenshaw advocated for the inclusion of gender in the WCAR conference.

Since the 2010s, Crenshaw has advocated for the #SayHerName movement. She co-authored (with Andrea Ritchie) Say Her Name: Resisting Police Brutality Against Black Women, documenting and drawing attention to black women victims of police brutality and anti-black violence in the United States. Additionally, Crenshaw attended the Women of the World festival, which took place from 8–13 March 2016 at the Southbank Centre in London, where she delivered a keynote speech on the unique challenges facing women of color, a key challenge being police brutality against black women. She promoted the #SayHerName campaign, aimed at uplifting the stories of black women killed by the police.

In 2017, Crenshaw gave an hour-long lecture to a maximum-capacity crowd of attendees at Rapaporte Treasure Hall at Brandeis University. She explained the role intersectionality plays in modern-day society. After a three-day celebration of her work, University President Ron Liebowitz presented Crenshaw with the Toby Gittler award at a ceremony following the lecture. That same year, Crenshaw was invited to moderate a Sexual Harassment Panel hosted by Women in Animation and The Animation Guild, Local 839. Crenshaw discussed the history of harassment in the workplace and transitioned the discussion to how it plays a role in today's work environments. The other panelists with Crenshaw agreed that there had been many protective measures placed to combat sexual harassment in the workplace. However, many issues remain to be resolved for a complete settlement of the problem at hand.

In 2021, Crenshaw was elected to the American Academy of Arts and Sciences for her innovative work and accomplishments in pioneering intersectionality, civil rights, critical race theory, and the law. Also in 2021, Crenshaw gave a question and answer interview with Jon Wiener, contributing editor to The Nation, a weekly magazine in the US, and addressed the political and ideological backlash to critical race theory, stating: "Wherever there is race reform, there's inevitably retrenchment."

== Publications ==
=== Books ===
- Critical Race Theory: The Key Writings That Formed the Movement, May 1, 1996. A compilation of some of the most important writings that formed and sustained the critical race theory (CRT) movement. The book includes articles from Derrick Bell, Richard Delgado, Mari Matsuda, Anthony Cook, Duncan Kennedy, Gary Peller, Kimberlé Crenshaw, and others. All of the articles add something to CRT, and read independently, add significant portions to the CRT movement.
- Words that Wound: Critical Race Theory, Assaultive Speech and the First Amendment, 1993.
- The Race Track: Understanding and Challenging Structural Racism, July 30, 2013
- Reaffirming Racism: The faulty logic of Colorblindness, Remedy and Diversity, 2013
- Black Girls Matter: Pushed Out, Over Policed and Under Protected. 2016. A report based on new reviews of national data and personal interviews with young women in Boston and New York.
- Mapping the Margins: Intersectionality, Identity Politics and Violence against Women of Color, January 25, 2010. Crenshaw is responding to the tendency within identity politics to overlook or silence intra-group differences, a dynamic repeated throughout anti-racist and feminist movements to the detriment of black women. She explores the simultaneously raced and gendered dimensions of violence against women of color (looking specifically at responses to domestic violence and rape) to draw attention to how the specificity of black women's experiences of violence is ignored, overlooked, misrepresented, and/or silenced. Crenshaw focuses on both the structural and political aspects of intersectionality with regard to rape and domestic abuse. She uses this analysis of violence against women of color to highlight the importance of intersectionality and of engaging with issues like violence against women through an intersectional lens.
- On Intersectionality: Essential Writings of Kimberlé Crenshaw, September 24, 2015. Forthcoming. Essays and articles that help define the concept of intersectionality. Crenshaw provides insight from the Central Park jogger, Anita Hill's testimony against now Supreme Court justice Clarence Thomas and other significant matters of public interest.
- Seeing Race Again: Countering Colorblindness across the Disciplines (edited by Kimberlé Williams Crenshaw, Luke Charles Harris, Daniel Martinez HoSang, and George Lipsitz, University of California Press, 2019)
- The Race Track: How the Myth of Equal Opportunity Defeats Racial Justice (with Luke Charles Harris & George Lipsitz), December 2025. The Race Track dispenses with the myth of post-racial America, explaining not only why race matters more than ever but also twenty-first-century solutions to racial injustice. The book will provide a framework for understanding how and why structural racism survives in the present.
- #SayHerName: Black Women's Stories of State Violence and Public Silence (by Kimberlé Crenshaw and African American Policy Forum, foreword by Janelle Monáe), Haymarket Books, July 2023. Centering Black women's experiences in police violence and gender violence discourses sends the powerful message that, in fact, all Black lives matter and that the police cannot kill without consequence. This is a powerful story of Black feminist practice, community-building, enablement, and Black feminist reckoning.
- Backtalker: An American Memoir, May 5, 2026

=== Articles ===
- "Traffic at the Crossroads: Multiple Oppressions" in the 2003 anthology Sisterhood Is Forever: The Women's Anthology for a New Millennium, edited by Robin Morgan.
- "Say Her Name: Resisting Police Brutality Against Black Women" (with Andrea J. Ritchie, Rachel Anspach, Rachel Gilmer, Luker Harris, Columbia Law School, 2015)
- "How Colorblindness Flourished in the Age of Obama", in Seeing Race Again: Countering Colorblindness across the Disciplines (edited by Kimberlé Williams Crenshaw, Luke Charles Harris, Daniel Martinez HoSang, and George Lipsitz, University of California Press, 2019)
- "Unmasking Colorblindness in the Law: Lessons from the Formation of Critical Race Theory", in Seeing Race Again: Countering Colorblindness across the Disciplines (edited by Kimberlé Williams Crenshaw, Luke Charles Harris, Daniel Martinez HoSang, and George Lipsitz, University of California Press, 2019).
- "An Intersectional Critique of Tiers of Scrutiny: Beyond 'Either/Or' Approaches to Equal Protection" (with Devon W. Carbado), 129 The Yale Law Journal Forum 108 (2019).
- "We Still Have not Learned from Anita Hill's Testimony", 26 UCLA Women's Law Journal 17 (2019).
- "Race Liberalism and the Deradicalization of Racial Reform", 130 Harvard Law Review 2298 (2017).
- "Toward a Field of Intersectionality Studies: Theory, Applications, and Praxis" (with Sumi Cho and Leslie McCall), 38 (4) Signs: Journal of Women in Culture and Society 785 (2013).
- "Keeping Up With Jim Jones: Pioneer, Taskmaster, Architect, Trailblazer", 2013 Wisconsin Law Review 703 (2013).
- "From Private Violence to Mass Incarceration: Thinking Intersectionally About Women, Race, and Social Control", 59 UCLA Law Review 1418 (2012).
- "Race, Reform and Retrenchment: Transformation and Legitimation in Antidiscrimination Law", 12 German Law Review 247 (2011).
- "Twenty Years of Critical Race Theory: Looking Back to Move Forward", 43 Connecticut Law Review 1253–1352 (2011).
- "Close Encounters of Three Kinds: On Teaching Dominance, Feminism, and Intersectionality", 46 Tulsa Law Review, 151–89 (2010). Symposium: Catharine MacKennon.
- Framing Affirmative Action, 105 Michigan Law Review First Impressions 123 (2007).
- "A Black Feminist Critique of Antidiscrimination Law", in Philosophical Problems in the Law, 339–343, 4th edn (edited by David M. Adams, Wadsworth, 2005).
- "The First Decade: Critical Reflections, or 'A Foot in the Closing Door'", 49 UCLA Law Review 1343–72 (2002).
- "Opening Remarks: Reclaiming Yesterday's Future", 47 UCLA Law Review 1459–65 (2000).
- "Playing Race Cards: Constructing a Pro-active Defense of Affirmative Action", 16 National Black Law Journal 196–214 (1998).
- Foreword, in Black Men on Race, Gender and Sexuality: A Critical Reader (edited by Devon W. Carbado, New York University Press, 1999).
- "The Contradictions of Mainstream Constitutional Theory" (with Gary Peller), 45 UCLA Law Review 1683–1715 (1998). Symposium: Voices of the People: Essays on Constitutional Democracy In Memory of Professor Julian N. Eule.
- "Color-blind Dreams and Racial Nightmares: Reconfiguring Racism in the Post-Civil Rights Era", in Birth of A Nation'hood: Gaze, Script and Spectacle in the O.J. Simpson Trial (edited by Toni Morrison and Claudia Brodsky LaCour, Pantheon Books, 1997).
- Panel Presentation on Cultural Battery, 25 University of Toledo Law Review 891–901 (1994).
- "Beyond Racism and Misogyny: Black Feminism and 2 Live Crew", in Words That Wound: Critical Race Theory, Assaultive Speech and the First Amendment (Westview, 1998). Also published in Feminist Social Thought: A Reader. edited by Diana Tietjens Meyers, Routledge (1997).
- "Reel Time/Real Justice" (with Gary Peller), 70 Denver University Law Review 283–96 (1993). Colloquy: Racism in the Wake of the Los Angeles Riots.
- "Race, Gender, and Sexual Harassment", 65 Southern California Law Review 1467–76 (1992).
- "Running from Race" (Commentary on the Democrats' Discourse on Race) (with Gary Peller), 7 Taken 13–17 (1992).
- "Whose Story Is It, Anyway? Feminist and Antiracist Appropriations of Anita Hill", in Race-ing Justice, En-gendering Power, 402–40 (edited by Toni Morrison, Pantheon Books, 1992).
- "Mapping the Margins: Intersectionality, Identity Politics, and Violence Against Women of Color", 43 Stanford Law Review 1241–99 (1991). Women of Color at the Center: Selections from the Third National Conference on Women of Color and the Law.
- "Demarginalizing the Intersection of Race and Sex: A Black Feminist Critique of Antidiscrimination Doctrine, Feminist Theory and Antiracist Politics", 1989 University of Chicago Legal Forum 139–67 (1989). Reprinted in The Politics of Law: A Progressive Critique 195-217 (2nd edn., edited by David Kairys, Pantheon, 1990).
- "Toward a Race-Conscious Pedagogy in Legal Education" (Foreword: Voting Rights: Strategies for Legal and Community Action), 11 National Black Law Journal 1–14 (1989).
- "Race, Reform, and Retrenchment: Transformation and Legitimation in Antidiscrimination Law", 101 Harvard Law Review 1331–87 (1988). Reprinted in Critical Legal Thought: An American-German Debate (edited by Christian Joerges and David M. Trubek, Nomos, 1989).

== Awards and honors ==
- 1985: William H. Hastie Fellow
- 1991: Professor of the Year, UCLA School of Law
- 1994: Professor of the Year, UCLA School of Law
- 2007; Fulbright Chair for Latin America in Brazil
- 2008: recipient of Alphonse Fletcher Fellowship
- 2008: fellow, Center for Advanced Behavioral Studies in the Social Sciences, Stanford University
- 2015: No. 1 Most Inspiring Feminist, Ms. Magazine
- 2015: "Power 100" Ebony Magazine
- 2016: Outstanding Scholar Award, Fellows of the American Bar Foundation (ABF)
- 2017: Gittler Prize
- 2021: Ruth Bader Ginsburg Lifetime Service Award, Association of American Law Schools (AALS)
- 2021: Triennial Award, Association of American Law Schools (AALS)
- 2021: Elected to the American Academy of Arts and Sciences
- 2023: C.-E.A. Winslow Award
- 2025: Sojourner Truth Award, Association of African American Life and History
- 2026: Fellow of the British Academy

== Sources ==
- UCLA Law Professors: Kimberlé W. Crenshaw
- Alkalimat, Abdul (2004). The African American Experience in Cyberspace. Pluto Press. ISBN 0-7453-2222-0.
- "O.J. Verdict Interviews: Kimberlé Williams Crenshaw". Frontline. PBS. April 22, 2005.
