= Lycée Français Paul Valéry de Cali =

Lycée Français Paul Valéry de Cali (LPFV; Spanish: Liceo Francés "Paul Valéry" de Cali) is a French international school in Cali, Colombia. It serves preschool levels, through to the final year of senior high school, terminale.

The school was founded in October 1956 to bring French education to the city. It had a number of venues until it moved to a permanent location in 1967 to La Flora, a neighborhood at the north of the city.

Under the directorship of headmaster Slavomir Draschler the school graduated its first class in 1970.

In 2022 the school moved to a new countryside venue in Arroyohondo (Yumbo).

== Notable alumni ==
- Catalina García, lead vocalist of Monsieur Periné
- Valentina Acosta, Colombian actress
- Mara Viveros Vigoya, anthropologist and writer
- Georges Bougaud, a French-Colombian entrepreuneur (Recamier)
