= Intersectionality =

Theory of discrimination

An intersectional analysis considers a collection of factors that affect a social individual in combination, rather than considering each factor in isolation, as illustrated here using a Venn diagram.

Intersectionality is an analytical framework for understanding how groups' and individuals' social and political identities result in unique combinations of discrimination and privilege. Examples of these intersecting and overlapping factors include gender, caste, sex, race, ethnicity, class, sexuality, religion, disability, physical appearance, and age. These factors can lead to both empowerment and oppression.

Intersectionality arose in reaction to both white feminism and the then male-dominated Black liberation movement, citing the "interlocking oppressions" of racism, sexism, and heteronormativity. It broadens the scope of the first and second waves of feminism, which largely focused on the experiences of women who were white, cisgender, and middle-class, to include the different experiences of women of color, poor women, immigrant women, and other groups, and aims to separate itself from white feminism by acknowledging women's differing experiences and identities.

The term intersectionality was coined by Kimberlé Crenshaw in 1989. She describes how interlocking systems of power affect those who are most marginalized in society. Activists and academics use the framework to promote social and political egalitarianism. Intersectionality opposes analytical systems that treat each axis of oppression in isolation. In this framework, for instance, discrimination against Black women cannot be explained as a simple combination of misogyny and racism, but as something more complicated. While many readers understand intersectionality as the overlapping of multiple social identities (e.g., race, gender, and class), the original intent was to provide an internal framework for analyzing systems of oppression and privilege that interlock, and to support putting theory into practice for social justice rather than simply cataloguing individual identities.

Intersectionality has heavily influenced modern feminism and gender studies. Its proponents suggest that it promotes a more nuanced and complex approach to addressing power and oppression, rather than offering simplistic answers. Its critics suggest that the concept is too broad or complex, tends to reduce individuals to specific demographic factors, is used as an ideological tool, and is difficult to apply in research contexts. Scholars of postcolonial and transnational feminist studies have also debated the global application of intersectionality.

== Key concepts ==
=== Interlocking matrix of oppression ===
Patricia Hill Collins, author of Intersectionality as Critical Social Theory (2019), refers to the various intersections of social inequality as "vectors of oppression and privilege" that together form a matrix of domination. These concepts describe how people's experiences of privilege and marginalization are shaped not just by individual differences in isolation (e.g., sexual orientation, class, race, age, etc.), but also by the effect of overlaps and interactions between these differences. The impact of a particular factor, such as race, can vary based on the presence or absence of other factors, such as gender or class.

=== Multiple discrimination ===
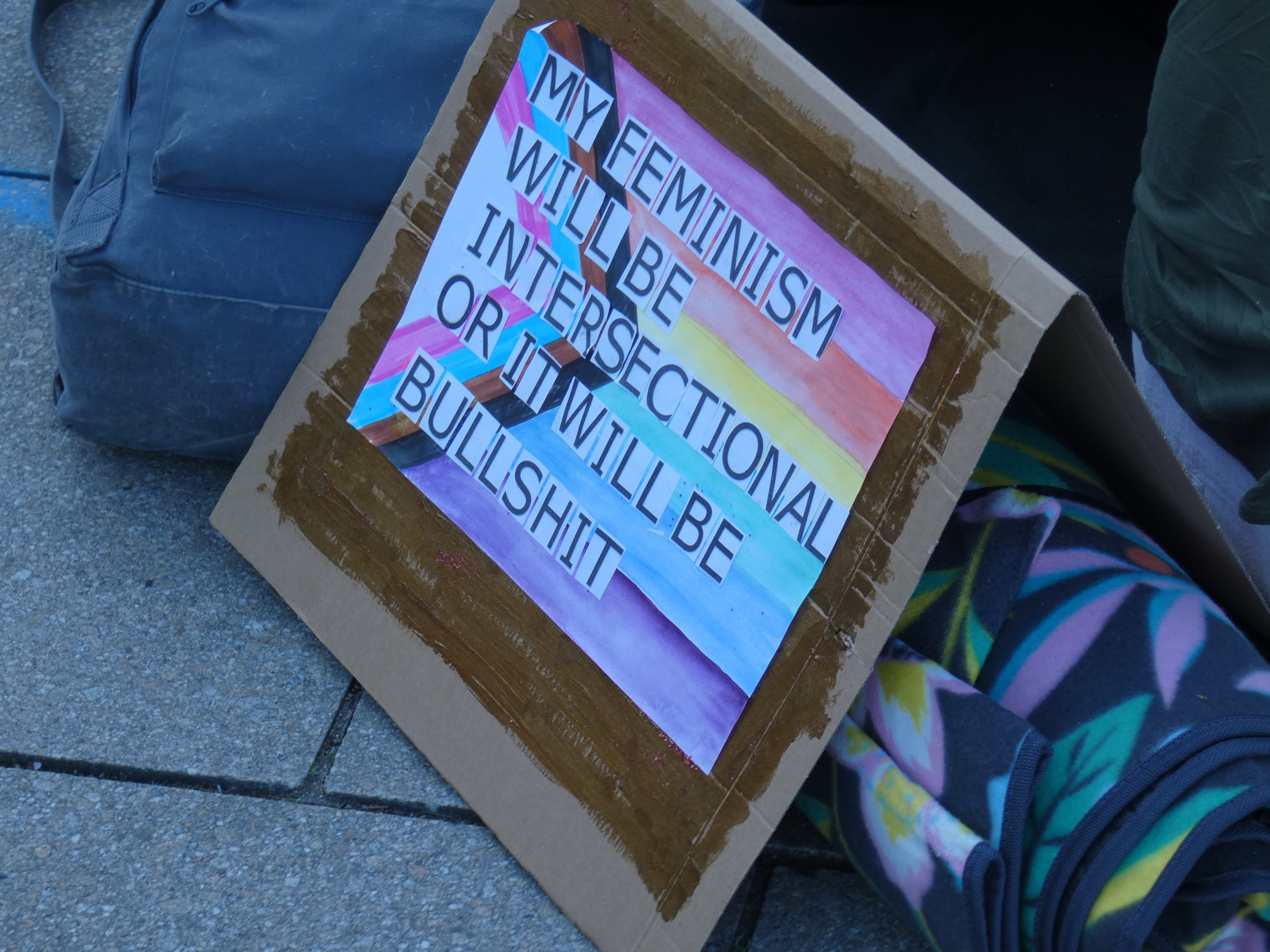
Intersectionality at a Dyke March in Hamburg, Germany, 2020

In the European Union (EU) and UK, "multiple discrimination" refers to discrimination which encompasses more than one social classification (e.g., gender, race, class, religion, sexuality, etc.). These categories, which were previously considered in isolation as defining in their own right, are now increasingly approached as different facets of a person's identity, considered as a multidimensional whole.

=== Standpoint theory ===
Standpoint theory has been described by Patricia Collins and Dorothy E. Smith. A standpoint is an individual's world perspective. Standpoint theory suggests that societal knowledge is subjective, being situated within an individual's specific geographic location and the social conditions under which it was produced.

== History ==
External videos
- Women of the World Festival 2016
- Kimberlé Crenshaw – On Intersectionality via Southbank Centre on YouTube

Black feminist scholar Kimberlé Crenshaw introduced the concept of intersectionality in a pair of essays published in 1989 and 1991 in the field of legal studies. Intersectionality originated in critical race studies and considers the way different forms of oppression (such as racism, sexism, classism, homophobia, and so on) can combine and interact to produce multifaceted systems of oppression and privilege that shape the experiences of individuals. Crenshaw used intersectionality to demonstrate how these intersecting systems of oppression disadvantaged minorities in the workplace and society.

Although Crenshaw introduced the term Intersectionality in 1989, recent scholars emphasize that intersectionality is not a static framework but one that has continued to evolve both before and after its namesake. In a 2023 review of the concept's development, T. Batista argued that intersectionality has undergone significant reinterpretation over time as researchers apply it across new geopolitical, legal, and social contexts. The article notes that while Crenshaw's original formulation emerged from Black feminist legal theory to illustrate how racism and sexism operate simultaneously, contemporary scholars increasingly stress the need to maintain a focus on structures of power rather than reducing the concept to overlapping identities. This ongoing academic debate highlights both the durability of Crenshaw's foundational insights and the expanding range of issues to which intersectionality is now applied.

=== Precursors to intersectionality ===
The historical exclusion of Black women from the feminist movement in the United States resulted in many Black 19th- and 20th-century feminists—including Sojourner Truth, Anna J. Cooper, Maria W. Stewart, Ida B. Wells, and others—challenging their historical exclusion from earlier feminist movements, which were primarily led by white middle-class women who suggested that women were a homogeneous category who shared the same life experiences.

In her 1851 "Ain't I a Woman?" speech, Sojourner Truth spoke from her racialized position as a formerly enslaved woman to critique essentialist notions of femininity. She highlighted the differences between the treatment of white and Black women in society, saying that white women were often regarded as emotional and delicate, while Black women were stereotyped as brutish and subjected to both gendered and racialized abuse. These observations were largely dismissed by many white feminists of the time, who prioritized the suffrage movement over addressing the intersecting oppressions faced by Black women.

Early writers and intellectuals such as Cooper, Stewart, Wells, Stuart Hall, and Nira Yuval-Davis also emphasized the interconnected nature of racial and gender oppressions, prefiguring intersectionality. In her 1892 essay titled "The Colored Woman's Office", Cooper identified Black women as crucial agents of social change, emphasizing their unique understanding of multiple forms of oppression. In her book A Voice from the South (1892), Cooper emphasized the importance of considering the "whole race" by focusing on the lived experiences of Black women. Cooper said that their oppression was not just racial or gender-based but a complex combination of the two. In Russia, Nikolai Yadrintsev's 1867 essay "Women in Siberia in the seventeenth and eighteenth centuries" (Russian: Женщина в Сибири в XVII и XVIII столетиях) noted that indigenous women faced discrimination both due to their non-Russian origin and their gender following the Russian conquest of Siberia, an argument which was further stated by later Siberian regionalist activists.

W. E. B. Du Bois theorized that the intersectional paradigms of race, class, and nation might explain specific aspects of the Black political economy. Patricia Hill Collins writes: "Du Bois saw race, class, and nation not primarily as personal identity categories but as social hierarchies that shaped African-American access to status, poverty, and power."Du Bois nevertheless omitted gender from his theory and considered it more of a personal identity category. In 1947, Pauli Murray used the phrase "Jane Crow" to describe the compounded challenges faced by Black women in the Jim Crow South.

=== Second wave feminism ===
Patricia Hill Collins describes the many proponents of Black, Asian American, Latina, Indigenous, and Chicana feminism active in North America between the 1960s and 1980s as instrumental in the development of intersectionality. In the 1970s and 1980s, a number of non-Western feminists of color also articulated ideas similar to intersectionality, such as Awa Thiam, Chandra Talpade Mohanty, Gayatri Chakravorty Spivak, Chela Sandoval, and others.

In 1974, a group of Black feminists organized the Combahee River Collective in Boston, Massachusetts, in response to what they felt was an alienation from both white feminism and the male-dominated Black liberation movement, citing the "interlocking oppressions" of racism, sexism and heteronormativity. The collective developed the concept of "simultaneity": the simultaneous influences of race, class, gender, and sexuality, which informed the members' lives and their resistance to oppression. The Combahee River Collective advanced an understanding of African-American experiences that challenged analyses emerging from Black and male-centered social movements, as well as those from mainstream cisgender, white, middle-class, heterosexual feminists.

In DeGraffenreid v. General Motors (1976), Emma DeGraffenreid and four other Black female auto workers alleged compound employment discrimination as Black women resulting from General Motors' seniority-based system of layoffs. The courts weighed the allegations of race and gender discrimination separately, finding that the employment of African-American men in the factory disproved racial discrimination, and the employment of white women in the offices disproved gender discrimination. The court declined to consider compound discrimination, and dismissed the case. Crenshaw said that in cases such as this, the courts have tended to ignore Black women's unique experiences by treating them as only women or only Black.

In 1978, Senegalese writer Awa Thiam wrote of the "threefold oppression" of racism, sexism, and class oppression which impacted African women:

The Black woman of Africa suffers threefold oppression: by virtue of her sex, she is dominated by man in a patriarchal society; by virtue of her class she is at the mercy of capitalist exploitation; by virtue of her race she suffers from the appropriation of her country by colonial or neo-colonial powers. Sexism, racism, class division; three plagues.

By the 1980s, as second-wave feminism began to recede, scholars of color including Audre Lorde, Gloria E. Anzaldúa and Angela Davis brought their lived experiences into academic discussion, shaping what would become known as "intersectionality" within race, class, and gender studies in U.S. academia. Scholar bell hooks, in her groundbreaking work Ain't I a Woman? Black Women and Feminism (1981), described the exclusion of Black women's experiences from mainstream feminist narratives and underscored the importance of addressing race, gender, and class as intersecting systems of oppression. For hooks, the emergence of intersectionality "challenged the notion that 'gender' was the primary factor determining a woman's fate". Inspired by Lorde, Afro-German women also began to explore issues of overlapping oppression in Germany.

Also in 1981, Cherríe Moraga and Gloria Anzaldúa published This Bridge Called My Back: Writings by Radical Women of Color, an anthology centering the experiences of women of color, which challenges white feminists who made claims to solidarity based on sisterhood, calling for greater recognition of their multiple identities. Among other things, works in the anthology call for greater attention to race-related subjectivities in feminism, and ultimately laid the foundation for third wave feminism.

In 1988, Deborah K. King published the article "Multiple Jeopardy, Multiple Consciousness: The Context of a Black Feminist Ideology". In it, King addresses what soon became the foundation for intersectionality, saying, "Black women have long recognized the special circumstances of our lives in the United States: the commonalities that we share with all women, as well as the bonds that connect us to the men of our race".

=== Demarginalizing the Intersection of Race and Sex ===
In 1989, Kimberlé Crenshaw coined the term intersectionality as a way to help explain the oppression of African-American women in her essay Demarginalizing the Intersection of Race and Sex: A Black Feminist Critique of Anti-discrimination Doctrine, Feminist Theory and Antiracist Politics. Crenshaw's term has risen to the forefront of national conversations about racial justice, identity politics, and policing—and over the years has helped shape legal discussions. In her work, Crenshaw discusses Black feminism, arguing that the experience of being a Black woman cannot be understood in terms independent of either being Black or a woman. Rather, it must include interactions between the two identities, which, she adds, should frequently reinforce one another.

In order to demonstrate that women of color have different experiences from white women, Crenshaw explores domestic violence and rape committed by men, which for women of color consist of a combination of both racism and sexism. She says that because the discourses designed to address either race or sex do not consider both at the same time, women of color are marginalized within both of them as a result. The chapter "Sexualities, social justice, and sexual justice" by Jeff Hearn, Sofia Aboim and Tamara Shefer also directly connects to Crenshaw's concept of intersectionality. It is explained how Crenshaw argues that systems of power constantly ignore the way race and gender intersect. This produces unique forms of marginalization for women of colour. Similarly, the passage also critiques global sexual justice efforts for reproducing racialize and gendered hierarchies, specifically when Global Northern actors frame poor, Black women living in the Global South as "helpless victims". Both cases touch upon how marginalized groups are spoken about, rather than with.

Crenshaw also delves into several legal cases that exhibit the concept of political intersectionality and how anti-discrimination law has been historically limited, such as DeGraffenreid v. General Motors, Moore v Hughes Helicopter Inc., and Payne v Travenol. There are two commonalities, amongst others, between these cases: firstly, each respective court's inability to fully understand the multidimensionality of the plaintiff's intersecting identities, and the limited ability that the plaintiffs had to argue their case due to restrictions created by the very legislation that exists in opposition to discrimination, such as Title VII of the Civil Rights Act of 1964.

== Development ==
The concept of intersectionality was intended to illuminate dynamics that have often been overlooked by feminist theory and movements. Racial inequality was largely ignored by first-wave feminism, which was primarily concerned with achieving political equality between white men and white women, and second-wave feminism, which sought to dismantle sexism relating to the perceived domestic purpose of women. Third-wave feminism—which emerged shortly after the term intersectionality was coined—attempted to address the lack of attention given to race, class, sexual orientation, and gender identity in early feminist movements.

The term became more widely used in the 1990s, particularly following further development of Crenshaw's work by sociologist Patricia Hill Collins. Collins says Crenshaw's term replaced her own previous coinage "Black feminist thought", and "increased the general applicability of her theory from African American women to all women". Collins sought to create frameworks to think about intersectionality, rather than expanding on the theory itself. She identified three main branches of study within intersectionality: one dealing with the background, ideas, issues, conflicts, and debates within intersectionality; another that seeks to apply intersectionality as an analytical strategy to examine how various social institutions might perpetuate social inequality; and one that uses intersectionality to bring social change through social justice initiatives.

Though intersectionality began with the exploration of the interplay between sexist and racist oppression, with classist and homophobic/biphobic oppression sometimes included, the theory has since expanded to cover other forms of oppression. Additionally, intersectionality has been used to address the differences between women of color even regarding shared experiences such as racism. For example, Asian American women have reported intersectional experiences that set them apart from other women of color as well as Asian men. Gloria Wekker says the Chicana feminist work of Gloria E. Anzaldúa is important because "existent categories for identity are strikingly not dealt with in separate or mutually exclusive terms, but are always referred to in relation to one another".

=== Caste ===
In South Asia, Dalit feminists have drawn on intersectional analysis to emphasize the compounded marginalization faced by Dalit women, who experience both caste-based and gender-based discrimination. Scholars such as Thenmozhi Soundararajan argue in their works like The Trauma of Caste that mainstream feminist frameworks often neglect these intersecting oppressions, calling for a more nuanced analysis that recognizes caste as a central axis of inequality.

=== Class ===
Collins has used a Marxist feminist approach to apply intersectional principles to study Black women's poverty and what she calls the "work/family nexus". In her 2000 article "Black Political Economy", she suggests the intersections of consumer racism, gender hierarchies, and disadvantages in the labor market can be centered on Black women's unique experiences—such as the suppression of Black women's economic mobility due to inheritance and anti-miscegenation laws. Chiara Bottici has also incorporated elements of anarcha-feminism to counter criticisms that intersectionality is incomplete or fails to recognize the specificity of women's oppression, saying "that there is something specific about the oppression of women and that in order to fight it you have to fight all other forms of oppression."

=== Colonialism ===
In Latin America, Maria Lugones introduced the concept of the "coloniality of gender" to explore how colonial histories intersect across race, gender, and class, creating unique forms of oppression for Indigenous and Afro-descendant women. Her work reveals the imposition of Eurocentric gender norms during colonial rule, which marginalized non-Western gender identities and social structures. Mara Viveros Vigoya also provides a Latin American perspective which considers the need to address colonialism as part of an intersectional approach.

== Forms ==
In "Mapping the Margins: Intersectionality, Identity Politics, and Violence Against Women of Color", Kimberlé Crenshaw outlines three forms of intersectionality to describe the violence women experience: structural, political, and representational. These frameworks are still used today.

=== Structural intersectionality ===
Structural intersectionality considers how people are marginalized by the combined effects of different overlapping and reinforcing forms of systemic, institutional, and structural inequality. Crenshaw uses this approach to analyze the structural classism, racism, and sexism that combine to make women of color more vulnerable to domestic violence and rape, as well as how a failure to recognise the overlapping of these structures has resulted in inadequate interventions for such women.

In 2020, Alesha Durfee used the structural intersectional approach to examine the inability of "multiply marginalized" people, such as women of color, to file for, obtain, serve, and enforce protective orders in domestic violence situations, and suggested that the systems in place replicated wider social inequalities. Durfee said the basis for such inequalities was "policies and procedures based on inappropriate assumptions about individuals" that do not account for the complexity of their lived experiences. In 2021, a group of researchers using a structural intersectional approach found that the impact of overlapping structural racism, sexism, and income inequality in U.S. healthcare varied considerably across the country but was most consistently associated with poor health in Black women.

=== Political intersectionality ===
Political intersectionality considers how activist or political movements can marginalize people with multiple intersecting identities by focusing on "allegedly universal, single-axis approaches" which either exclude them or else ignore or downplay the complexities of their experiences. Black feminists such as Crenshaw and Deborah K. King have used political intersectionality to explore the separation of race- and gender-based discourse within the anti-racist and feminist movements, which requires women of color to prioritise their interests as either "people of color" or "women", rather than reflecting that they are both. This framework has since been applied to consider other intersections, such as class, sexuality, and disability.

Sameena Azhar et al. have argued that Asian Americans are subject to myths that they "do not experience racialized, sexualized, and gendered microaggressions". They suggest these attitudes serve to socially and politically delegitimize Asian Americans' experiences of racism. They suggest that stereotypes of Asian Americans that frame their sexuality "in ways that maintain the social and political dominance of white men" affect Asian American men and women differently. For example, Asian American women were often perceived as romantically desirable and overly sexualized, while their male counterparts were perceived as asexual.

=== Representational intersectionality ===
Representational intersectionality is the study of how intersecting identities (e.g., race, gender, class, sexuality) are depicted in cultural narratives and media, and how this creates or reinforces overlapping forms of marginalization. Crenshaw used this framework to analyze how stereotypical portrayals of women of color in popular culture often perpetuate harm against them. Subsequent analysis of representation in popular culture has also used an international approach.

Analyzing film and television, bell hooks suggests women of color are frequently portrayed as hyper-sexualized, "sassy", or docile tropes—such as the "fiery Latina', "submissive Asian", "angry Black woman"— which erase the full complexity of their intersecting identities, perpetuate oppressive societal attitudes and norms (such as sexism, racism, and classism), and even lead to violence against women of color. According to Mari J. Matsuda and others, these tropes also appear in advertising and marketing campaigns, which often portray women of color in "exotic" or "hyper-feminine" terms and thereby reinforce stereotypes of them as commodities or objects of consumption.

In their analysis of news media, including over two million articles published by Fox News and The New York Times between 2000–2022, Elliot Ash and others found that news stories involving women of color, LGBTQ+ people, and other minority groups often used sensational or stereotypical lenses, ignoring socioeconomic contexts or broader structural inequalities, and effectively "flattening" the narrative of complex identities. They especially noted tropes of criminality, cleanliness, and invasion about immigrants, single parents, and trans people, which they found had shaped broader perceptions of marginalized communities. In the context of domestic violence, Timothy Laurie and Hannah Stark also observe disparities in representations of victims and offenders: "cisgendered, white, middle-class women are most often regarded as victims responding to an oppressive gender order, and women of colour, Indigenous women, and working-class women are more likely to be regarded as potential criminals."

=== Other forms ===
==== Strategic intersectionality ====
Marie-Claire Belleau has called for "strategic intersectionality" in order to foster cooperation between feminisms of different ethnicities. She refers to different nat-cult (national-cultural) groups that produce different types of feminisms. Using the Québécois nat-cult as an example, Belleau says that many nat-cult groups contain infinite sub-identities within themselves, saying that there are endless ways in which different feminisms can cooperate by using strategic intersectionality, and that these partnerships can help bridge gaps between "dominant and marginal" groups. Belleau argues that, through strategic intersectionality, differences between nat-cult feminisms are neither essentialist nor universal, but should be understood as resulting from socio-cultural contexts. Furthermore, the performances of these nat-cult feminisms are also not essentialist. Instead, they are strategies.

==== Transnational intersectionality ====
Postcolonial feminists and transnational feminists have criticized intersectionality as a concept emanating from WEIRD (Western, educated, industrialized, rich, democratic) societies that unduly universalizes women's experiences. Postcolonial feminists have worked to revise Western conceptualizations of intersectionality that assume all women experience the same type of gender and racial oppression. Shelly Grabe coined the term transnational intersectionality to represent a more comprehensive conceptualization of intersectionality. Grabe wrote, "Transnational intersectionality places importance on the intersections among gender, ethnicity, sexuality, economic exploitation, and other social hierarchies in the context of empire building or imperialist policies characterized by historical and emergent global capitalism."

Both Postcolonial and transnational feminists advocate attending to "complex and intersecting oppressions and multiple forms of resistance". Vrushali Patil argues that intersectionality ought to recognize transborder constructions of racial and cultural hierarchies. About the effect of the state on identity formation, Patil says: "If we continue to neglect cross-border dynamics and fail to problematize the nation and its emergence via transnational processes, our analyses will remain tethered to the spatialities and temporalities of colonial modernity."

Expanding on these global and decolonial perspectives, philosopher Charles W. Mills has argued that Western political philosophy has historically excluded race and colonialism from its moral frameworks, calling for a "decolonization" of liberal thought to address global systems of domination. Similarly, contributors to Gary Craig's Handbook on Global Social Justice emphasize that intersectional approaches must account for worldwide structures of inequality such as colonial history, race, and class, in order to achieve substantive and inclusive justice. Elaborating on this line of thought, Marc Aziz Michael has shown, relying on dominant female STEM enrolment and proficiency data in the Arab world, that even when intersectional axes of thought are included in Western thinking, they are typically perceived as a stacking of oppressions, rather than crossroads of freedom and resistance.

Chandra Mohanty discusses alliances between women worldwide as an example of intersectionality in a global context. She rejects the Western feminist theory, especially when it writes about global women of color, and is generally associated with "third world women". She argues that "third world women" are often thought of as a homogeneous entity, when, in fact, their experience of oppression is informed by their geography, history, and culture. When Western feminists write about women in the global South in this way, they dismiss the inherent, intersecting identities that shape feminism in the global South. Mohanty questions the performance of intersectionality and relationality of power structures within the US and colonialism, and how to work across identities with this history of colonial power structures.

This is elaborated on by Christine Bose, who discusses a global use of intersectionality that works to remove associations of specific inequalities with specific institutions while showing that these systems generate intersectional effects. She uses this approach to develop a framework that can analyze gender inequalities across different nations and differentiates this from an approach (the one that Mohanty was referring to) which, one, paints national-level inequalities as the same and, two, differentiates only between the global North and South. This is manifested through the intersection of global dynamics, such as economics, migration, or violence, with regional dynamics, such as histories of the nation or gendered inequalities in education and property.

The application of transnational intersectionality to the Israeli-Palestinian conflict has been promoted and criticized. Feminist groups have supported "Boycott, Divest, Sanction" (BDS) resolutions based on intersectionality perspectives. In 2015, the National Women's Studies Association promoted a resolution saying "discussions about a transnational, anti-imperialist, intersectional, feminist response" are relevant to BDS, centering "intersectional analysis on the links between interlocking systems of domination and foreground the transnational movements that are determined to dismantle them."

However, others challenge the transnational use of intersectionality, arguing that it is a political framework rather than a neutral analytical tool. In 2016, Inside Higher Ed columnist Cary Nelson wrote that injustices "occur in different parts of the world in different contexts under different political systems," while any "intersection often occurs only in the mind of the beholder or in a political manifesto." In 2019, sociologist Karin Stögner wrote that intersectionality is "more than an analytical concept that helps capture social reality in its complexity; it is also a political program," suggesting it contributes to a "delegitimization of Israel" as "one of the last bastions of imperialism and colonialism."

== Europe ==
Evidence suggests that within Europe there is a divide between white and blue collar workers, and their levels of political engagement, white collar men demonstrated the highest levels of political engagement while on the opposite side of the spectrum falls blue collar women. Women in Europe are observed to generally have less political confidence, especially those who were not able to achieve higher levels of education and/or work blue collar jobs.

One aspect relevant to European intersectionality has to do with the migration status of an individual. European migrants come from across the globe from various different circumstances that may or may not have forced them to flee their homes due to arranged marriages or internal conflict. These situations by nature make these individuals vulnerable because they are in an unfamiliar place and do not generally have a lot of resources to support themselves. Exact numbers differ year by year, as there is a significant number of unaccompanied children migrants. This is on top of reports of racism, islamophobia and general anti-migrant sentiment at almost every level of European society.

Studies in Europe that have used intersectionality as a guiding framework have contributed to a better understanding of gender based violence, showing that it does not occur in isolation and that its underlying patterns can be anticipated and addressed. Gender based violence does not affect all groups equally. Certain populations are more susceptible due not only to their individual circumstances but also to broader societal and institutional factors.

== Applications ==
Intersectionality has been applied in many fields from politics, education healthcare, and employment, to economics. Scholars of intersectionality have also advocated for its use more widely. Little good-quality quantitative research has been done to support or undermine the practical uses of intersectionality, owing to misapplication of theoretical concepts and problems in methodology. Intersectionality is frequently used in feminist and sociological research to analyze how overlapping identities such as race, gender, class, and sexuality shape experiences of discrimination and privilege in society.

=== Domestic violence ===
Women with disabilities encounter more frequent domestic violence with a greater number of abusers. Health care workers and personal care attendants perpetrate abuse in these circumstances, and women with disabilities have fewer options for escaping the abusive situation. There is a "silence" principle concerning the intersectionality of women and disability, which maintains an overall social denial of the prevalence of abuse among the disabled and leads to this abuse being frequently ignored when encountered. This can exacerbate limited autonomy and social isolation of disabled individuals, and place women with disabilities in situations where further or more frequent abuse can occur.

=== Education ===
Intersectionality in education involves considering multiple elements of people's identities to increase accessibility, such as language, learning style, and disabilities. Laura Gonzales and Janine Butler say that an intersectional approach can help decrease the impact of disadvantages in the learning environment. For example, the research by Gonzales and Butler found benefits from incorporating bilingual delivery, adjustments for disability, and inclusion of marginalized subjects in their writing assignments. Authors Collin Lamout Craig and Staci Maree suggest there are also benefits for intersectionality in aiding acknowledgment and understanding in academia.

Within the institution of education, Sandra Jones' research on working-class women in academia takes into consideration meritocracy within all social strata, but argues that it is complicated by race and the external forces that oppress.

=== Employment ===
Intersectional approaches to employment may be implemented in different ways in different organizations. Within the UK charity sector, Ashlee Christoffersen identified five different conceptualizations of intersectionality. "Generic intersectionality" was observed in policy areas, where intersectionality was conceptualized as developing policies to be in everyone's universal interest rather than being targeted to particular groups. "Pan equality" was a concern for issues that affected most marginalised groups. "Multi-strand intersectionality" attempted to consider different groups when making a decision, but rarely viewed the groups as overlapping or focused on issues for a particular group. "Diversity within" is considered one main form of identity, such as gender, as most important, while occasionally considering other aspects of identity, with these different forms of identity sometimes seen as detracting from the main identity. "Intersections of equality strands" considered the intersection of identities, but no form of identity was seen as more relevant. In this approach, it was sometimes felt that if one dealt with the most marginalized identity, the system would tend to work for all people. Christoffersen referred to some of these meanings given to intersectionality as "additive" where inequalities are thought of as being added to and subtracted from one another.

In the United States, studies of the labor market suggest there are economic inequalities due to the intersections of race and gender, including for African American women. In a book by Esther Chow and others, the authors write: "The impact of patriarchy and traditional assumptions about gender and families are evident in the lives of Chinese migrant workers, sex workers and their clients in South Korea, and Indian widows, but also Ukrainian migrants and Australian men of the new global middle class."

=== Healthcare ===
Intersectionality has been used as a critical framework in healthcare, such as in addressing issues of reproductive justice, where the intersection of race, class, and gender shapes access to healthcare and family planning resources for women of color. An intersectional lens reveals a disproportionate rate of maternal mortality among Black women in the United States. Black women experience a significantly higher rate of pregnancy-related deaths, despite controlling for insurance status, income, and education. Research has linked these disparities to structural racism and implicit bias within the healthcare system. Healthcare providers have been shown to cause an underestimation of Black patients' pain and inadequate or delayed treatment, specifically in maternal care and pain management.

People of color, in general, often experience differential treatment in the healthcare system. For example, in the period immediately after 9/11, researchers noted low birth weights and other poor birth outcomes among Muslim and Arab Americans, a result they connected to the increased racial and religious discrimination of the time. Some researchers have also argued that immigration policies can affect health outcomes through mechanisms such as stress, restrictions on access to health care, and the social determinants of health.

Social determinants of health, such as food security, access to clean air and water, housing stability, and employment conditions, can also have significant impacts on health outcomes, particularly for marginalized communities. Environmental racism, a form of systemic racism where communities of color disproportionately bear the burden of environmental hazards, contributes to elevated rates of asthma, cancer, and other chronic illnesses. Rising temperatures and natural disasters as a result of climate change also disproportionately impact populations with limited economic resources and restricted access to healthcare.

Historical medical exploitation continues to inform health disparities today. The Tuskegee Syphilis Study, in which Black men were denied treatment for syphilis without their consent or knowledge, and the forced sterilization of Indigenous and Latina women, driven by the eugenics movement, racial and colonial control, and targeting through welfare and public health programs, are all examples of systemic medical abuse. These events have contributed to longstanding distrust in healthcare institutions among marginalized communities. Additionally, medical research has historically excluded people of color, women, and disabled individuals from clinical trials, resulting in gaps in knowledge about how various treatments affect these populations. This underrepresentation persists in many areas of research and contributes to unequal health outcomes today.

=== Immigration ===
The African American Policy Forum (AAPF) has advocated for an intersectional approach to immigration policy, considering factors such as race, marriage, and gender. The AAPF says that immigrant women's lives are often threatened by abusive spouses who are already citizens, and yet such women cannot divorce their spouses for two years if they seek permanent resident status. According to the AAPF, the law currently includes "no exceptions for battered women who often faced the risk of serious injury and death on the one hand, or deportation on the other".

=== Psychology ===
Researchers in psychology have incorporated intersection effects since the 1950s. These intersection effects were based on studying the lenses of biases, heuristics, stereotypes, and judgments. Psychologists have extended research in psychological biases to the areas of cognitive and motivational psychology. What is found is that every human mind has its own biases in judgment and decision-making that tend to preserve the status quo by avoiding change and attention to ideas that exist outside one's personal realm of perception. Psychological interaction effects span a range of variables, although person-by-situation effects are the most examined category. As a result, psychologists do not construe the interaction effect of demographics such as gender and race as either more noteworthy or less noteworthy than any other interaction effect. In addition, oppression can be regarded as a subjective construct when viewed as an absolute hierarchy.

Even if an objective definition of oppression were reached, person-by-situation effects would make it difficult to deem certain persons or categories of persons as uniformly oppressed. For instance, Black men are stereotypically perceived as criminals, which makes it much more difficult for them to get hired for a job than a white man. However, gay Black men are perceived as harmless, which increases their chances of getting employed and receiving bonuses, even though gay males are also socially disadvantaged. The stereotype of gay men as harmless helps Black men transcend their reputation for criminality. Several psychological studies have likewise shown that possessing multiple oppressed or marginalized identities has effects that are not necessarily additive, or even multiplicative, but rather, interactive in complex ways.

One of the main issues that affects the research of intersectionality is the construct problem. Constructs are what scientists use to build blocks of understanding within their field of study. It is important because it gives us something to measure. As mentioned previously, it is incredibly difficult to define oppression and, specifically, the feeling of being oppressed and the ways that different kinds of oppression may interact as a construct. As psychology grows and changes its ability to define constructs, this research will likely improve.

=== Remediation ===
To provide sufficient preventive, redressive, and deterrent remedies, judges in courts and others working in conflict resolution mechanisms take into account intersectional dimensions.

=== Social work ===
In the field of social work, proponents of intersectionality hold that unless service providers take intersectionality into account, they will be of less use for various segments of the population, such as those reporting domestic violence or disabled victims of abuse. According to intersectional theory, the practice of domestic violence counselors in the United States urging all women to report their abusers to police is of little use to women of color due to the history of racially motivated police brutality, and those counselors should adapt their counseling for women of color.

=== Other fields ===
Intersectionality has also been used in critical animal studies and ecofeminist literature, particularly in considering how our treatment of animals and the natural environment affects people. For example, factory farming can be understood not just as an issue of animal welfare but also as an issue of environmental justice, workers' rights, and public health which may disproportionately impact marginalized communities and peoples.

== Responses ==
=== Academic ===
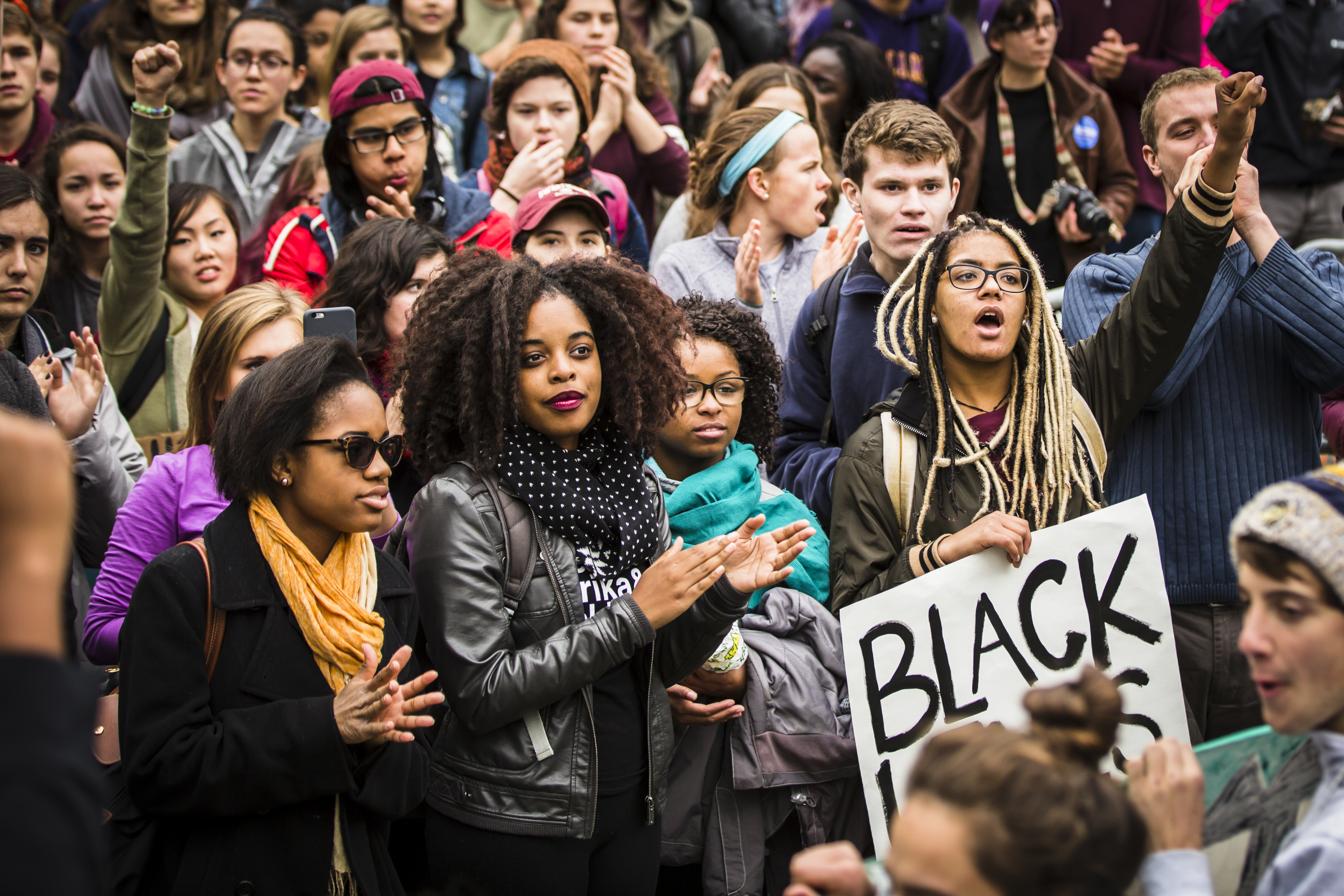
A crowd of people in a Black Lives Matter protest in 2015. The main focus is four Black women, one holding a sign.

Many feminists have positively engaged with the idea of intersectionality. Black feminists, in particular, suggest that an understanding of intersectionality is a vital element of gaining political and social equity and improving the societal structures that oppress individuals. Beverly Guy-Sheftall says, "Black women experience a special kind of oppression and suffering in this country which is racist, sexist, and classist because of their dual race and gender identity and their limited access to economic resources". Stephanie A. Shields says that each part of someone's identity "serve as organizing features of social relations, mutually constitute, reinforce, and naturalize one another". Shields says that one aspect cannot exist individually, rather it "takes its meaning as a category in relation to another category."

Some scholars suggest intersectionality is often weaponized against other forms of feminism. Barbara Tomlinson, of the Department of Feminist Studies at University of California, Santa Barbara, has been critical of the applications of intersectional theory to attack other ways of feminist thinking. Downing says intersectionality, seen through the framework of Andrea Dworkin's class-based radical feminism, focuses too much on group identities and interests over individuality, leading to simplistic analysis and inaccurate assumptions about how a person's values and attitudes are determined. Iris Marion Young suggests that differences must be acknowledged in order to find unifying social justice issues that create coalitions that aid in changing society for the better. More specifically, this relates to the ideals of the National Council of Negro Women (NCNW).

Scholar Jennifer Nash says that, using an Afropessimist framework, intersectionality may flatten the unique experiences of Blackness and gender by treating different forms of identity as equivalent. Nash also criticizes the superficial use of intersectionality by some institutions without addressing systemic inequalities.

=== Utility ===
Among scholars, proponents of intersectionality cite its broad applicability and embrace of nuance, while its critics say it is overly complex or too broad. Sociologist Kathy Davis says intersectionality's broad applicability and consideration of multiple factors makes it a useful critical tool: "It encourages complexity, stimulates creativity, and avoids premature closure, tantalizing feminist scholars to raise new questions and explore uncharted territory."

Rekia Jibrin and Sara Salem suggest that because intersectional theory creates a unified but complex idea of anti-oppression politics, this creates difficulties achieving praxis and results in significant ambiguity in how the framework should be applied. As it is based in standpoint theory, Lisa Downing says the focus on subjective experiences can lead to contradictions and the inability to identify common causes of oppression.

Brittney Cooper says that "intersectionality does not deserve our religious devotion" but that "as a conceptual and analytic tool for thinking about operations of power, intersectionality remains one of the most useful and expansive paradigms we have". In responding to critics of intersectionality who find it to be incomplete, or argue that it fails to recognize the specificity of women's oppression, Chiara Bottici says that "there is something specific about the oppression of women and that in order to fight it you have to fight "all other forms of oppression". Cheryl Townsend Gilkes and Joy James say there is value in focusing on the experiences of Black women.

Patricia Hill Collins also argues that without critical social theory, intersectionality falls flat. She argues that the mission of intersectionality currently within academia is too broad as a theoretical project, leading to its meaning being diluted both by the left and the right. As a result, intersectionality needs to take a position as a critical social theory in order to further it as a discipline and as a theory that can be utilized to dismantle systematic oppression.

=== Research ===
Many recent academics, such as Leslie McCall, have argued that the introduction of the intersectionality theory was vital to sociology and that before the development of the theory, there was little research that specifically addressed the experiences of people who are subjected to multiple forms of oppression within society.

There have been recent attempts to apply the intersectionality theory to research that involves disability, gender, and poverty. For example, Jacqueline Moodley and Lauren Graham focused on the intersection of disabled, impoverished, South African men and women to find what effect different combinations of the characteristics and identities had on outcomes of education, income, and employment. Also, researchers have used data from the National Equal Employment Opportunity Commission, EEOC, and Americans with Disabilities Act (ADA) Research Project to explore the interactions among disability, gender, age, race, and employer characteristics and it connection to the outcome of workplace harassment.

Others suggest that generating testable predictions from intersectionality theory can be complex. Liam Kofi Bright, Daniel Malinsky, and Morgan Thompson suggest a framework of graphical causal modeling to provide "empirically testable interpretations of intersectional theory" to address such concerns.

An analysis of academic articles published through December 2019 found that there are no widely adopted quantitative methods to investigate research questions informed by intersectionality and provided recommendations on analytic best practices for future research. An analysis of academic articles published through May 2020 found that intersectionality is frequently misunderstood when bridging theory into quantitative methodology.

The foundations of intersectionality have also been challenged in peer-reviewed scholarship. In a 2026 paper for the Bulgarian Academy of Sciences, Nora Dimitrova Clinton identified significant theoretical and methodological flaws, such as "treating normative conclusions as given premises, conflating correlation with causation, and resisting empirical testing." She suggested "more coherent and constructive ways to address social problems."

=== Political ===
Critics of intersectionality also say that it is used as a tool of neoliberalism. Cooper says: "To suggest as Puar does that intersectionality is a tool of a neoliberal agenda rather than a tool that works against it is a line of thinking that should be vigilantly guarded against." Jibrin and Salem suggest that, while intersectionality has radical origins, its ambiguities mean it has been embraced by neoliberal feminists, undermining its radical nature:

Given the empirical examples presented, we are convinced that the rise of class domination in what we know as the neoliberal university creates the conditions for concepts like intersectionality to become diluted and commodified. By depoliticizing intersectionality neoliberal market regimes empty radical struggle of structural critiques and translate them into palatable (unthreatening) narratives of social justice, multiculturalisms.

Conservatives such as American conservative commentator Ben Shapiro suggest that intersectionality creates a "hierarchy of victimhood", where individuals are categorized as "members of a victim class by virtue of membership in a particular group".

On the international political scale, intersectional lenses have not been applied to the topic of human right laws. Gauthier de Beco found using an intersectional lens that people with disabilities that belong to racial or ethnic, gender, and age minorities lack suitable human rights.

=== Others ===
Philosopher Tommy J. Curry published several works suggesting intersectional feminism implicitly adopts, and thereby perpetuates, harmful stereotypes of Black men. Curry says Crenshaw's intersectional model depends on second-wave feminist ideas, imported from subculture of violence theorists who argue that Black masculinity is compensatory and sexually predatory. In so doing, Curry says that the intersectional feminist concept of "Double Jeopardy" is fundamentally mistaken because intersectionality is over-determined by feminist politics. Curry also says that Crenshaw's conclusions in Mapping the Margins rely on gender essentialism that erases Black male victims of intimate partner violence, sexual assault, and lethal violence.

In April 2025, the Royal Society of Edinburgh's Talat Yaqoob wrote a London School of Economics blog post arguing that intersectionality is reduced to "being a descriptor of identities," saying it is better used as a "method of analysis" to highlight "systemic oppressions."

== See also ==
- Class discrimination
- Class reductionism
- Cross-cutting cleavage – Accord between otherwise divided groups
- Disability justice
- Implicit stereotype
- Kyriarchy
- Matrix of domination
- Misogynoir
- Oppression Olympics
- Polylogism
- Progressive stack
- Syndemic
- Womanism
