= Pushout =

Student encouraged to leave school by the school itself

A pushout is a student who leaves their school before graduation, through the encouragement of the school. A student who leaves of their own accord (e.g., to work or care for a child), rather than through the action of the school, is considered a school dropout. In typical use, the category of pushouts excludes students who have been formally expelled from school for violating rules (e.g., for being violent).

Students may be pushed out of school because their presence in the school creates difficulty in meeting some goal of the school. For example, in the case where funding for the school is dependent upon scholastic achievement of the students, if the school can get rid of low-performing students, average test scores on academic performance tests will go up, thus increasing funding. Schools may pushout truant students, who formally enroll in classes, but then refuse to attend.

In some low-performing schools in Chicago combined dropout/pushout rates have exceeded 25% in one year.

Adolescents are also pushed from schools because they present discipline problems. Within youth advocacy and activist communities, pushout is a term that recognizes the intersecting forces of oppression most commonly responsible for high school "drop outs" within marginalized communities of color, allowing for the responsibility to be placed on those forces, rather than the youth impacted by unequal education, economics, disciplinary actions, and racism.

== See also ==
- Remedial education
- School-to-prison pipeline
