= DeGraffenreid v. General Motors =

1976 court case

- Court: United States District Court, E. D. Missouri, E. D.
- Decided: May 4, 1976
- Docket nos.: 75-487 C (3)
- Citation: 413 F. Supp. 142, 11 Empl. Prac. Dec. (CCH) 10,922

Case history
- Appealed to: United States Court of Appeals, Eighth Circuit.

Court membership
- Judge sitting: Harris Kenneth Wangelin

Case opinions
- Since black men and white women were both employed, there was no discrimination on basis of sex and gender for a special classification of black women.

Keywords
- intersectionality, black feminism, black women, intersectional feminism, Kimberle Crenshaw

DeGraffenreid v. General Motors
- Court: Court of Appeals for the Eighth Circuit
- Decided: July 15, 1977
- Docket nos.: 76-1599
- Citation: 558 F.2d 480, 15 Fair Empl. Prac. Cas. (BNA) 573, 14 Empl. Prac. Dec. (CCH) 7692, 1977 U.S. App. LEXIS 12451

Case history
- Appealed to: United States Court of Appeals, Eighth Circuit.

Court membership
- Judges sitting: Myron H. Bright, Donald Roe Ross, Warren Keith Urbom

Case opinions
- Since black men and white women were both employed, there was no discrimination on basis of sex and gender for a special classification of black women.

Keywords
- intersectionality, black feminism, black women, intersectional feminism, Kimberle Crenshaw

DeGraffenreid v. General Motors, 413 F. Supp. 142 (E.D. Mo. 1976), was a legal case in which a United States district court held that black women could not sue for discrimination as a group when they were unable to demonstrate that the defendant discriminated against black people generally, or against women generally, and that the statutory protections against discrimination based on race and sex could not be combined to create a new protection for persons belonging to a group combining both characteristics.

The initial issue in this lawsuit is whether or not the plaintiffs are seeking relief from racial discrimination, or sex-based discrimination. The plaintiffs allege that they are suing on behalf of black women, and that therefore this lawsuit attempts to combine two causes of action into a new special sub-category, namely, a combination of racial and sex-based discrimination. The Court notes that plaintiffs have failed to cite any decisions which have stated that black women are a special class to be protected from discrimination. The Court's own research has failed to disclose such a decision. The plaintiffs are clearly entitled to a remedy if they have been discriminated against. However, they should not be allowed to combine statutory remedies to create a new "super-remedy" which would give them relief beyond what the drafters of the relevant statutes intended. Thus, this lawsuit must be examined to see if it states a cause of action for race discrimination, sex discrimination, or alternatively either, but not a combination of both.

== History ==
Before 1970, General Motors employed only one black woman (as a janitor) in the General Motors Assembly Division in St. Louis. Until May 1, 1970, GM's factory in St. Louis excluded women from any work on the assembly line. GM's justification was that Missouri laws and regulations set a maximum workday for women at nine hours and that sending women home after a nine-hour shift could disrupt production. At the time, some women worked in the cushion room, the part of the plant producing seats and upholstery for vehicles. However, none of the employees in the cushion room were black women. General Motors stopped following Missouri's nine-hour workday for women after May 1, 1970.

During a business recession, General Motors laid off some of its employees on January 15, 1974. General Motors used a "last hired-first fired" layoff scheme to decide who was laid off as required by its collective bargaining agreement with the union. Five black women who had been laid off sued alleging race and sex discrimination, saying the "last hired-first fired" perpetuated GM's past discrimination. All five women – DeGraffenreid, Hines, Chapman, Hollis, and Bell – alleged that "but for" GM's discriminatory practices they would have applied to work at the factory between 1965 and 1967.

== Decision ==
The claims were broken into two separate portions: race discrimination and sex discrimination. The sex discrimination claim was dismissed since the women had been hired prior to the enactment of Title VII. The race discrimination claim was consolidated with another suit brought by Black men alleging GM engaged in race discrimination.

The District Court dismissed all claims. The appeals court found that the claim surrounding the "last hired-first fired" layoff scheme was dismissed correctly, but the race discrimination claim should be re-evaluated.

The appeals court reasoning related to "last hired-first hired" is as follows

However, after the submission of this case, the Supreme Court issued two opinions which make clear that we must sustain the district court's judgment on the appellants' Title VII claims, because those claims, dealing with discrimination in hiring and its effect on seniority and layoff, are either barred by limitations or fail to state a violation of Title VII. See International Brotherhood of Teamsters v. United States.

The Teamsters case emphasizes that § 703(h) of Title VII validates facially neutral seniority systems, even if they perpetuate the impact of race discrimination which occurred before the effective date of Title VII. The Court concluded: In sum, the unmistakable purpose of § 703(h) was to make clear that the routine application of a bona fide seniority system would not be unlawful under Title VII. As the legislative history shows, this was the intended result even where the employer's pre-Act discrimination resulted in whites having greater existing seniority rights than Black people.

Accordingly, we hold that an otherwise neutral, legitimate seniority system does not become unlawful under Title VII simply because it may perpetuate pre-Act discrimination. Congress did not intend to make it illegal for employees with vested seniority rights to continue to exercise those rights, even at the expense of pre-Act discriminatees.

== Impact ==
The case is notably cited by American civil rights advocate and law professor Kimberlé Crenshaw as an example of the importance of considering intersectionality in discrimination claims.
