= Double Jeopardy =

Double jeopardy is a type of procedural defence in legal terminology.

Double jeopardy may also refer to:

== Art and entertainment and media ==
=== Film ===
- Double Jeopardy (1955 film), starring Rod Cameron
- Double Jeopardy (1992 film), a TV movie starring Rachel Ward and Bruce Boxleitner
- Double Jeopardy (1999 film), starring Tommy Lee Jones and Ashley Judd

=== Television ===
- Double Jeopardy!, the second round of the game show Jeopardy!
- "Double Jeopardy" (Beast Wars), a 1996 episode
- "Double Jeopardy" (The Colbys), a 1986 episode
- "Double Jeopardy" (CSI: Miami), a 2006 episode
- "Double Jeopardy" (The Good Wife), a 2010 episode
- "Double Jeopardy" (Haven), a 2012 episode
- "Double Jeopardy" (Highlander: The Series), a 1996 episode
- "Double Jeopardy" (Lois & Clark), a 1996 episode
- "Double Jeopardy" (Magnum, P.I.), a 1982 episode
- "Double Jeopardy" (Stargate SG-1), a 2001 episode
- "Double Jeopardy" (Watch My Chops!), a 2003 episode

=== Literature ===
- Double Jeopardy (Hardy Boys)
- Double Jeopardy (Pratt novel), by Fletcher Pratt
- Double Jeopardy (StarFist novel), by Dan Cragg and David Sherman
- Double Jeopardy: To Be Black and Female (pamphlet), a 1969 pamphlet by Frances M. Beal

=== Music ===
- Double Jeopardy (album), Akon album

== In other uses ==
- Double jeopardy (marketing), a statistical phenomenon in marketing
- Double Jeopardy Clause, protections in the United States constitution
- Double jeopardy or triple oppression, a theory about discrimination and oppression

== See also ==
- Multiple jeopardy, a theory about discrimination and oppression
- Double (disambiguation)
- Jeopardy (disambiguation)
