= Triple Jeopardy (disambiguation) =

Triple Jeopardy may refer to:

- Triple jeopardy or triple oppression, a theory about discrimination and oppression
- Triple jeopardy, a legal concept, to be tried thrice for the same crime; see double jeopardy

== Sports and games ==
- Triple Jeopardy!, a round on the TV game show Jeopardy! used as the third round in Celebrity Jeopardy! (2022 TV series)
- "Triple Jeopardy Championship", a pro-wrestling championship in Pro Wrestling eXpress

== Literature ==
- Triple Jeopardy (book), a 1952 Rex Stout anthology of mystery fiction
- Triple Jeopardy (book), a book by Roger Parloff
- Triple Jeopardy: The Autobiography of Angela Lynn Douglas (book), a 1983 autobiography by Angela Lynn Douglas
- Triple Jeopardy: Elderly, Poor, African-American Women and Their Barriers to Health Care and Screening for Breast and Cervical Cancer (thesis), an award winning thesis by Kathie-Ann Joseph
- Triple Jeopardy (book), a 2010 novel by David L. Hoof
- Triple Jeopardy (book), a 2019 novella by Anne Perry

== Other uses ==
- "Triple Jeopardy" (episode), an award winning episode of Deadliest Catch; see List of awards and nominations received by Deadliest Catch
- "Triple Jeopardy" (segment), an episode of The Invincible Iron Man in the 1966 TV series The Marvel Super Heroes

== See also ==
- Multiple jeopardy, a theory about discrimination and oppression
- Jeopardy (disambiguation)
- Triple (disambiguation)
