= Final Jeopardy =

Final Jeopardy may refer to:

- Final Jeopardy!, a round in the TV game show Jeopardy!
- Final Jeopardy (1985 film), the TV film starring Richard Thomas and Mary Crosby
- Final Jeopardy (2001 film), the TV film starring Dana Delany and Billy Burke
- Final Jeopardy, a novel by Linda Fairstein

== See also ==
- Jeopardy (disambiguation)
- Final (disambiguation)
