= Double Jeopardy: To Be Black and Female =

1969 pamphlet by Frances M. Beal

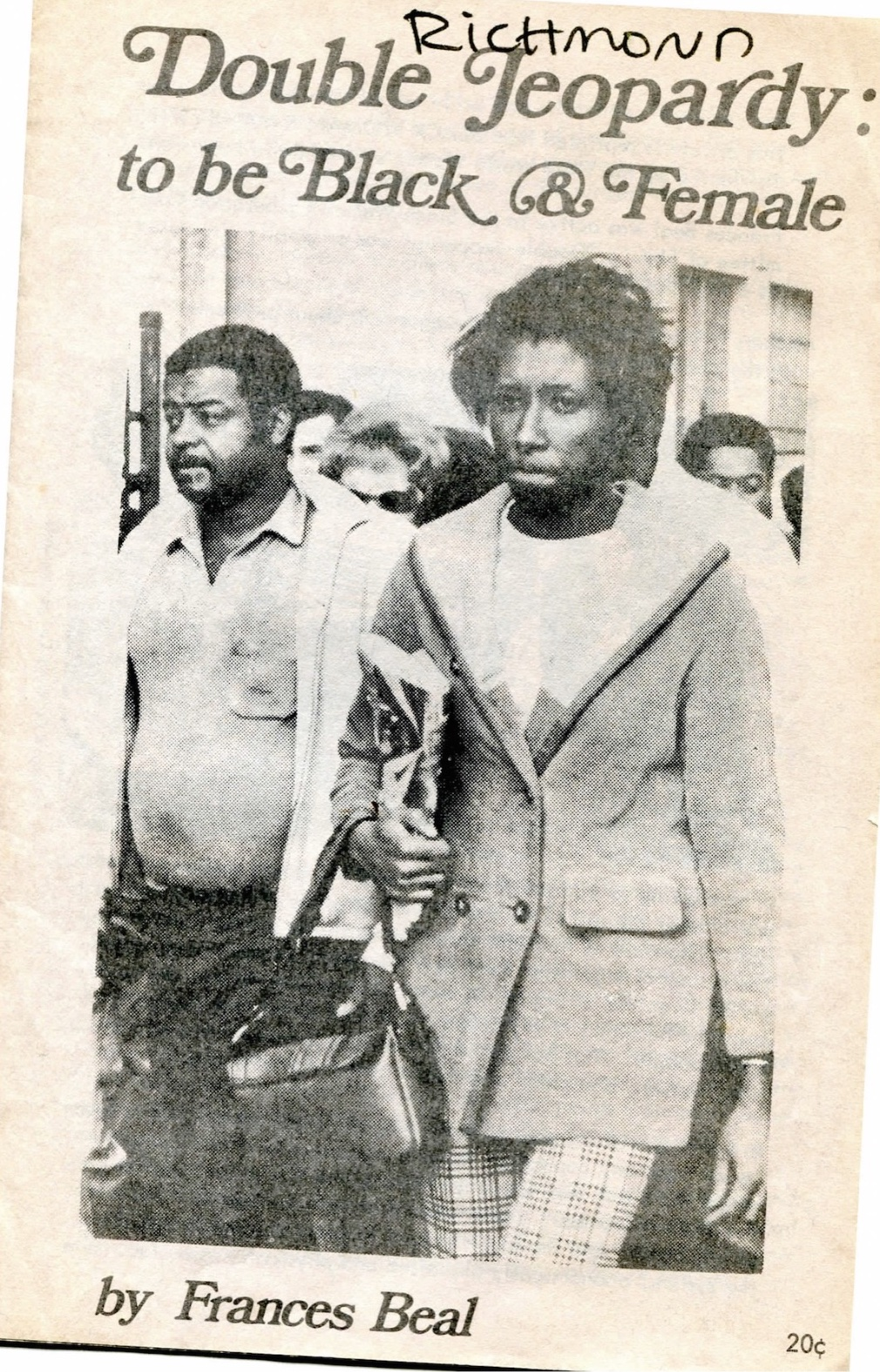
The front page of the pamphlet.

"Double Jeopardy: To Be Black and Female" is a 1969 feminist pamphlet written by Frances M. Beal that critiques capitalism, reproductive rights, as well as social politicalization and its effects on the Black women identity and community. Beal's essay talks about the misconceptions and troubles that occur when trying to analyze the role of a Black woman in society. More specifically, the pamphlet seeks to analyze, explain, and apply the specific discrimination and oppression Black women face in society at the intersection of both their gender and race. The pamphlet covers many different aspects of life and the levels of oppression placed upon Black women in the areas of capitalism, race, and gender. Moreover, her article dives into her analysis of the term "double jeopardy" and the compounded oppression faced by Black women is linked to their race and gender. Additionally, the pamphlet includes principles outlined by the Third World Women's Alliance (TWWA).

In 1970, the pamphlet was revised, then published in The Black Woman, an anthology edited by Toni Cade Bambara in 1970. A revised version was included in the 1970 anthology Sisterhood is Powerful: An Anthology of Writings From The Women's Liberation Movement, edited by Robin Morgan.

== Frances M. Beal ==
Frances M. Beal is a Black feminist and activist. Her work focuses on civil rights, racial justice, peace and women's rights. In 1958, she joined the NAACP, which began her journey in political activism. She then studied at the Sorbonne in France as a young woman. She was heavily influenced by the opposition students faced based on the colonial status of Algeria. She worked with the Student Nonviolent Coordinating Committee (SNCC) in the early 1960s. In 1968, she founded the Black Women's Liberation Committee for the SNCC, which became the Third World Women's Alliance. Beal is also a writer and has provided foundational writing to Black feminist thought. Some of her publications include "Slave of a Slave No More: Black Women in Struggle" and "The Making of a Black President". She is also included in the film "She's Beautiful When She's Angry," which focuses on historic footage of women known to be advocates for the women's liberation movements in the 1960s.

== "Economic Exploitation of Black Women" ==
The first section of the pamphlet talks about the economic effects seen due to the exploitation of Black women. The reasons for these discrepancies can be traced back to the Jim Crow laws implemented to reinforce segregation following the Plessy v Furguson (1896) ruling by the U.S. Supreme Court. These policies made legal the "separate but equal" doctrine that preserved segregation in public facilities, including schooling. The effects of these segregationist policies can be seen in differences in economic outcomes, such as the wage gap between men and women extending as far as the 1970s. At the time, the wage scale for white men is $6,704, compared to the $2,861 Black women made. The capitalist system reduces Black women to level of enslavement while men, exploited by capitalism as well, are given a level of superiority based on patriarchal beliefs making it so that women become the targets of oppression. So, in sum, Black women are socially denigrated to the lowest levels of society, being at the crossroads of oppression based on not only race, but also gender, especially when compared to men in similar social contexts. As a result, Black women are funneled into low-wage, precarious employment. These positions not only pay less, but also have limited opportunities for employment advancement. These systems, in conjunction with one another, serve to oppress Black women and, more importantly, keep them in that vulnerable position. For example, Black women are given specific jobs as domestic and hospital workers, where employers can pay them less amounts of money than others in the same field. Beal thus exposes the concrete economic raison d'être of both racism and sexism. In other words, this economic marginalization enforces a situation in which Black women are essential for maintaining lower-wage labor tasks as they are constantly assigned jobs that are undervalued and underpaid. This puts them at an unfair disservice within the workplace, such as failure to receive pay raises or promotions, inhibiting their success. She highlights the lack of effort put towards fighting the racist and sexist exploitation imprinted into the labor movement. The liberation of these groups was described by Beal as liberation to the labor scene of the United States as well.

Beal draws several conclusions from this: 1) that the divisions created between workers because of the different pay rates are hindering the advancement of the workers' struggle as a whole because white workers do not readily question their privileges; 2) that, in the end, one has to see different forms of exploitation as related to one another if we want to get rid of them all; 3) and that an awareness of, and an end to the super-exploitation of Black workers, and women in particular, should be a priority in the fight against capitalism. "It is not an intellectual persecution alone; the movement is not a psychological outburst for us; it is quite real. We as Black women have got to deal with the problems that the Black masses deal with, for our problems in reality are one and the same," Beal said. Division in the workforce creates a labor hierarchy. The labor hierarchy can influence work environments and overall treatment of employees. Since the formation of slavery, Black women have been viewed solely on a level servitude. The collection of these ideas has had a negative impact on the way they are treated in the years following, even in modern times. When describing the labor market as a whole, Nina Banks states Black women have always had the highest level participation, regardless of age, marital status, or number of children. Still, Black women are the most neglected group in public health settings, because of the way society and public health institutions view their race and gender.

The essay discusses economic oppression of Black women from the perspective of racism. However, Beal did not analyze class oppression as an independent form of oppression. Although the economic oppression of Black women was rooted in racism and sexism that historically constrained them to low wage jobs, Black women face multiple oppressions that impede their liberation. These underpaid positions Black women are subjected to are typically service jobs such as maids or cleaners that are hired by white individuals. This reestablishes the master-servant relationship that consistently reappears throughout history. The essay discusses how the capitalist system within the American society defined manhood. An individual is considered a real "man" if he has a good job, makes a lot of money and drives a fancy car. For more context on this concept of manhood, see The Negro Family: The Case For National Action. The essay argues that many Black women accepted this capitalist evaluation of manhood as it was seen as a start for liberation for Black people and that women would be next. This contributed to the strained relationship between the Black man and woman; Black women viewed Black men as lazy and explained this for their lack of employment. There is also a perspective shared among some Black men that women are to remain at home and not get involved, but this view is actually counteractive as it is not just Black men seeking abolishment of oppression. Beal emphasizes the need for both Black women and men to recognize the parallel adversities both parties have experienced and to work together to eliminate oppression.

== "Bedroom Politics" ==
In this section, Beal discusses the promotion of sterilization of non-white women in order to maintain population levels between those who are white and those who aren't. Beal claims that the recent cry for birth control in both Black and non-white neighborhoods was more of a surgical genocide movement trying to prevent those of the non-white background from reproducing and increasing in numbers. She outlines the difference between sterilization tactics for men and women. A vasectomy for men is simple procedure that only takes a couple minutes to complete. On the opposite end, women have to go through a surgical procedure, a salpingectomy, which involves anesthetics. It is classified as a major surgery because it requires the removal of a fallopian tube, as well as an overnight hospital stay. Beal explains how non-white women were used as scapegoats when the birth control pill was initially created. Puerto Rican and Black women were used to evaluate how efficient the pill was. The now widely-known side effects of the pill were not brought up till the white population started to experience the effects of it. Sterilization done in unethical ways during the 1970s was based on Eugenics - a set of beliefs that aim at population control in favor of a certain demographic. Populations considered less desirable, especially people of color and poor people, have been vastly affected by the oppressive actions of birth control.

The creation of the birth control pill also led to "Maternity Clinics" to be placed in Black and Puerto Rican communities. The rise of these sterilization clinics has spread to the United States including areas such as Fauquier County, Virginia under the pretense of "human betterment" to promote the notion that the restriction of reproductive rights in underrepresented groups -especially Black women- is socially beneficial. Beal alludes to how this takes away the will for Black women to have control over their own bodies and conform to societal pressures. These pressures can take many forms such as persuasive methods meant to suggest undergoing sterilization is a "responsible" decision for individuals considered unfit to reproduce. Black women's autonomy is taken away by processes such as these that frame their reproductive decisions in a perspective that benefits the society as a whole rather than individual decisions. This negative relationship between Black women and healthcare causes apprehension when the actual need for surgical procedures arises. The lack of trust eventually becomes an obstacle to proper health due to their fear of being viewed as less than human or their demands being completely disregarded. The forced sterilization of Black women and women of color violated their reproductive rights and this influenced Beal's formation of Third World Women's Alliance for Black women's liberation.

Beal discusses the lack of access to legal abortion for Black women and other women of color, thus threatening their health. Rich white women were able to receive abortions with little to no struggle or interference from authorities. Black women were not granted this luxury because of the economic inequality and racial biases they face, highlighting another example of the term "double jeopardy" once again. Their health was put in jeopardy due to oppressive actions to control the life process of human beings. Beal explains that Black women should be able to practice safe birth control methods, and be able to obtain legal abortions as basic principle of human and reproductive rights. However, Black men were opposed to abortion for Black women because they considered abortion as genocide for Black people. "The elimination of these horrendous conditions will free Black women for full participation in the revolution, and there after, in the building of a new society," she states. To make matters worse, the media had little to no coverage over the injustices pertaining to Black women, furthering the oppression they were facing.

Historical injustices such as the implementation of forced sterilizations are intricately woven into narratives surrounding Black reproductive rights. The intersection of race, gender, class all shape the experience of Black women which unfortunately results in an endless loop of mistrust that continues distance them from proper access to healthcare. In order to prioritize autonomy of Black women, supportive system changes must be made to restore trust and guarantee that there are no programs that are hindering the ability for Black women to make choices regarding their reproductive health.

== "Relation to the White Movement" ==
Another section of the essay focuses on the troubled relationship between Black women and white women's movement. Black liberation groups for women were started in order to combine gender, race, and class politics. Beal uses this section to explain that the white women's liberation movement in the United States did not have the same objective in mind as Black women. This discrepancy resulted from the white women's movement's overwhelming majority of middle-class viewpoints, which usually gave priority to causes -such as reproductive rights and equal workplace treatment- that appealed mainly to white, wealthy women rather than facing the racism that affects their Black counterparts. She explains that any group that does not have anti-racist and anti-imperialistic ideas will never understand the struggles Black women are up against. Those involved in white women liberation groups were mostly a part of the middle class. Therefore, they do not experience the economic exploitation faced by Black women which highlights the large disconnect between the groups in the feminist movement. It was shown that the movement is not fully inclusive as not all challenges of non-white women are considered fighting for. This ties back into the ideals of "double jeopardy" as the compounding effects of Black women's race and class inhibit their accessibility to equal amounts of care -in healthcare, education, and job opportunities- as other groups such as white women.

Beal explains that if white groups are not fighting against capitalism and racism, they do not have anything in common with the Black liberation groups at all. Moreover, white women's movement was insensitive to Black women's issues such as abortion rights, forced sterilization and welfare rights. As Audrey Lorde stated, "The master's tools will never dismantle the master's house." What this means is that without addressing the unique oppression that Black women specifically face in society, the feminist movement will not achieve its true goals of liberation. White women focused solely on gender issues, negating the race and class aspects that effect Black women in the most oppressive ways. One specific example of this neglect by white women in their analyzing of gender and race dynamics stems from the fight for abortion rights and forced sterilization. In the 1970s, as discussed above, when fighting for reproductive rights and access to abortion, white feminists ignored the specific systemic abuses against Black women, instead focusing exclusively on the gender aspect of oppression. This course of action highlights both the privilege white women enjoy and the importance of taking an intersectional approach to feminist advocacy in order to specifically address the dual-oppression Black women face. Ignoring the race and class aspects of oppression and how they affect Black women further adds to the obtuse nature regarding their struggles. The inequalities described are found deep within a past racism history leading to a lack of awareness from groups who have the privilege of remaining oblivious to these issues. White women's class and race aids in their privilege ultimately. It is difficult justifying that Black women face identical struggles to those of White women, but society clumps women's struggles under one umbrella term when they are actually highly different.

The troubled relationship between Black women and white women's movement was also seen in feminist organizations such as the Student Non-violent Coordinating Committee (SNCC) as around 1965, white women were moving from SNCC to a more upper-middle-class Students for Democratic Society.

== "The New World" ==
The final part of the essay focuses on the new world in which Beal discusses male supremacy within the Black liberation movement. Beal discusses that Black people, especially Black men, have to take a closer look at what type of world they want to live in, and actively fight for it to be created. Once Black women are free from the bonds of oppression, freedom can be achieved for everyone. "Unless women in any enslaved nation are completely liberated, the change cannot be really called a liberation," she said. This type of liberation requires active participation from the Black community as whole, meaning Black men and women have to come together in order to gain liberation. The pamphlet discusses the need for the Black liberation movement to address the issues Black women face. "This will mean changing the traditional routines that we have established as a result of living in total corrupting society. It means changing how you relate to your wife, your husband, your parents and your coworkers," she explained. The essay discusses the need to eliminate all forms of oppressions within society and the importance of Black women to be at the forefront of the Black liberation movement.

This pamphlet played an important role in the Black rights movement for women and Black feminist scholarship. Beal's essay also influenced Black feminist organizations such as the SNCC and TWWA. Beal influenced TWWA naming its newspaper Triple Jeopardy, and adopted an analysis of Black women's oppression through lenses of race, class and gender.Not only did Beal influence these organizations, she also acted as the forefront for a plethora of future women's rights activists such as Audre Lorde, Barbara Smith, and Bell Hooks. These three figures are just some of the individuals that continued to fight for unique challenges faced by Black women.

== Reactions ==
Though influential, Beal's pamphlet has been critiqued by scholars and activists, specifically on the grounds that more nuanced analyses exist. For instance, Kimberlé Crenshaw’s concept of intersectionality, developed in her 1989 article Demarginalizing the Intersection of Race and Sex argues that focusing exclusively on race and sex is a framework with a limited scope on analyzing the oppression individuals in society face. Crenshaw argues that other forms of discrimination such as class and sexual orientation further compound Black women's oppression, and this is unaccounted for in Beal's double jeopardy framework. Crenshaw's intersectionality builds on Beal's double jeopardy by incorporating additional overlapping forms of oppression.

Another criticism of Beal centers around the overgeneralization of the narrative surrounding Black women's experiences. By arguing that all Black women have similar experiences, Beal fails to account for specific experiences and diversity in perspectives among oppressed races. Factors like class and religion often have factors that Beal does not account for in her model. Additionally, Beal's framework does not incorporate global sentiment and perspectives on race and gender. Global variables including capitalism, colonialism, and globalism are important aspects of oppression which Beal's model does not address fully.

Moreover, a major criticism of Beal's argument is that it creates rifts between women of all races. Beal's argument highlights the divide between White and Black women, when in reality both groups are fighting for the same cause: equal rights and representation. Instead, critics argue that Beal's argument should be focused on a more unifying approach trying to bring women together.

Sociologist Deborah K. King expands on these critiques through her concept of "multiple jeopardy," asserting that intersecting factors like race, gender, and class do not simply “add up” but rather interact in ways that “multiply” their effects on Black women's experiences. King argues that “being Black and female is not merely a matter of race plus gender,” emphasizing instead that these identities dynamically reinforce one another, creating unique challenges that go beyond the scope of double jeopardy. This multiplicative approach, according to King, provides a more comprehensive framework for understanding “the intensification of oppression” that Black women experience, as opposed to viewing racial and gender oppression as separate forces that merely combine.
