= Single jeopardy =

Single jeopardy or variation, may refer to:

- the legal view that accused should not face double jeopardy, facing jeopardy twice, but only once, or singly, a single jeopardy; see Double jeopardy
- in jurisprudence, the first time that jeopardy is attached to a criminal proceeding; see Prejudice (legal term)
- the first instance of oppression in the triple oppression theory about discrimination and oppression
- Single Jeopardy!, an unofficial backformation to describe the first round (distinct from Double Jeopardy, the second round) of the Jeopardy! TV quiz gameshow

== See also ==
- A single named Jeopardy
  - "Jeopardy" (single), a 1983 single by the Greg Kihn Band off the album Kihnspiracy
- Single (disambiguation)
- Jeopardy (disambiguation)
