= TWWA =

TWWA is an initialism which can refer to:

- Tagolwanen Women Weavers Association, founded 2012, Banig
- Third World Women's Alliance, Black women's organization active in the United States from 1968 to 1980
- Trans-World Wrestling Association or Alliance, Japanese wrestling promotion which later became International Wrestling Enterprise
