= Multiple jeopardy =

Theory discussing interactions between inequalities

Multiple jeopardy is the theory that the various factors of one's identity that lead to discrimination or oppression, such as gender, class, or race, have a multiplicative effect on the discrimination that person experiences. The term was coined by Dartmouth Professor Deborah K. King in her 1988 essay, "Multiple Jeopardy, Multiple Consciousness: The Context of a Black Feminist Ideology" to account for the limitations of the double or triple jeopardy models of discrimination, which assert that every unique prejudice has an individual effect on one's status, and that the discrimination one experiences is the additive result of all of these prejudices. Under the model of multiple jeopardy, it is instead believed that these prejudices are interdependent and have a multiplicative relationship; for this reason, the multiple jeopardy in its name primarily emphasizes the simultaneous existence of multiple forms of discrimination rather than the type of relationship among them. King demonstrates that those who face multiple jeopardy might develop multiple consciousness, an awareness of systems of inequality working with and through one another, to support the validity of the black feminist and other intersectional causes.

== Difference from double jeopardy ==
The framework of multiple jeopardy was created as a response to the double or triple jeopardy assumption, which, as understood by King, correlates each mode of discrimination with individual and independent effects that, when added together, will create the full picture of the discrimination one faces. Deborah K. King likens this model to a mathematical equation: "racism plus sexism plus classism equals triple jeopardy". If, for example, it were to be understood that, as a result of racism, black people in the workplace face an earnings disadvantage compared to white men, and women in the workplace face an earnings disadvantage due to sexism, then double jeopardy would assume that a black woman would see an earnings disadvantage of no more or less than the sum of that faced by black people and women on their own. This assumption runs contrary to the idea of intersectionality by asserting that individuals do not face unique forms of discrimination as a result of the various aspects of their identity such as gender or race, and that discrimination can instead be predicted as the sum of the effects each of these aspects has on the way they are treated.

By contrast, King's multiple jeopardy overturned the false dichotomy and trichotomy between race, gender, and classism to reveal how a belief in race, gender, and classism as different problems marginalizes Black women in the antiracist social movements. Instead, it is founded on the idea that each mode of discrimination is multiplicative and independent, and thus the relationship between racism, sexism and classism would be represented as "racism multiplied by sexism multiplied by classism independently". King uses this mathematical equation to argue that the institutional context behind the ways that race, sex, and class are treated in society can create unique types of discrimination that differ vastly from the discrimination associated with each of these factors. Under this ideology, the discrimination experienced by a black woman is seen as much more than just the sum of the discrimination that a black man and a white woman would experience.

King illustrates this concept by recounting the ill treatment of black women during the era of slavery in the United States. At that time, black workers were subjected to demanding physical labor and brutal punishments. Black men and black women were both victims of this practice, but black women also endured subjugation exclusive to women; as Angela Davis explained in Women, Race, and Class, "If the most violent punishments of men consisted in floggings and mutilations, women were flogged and mutilated, as well as raped." King explains that while rape was a common punishment for women, the rape and impregnation of black women was used to strengthen and perpetuate the slave trade because it helped produce capital - being, in this case, more slaves. King concludes that the rape of black women in the era of slavery was critically differentiated from the rape of women as a whole because it existed as the product of contemporary, institutional racism, and could not have existed without relation to said racism.

== Difference from intersectionality ==
Multiple jeopardy and intersectionality are two related but distinct frameworks that are often confused. While intersectionality, coined by Professor Kimberlé Crenshaw, describes how different identity factors such as race, gender, and class intersect to create unique forms of discrimination, multiple jeopardy — introduced by King — focuses specifically on the multiplicative effect of overlapping oppressions. Take Kimberlé Crenshaw's well-known metaphor of intersection as an example. The concept of intersectionality emphasizes the distinct place where "roads" of oppression overlap. Under intersectionality, each identity is understood to interact with others to create a distinct experience of discrimination, but it does not necessarily assume a multiplicative effect. However, multiple jeopardy assumes that these factors interact in a way that produces a compounding impact rather than an additive one, making discrimination more severe than the sum of each individual factor. Multiple jeopardy can be thought of as standing at the intersection where a car accident occurred, causing an amplified sense of trauma due to the compounded nature of the collisions.

Although approached from different perspectives — intersectionality emphasizing the interconnected nature of identity categories and multiple jeopardy focusing on the compounding effects of overlapping discriminations — both frameworks disagree with treating the discrimination and oppression experienced by Black women as a single-axis framework or simply “the sum of race and sex discrimination” and are essential for understanding the complex nature of oppression.

== Implications of multiplicative discrimination models ==
The distinction between additive and multiplicative models has significant implications for social and legal understandings of inequality. Additive models can obscure the unique, compounded forms of discrimination faced by those with intersecting marginalized identities, often reducing these experiences to individual components that fail to capture the full context of oppression. For instance, in an additive framework, a Black woman’s experiences of racism and sexism might be treated as separate issues, ignoring how these forms of bias combine to produce a distinct type of discrimination that cannot be dissected into parts.

By contrast, multiplicative model recognize that systems of oppression are not a simply layer but interconnected forces. King’s multiple jeopardy and Kimberlé Crenshaw’s concept of intersectionality reiterates how overlapping social identities can shape lived experiences in ways that are qualitatively different from the experiences of people with only one marginalized identity. This perspective has practical consequences for policy and legal frameworks, as it calls for approaches that can account for interconnecting social inequalities. By acknowledging the compounded effects of intersecting identities, multiplicative models reveal that marginalized groups may need targeted strategies to address the challenges they face.

== Multiple jeopardy and multiple consciousness ==
Deborah King notes that prior scholars, like Frances Beal and Audre Lorde, were skeptical of the idea that black feminists could be entirely invested in both the women's rights and black liberation movements, as a result of the racial and sexual politics within each movement. King disagrees, suggesting that black women, as victims of multiple systems of inequality, are able to perceive these systems in action and recognize how they operate together. This awareness is referred to as "multiple consciousness". King suggests that those who are affected by multiple jeopardy exhibit multiple consciousness, giving them a special understanding of the way different inequalities work together to create systems of discrimination in a way a person experiencing just one form of prejudice could not perceive on their own.

While King suggests the relationship between multiple jeopardy and multiple consciousness, there are few studies explicitly examining the link between them. However, scholars have pointed to existing studies on discrimination to support this relationship, noting that, while women are more likely than men to report experiencing discrimination on the basis of gender, minority men are more likely than minority women to report experiencing discrimination on the basis of race or ethnicity. This suggests a difference in one's ability to perceive forms of discrimination when they are victims of more than one system of discrimination.

Multiple consciousness arises as a coping and interpretive way for those facing multiple jeopardy. For Black women specifically, this awareness helps them recognize how race, gender, and other social hierarchies could interact uniquely in their lives. Unlike individuals experiencing discrimination based on a single identity, Black women, and others facing intersecting oppressions, develop a nuanced understanding of how systems of power could interlock and reinforce one another. Multiple consciousness enables them to see how broader social systems perpetuate these forms of inequality.

This awareness empowers marginalized individuals, especially, the Black women, to resist these structures through their activism, self-advocacy, and community involvement. This multi-layered insight not only helps them to navigate the oppression and discrimination they faced but also cultivates a foundation for collective resistance and empowerment, making multiple consciousness a critical element in intersectional feminist frameworks and Black feminist thoughts.

== Multiple jeopardy and intersectionality ==
The theories of multiple jeopardy and intersectionality have many similarities. Intersectionality, as described by Kimberlé Crenshaw in her 1989 work “Demarginalizing the Intersection of Race and Sex: A Black Feminist Critique of Antidiscrimination Doctrine, Feminist Theory and Antiracist Politics”, describes the ways in which multiple forms of inequality overlap and create complex obstacles. Crenshaw and King agreed upon many things in their writings.

Both of them argue that focusing on a single aspects of identity, such as merely the factor of gender or only race, is insufficient for understanding the entire scope of discrimination. They highlight how traditional feminist and civil rights movements have sometimes failed to account for the compounded experiences of Black women, who face discrimination both as women and as members of a racial minority. In addition, Both assert that the forms of discrimination are not merely additive but are interconnected and multiplicative. King refers to this as multiple jeopardy, where each discrimination intensifies the other, while, a year later, Crenshaw’s concept of intersectionality explains more how these overlapping identities create unique forms of marginalization that differ from those faced by individuals with only one marginalized identity.

Despite their similarities, these theories cannot be conflated. Intersectionality and multiple jeopardy agree that focusing on the experiences of the most privileged members of a group marginalizes those that are “multiply-burdened”, but intersectionality further suggests that this focus on the privileged creates a contorted perception of racism and sexism because they are based on a subset of the entire group. Crenshaw goes on to emphasize how the intersection between identities creates inherently distinct experiences, particularly in the contexts of law, policy, and social justice. Intersectionality theory distinctly states that marginalized people who face multiple inequalities will have unique experiences in societal institutions as a result of their intersecting identities, and this makes it very valuable in the contexts of modern law and policy. The multiple jeopardy theory is crucial to understanding intersectional identities and their broader societal implications.

== Multiple jeopardy and the matrix of domination ==
The matrix of domination refers to the theory that oppression as a result of differences in race, class, gender, sexual orientation, religion, and age, are all interconnected, despite all being in different categories. It is often recognized incorrectly by scholars by prioritizing one form of injustice while ignoring the others. Inspired by the works of bell hooks, King sought to avoid this when she coined the term multiple jeopardy. She proposes that the multiple inequalities some people face is not expanded through quantity, but by quality. She did not argue that inequalities are all discriminated equally. King is critiquing "single-identity" politics and feminists that rank oppressions.

Multiple jeopardy is related to the matrix of domination. By recognizing the multiple consequences of homophobia and heterosexism for lesbians and gay men, King's multi-jeopardy theory provides a deeper comprehension of the matrix of domination. This term, used by Patricia Hill Collins, refers to how each prejudice intersects and overlaps to form an inseparable link, creating an interlocking system of oppression. In the United States, domination can be seen in institutions such as schools, employment, housing, the government, and other social elements. The domination of the superior group affects those who are/have been socially oppressed due to the factors that have historically caused them disadvantages. The idea of multiple jeopardy feeds into the concept of the matrix of domination because it is these multiple factors - gender, race, sex, class, religion and other social/cultural identities - that have historically caused many disadvantages for certain groups of people.

== Quantified data supporting the multiple jeopardy theory ==
Studies have documented the cumulative impact of multiple forms of discrimination on individuals with intersecting minority identities. A research in 2015 by Catherine E. Harnois, based on survey data from Western Europe, found that individuals holding multiple minority statuses reported experiencing discrimination across multiple social categories, such as race, gender, and socio-economic status, more frequently than those with a single minority status. This data supports the multiple jeopardy theory, which suggests that intersecting identities may correlate with increased experiences of discrimination.

A study in 2024 by André Ndobo and colleagues focusing on unemployed older women, another group with multiple marginalized identities, also observed an increase in psychological distress and self-esteem issues among those experiencing multiple forms of discrimination compared to individuals reporting single-status discrimination. This research highlights that individuals facing compounded discrimination may employ additional coping strategies, aligning with theories that suggest compounded negative effects associated with multiple jeopardy.

== Dr. Deborah K. King ==
Dr. Deborah K. King is a Black feminist scholar and sociologist known for her work on examining the intersections of race, gender, and class in the experiences of Black women. Over the past four decades, she has written and published multiple works that speak to specific experiences Black women were facing at the times they were written. Her work has been very influential in shaping conversations around sociology and women's studies. She is currently an associate professor of sociology at Dartmouth College and has many more publications in progress.

== See also ==
- Intersectionality
- Discrimination
- Social inequality
- Triple oppression
- Matrix of domination
- Black feminism
