= Feminist: Stories from Women's Liberation =

- Film poster
- Directed by: Jennifer H. Lee
- Written by: Jennifer H. Lee
- Music by: Fanny and Robert Wait
- Distributed by: Women Make Movies
- Release date: March 2013
- Running time: 64 minutes

Feminist: Stories from Women's Liberation is a 2013 American documentary film written and directed by Jennifer Lee.

== Synopsis ==
Women Make Movies wrote: "Structured as a personal journey of rediscovery by filmmaker Jennifer Lee, this documentary brings the momentous first decade of secondwave feminism vividly to life. Its trajectory starts with the earliest stirrings in 1963 and ends with the movement's full blossoming in 1970—from the Presidential Commission's report on widespread discrimination against women and publication of Betty Friedan's Feminine Mystique up through radical feminists' takeover of the Statue of Liberty and Friedan's calls for a women's strike for equality.

Thirty-five diverse interviewees, including rank-and-file activists along with well-known feminists Betty Friedan, Frances M. Beale, Gloria Steinem, Robin Morgan, Ti-Grace Atkinson, and others, share memories of the period as well as issues and challenges that still resonate today."

== Production ==
Director Jennifer Lee majored in film and women's studies at Hampshire College before working in the technical departments of Warner Bros., Sony and Industrial Light & Magic.

Lee worked on the film "in bits and pieces" for nine years while working full-time. She combined selected archival footage with the interviews, including the last recorded video interview with Betty Friedan. The production received $12,000 support from a Kickstarter campaign, but Lee has also stated 'My budget was 90 percent financed by me.'

Lee has written of her experience in Time:

I began making my film, Feminist, in 2004 as a straightforward documentary about historical facts, but I learned so much that I finished the film a different person ... I figured we don't celebrate the Women's Movement like we do other social movements because it was too complex—encompassing issues of class, religion, race, and language, among others ... I thought it might be hard to pull out individual successes to honor. But I was wrong: As I worked on the film, I discovered many concrete successes—including ones that weren't included in textbooks or honored in public memorials.

== Release ==
Lee brought her film to Islamabad, Pakistan, and screened it to three universities including the International Islamic University, Islamabad. It has also screened at film festivals in the United States, and conferences including the 2014 National Organization for Women conference and the 20th anniversary conference of Veteran American Feminists. The film is distributed through Women Make Movies.

== Reception ==
The film was awarded "Best of Festival Documentary" at the 2013 Los Angeles Women's International Film Festival and was an Official Selection of the Cincinnati Film Festival.

Ellen Snortland of the Pasadena Weekly wrote, "If I had a magic wand and could bonk you with it, I'd spirit you to a screening of a documentary I wish were mandatory viewing in schools: It's called "Feminist: Stories from Women's Liberation."

Kamala Lopez of The Huffington Post wrote: "Remembering and studying the women who broke the barriers before us is not just the right thing to do; we ignore their hard-won lessons at our own peril. For American women, our careless amnesia is plain poison and Lee's film is a healthy portion of the antidote". Adding that the history of second-wave feminism is "beautifully laid out in Lee's film".

The film has also been reviewed by Ms. magazine blog, Psychology Today blog, and by the University of Texas' Mercury.
