= Endangered (disambiguation) =

An endangered species is a population of organisms which is at risk of becoming extinct.

An endangered language is a language at risk of falling out of use.

Endangered may also refer to:

- Endangered (album), a 2001 album by Pink Cream 69
- Into the Grizzly Maze or Endangered, a 2015 American horror/thriller film
- Endangered (2022 film), an American documentary film about journalists
- Once Upon a Forest (working title The Endangered), a 1993 Hanna-Barbera animated film
- "Endangered" (Grimm), a television episode
- "The Endangered" (MacGyver), a television episode

== See also ==
- Endangerment (disambiguation)
