= Oppression =

Unjust treatment

Oppression is malicious or unjust treatment of, or exercise of power over, a group of individuals, often in the form of governmental authority. There are many scholars who have attempted to define oppression, usually by the types of harm suffered by those who are persecuted.

== Authoritarian oppression ==
The word oppress comes from the Latin oppressus, past participle of opprimere, ("to press against", "to squeeze", "to suffocate"). Thus, when authoritarian governments use oppression to subjugate the people, they want their citizenry to feel that "pressing down", and to live in fear that if they displease the authorities they will, in a metaphorical sense, be "squeezed" and "suffocated". Such governments oppress the people using restriction, control, terror, hopelessness, and despair. The tyrant's tools of oppression include, for example, extremely harsh punishments for "unpatriotic" statements; developing a secret police force; prohibiting freedom of assembly, freedom of speech, and freedom of the press; controlling the monetary system and economy; and imprisoning or killing activists or other leaders who might pose a threat to their power.

== Socioeconomic, political, legal, cultural, and institutional oppression ==
Oppression also refers to the subjugation and marginalization of specific groups of people within a country or society, such as women, people of color, religious communities, citizens in poverty, LGBT people, youth and children, and more. This socioeconomic, cultural, political, legal, and social oppression can occur in every country, culture, and society, including advanced democracies.

There is no single, widely accepted definition of social oppression. Philosopher Elanor Taylor defines social oppression in this way:

Oppression is a form of injustice that occurs when one social group is subordinated while another is privileged, and oppression is maintained by a variety of different mechanisms including social norms, stereotypes and institutional rules. A key feature of oppression is that it is perpetrated by and affects social groups. ... [Oppression] occurs when a particular social group is unjustly subordinated, and where that subordination is not necessarily deliberate but instead results from a complex network of social restrictions, ranging from laws and institutions to implicit biases and stereotypes. In such cases, there may be no deliberate attempt to subordinate the relevant group, but the group is nonetheless unjustly subordinated by this network of social constraints.

Philosopher Jean Harvey, suggests the term "civilized oppression", which she introduces as follows:

It is harder still to become aware of what I call 'civilized Oppression,' that involves neither physical violence nor the use of law. Yet these subtle forms are by far the most prevalent in Western industrialized societies. This work will focus on issues that are common to such subtle oppression in several different contexts (such as racism, classism, and sexism) ... Analyzing what is involved in civilized oppression includes analyzing the kinds of mechanisms used, the power relations at work, the systems controlling perceptions and information, the kinds of harms inflicted on the victims, and the reasons why this oppression is so hard to see even by contributing agents.

== Social oppression ==
A common conception of social oppression is seen as when a single group in society unjustly takes advantage of, and exercises power over, another group using dominance and subordination. This then results in the socially supported mistreatment and exploitation of a group of individuals by those with relative power. In a social group setting, oppression may be based on many ideas, such as poverty, gender, class, race, caste, or other categories.

According to Iris Marion Young, due to its pluralistic character, it is difficult to construct a definition that applies to all forms of oppression. Therefore, she argues one should focus on the characteristics different forms of oppression might exhibit or have in common. In order to do so, she develops five characteristics or 'faces' of oppression. Each form of oppression possesses at least one of the following characteristics: exploitation, marginalization, powerlessness, cultural imperialism, and violence. Missing from this conception of oppression is the involvement of an "active oppressor", meaning it can occur regardless of the identification of such individuals. Or, in her own words:

[O]ppression is the inhibition of a group through a vast network of everyday practices, attitudes, assumptions, behaviors, and institutional rules. Oppression is structural or systemic. The systemic character of oppression implies that an oppressed group need not have a correlate oppressing group.

Structural or systemic refers to "the rules that constitute and regulate the major sectors of life such as family relations, property ownership and exchange, political powers and responsibilities, and so on". This conception of oppression is therefore in contrast with other common notions of oppression, where an identifiable oppressing group is assumed. To illustrate its broadly-encompassing nature, she gives as example a specific social group being denied access to education that may hinder their lives in later life. Economic oppression is the divide between two classes of society. These were once determined by factors such slavery, property rights, disenfranchisement, and forced displacement of livelihood. Each divide yielded various treatments and attitudes towards each group.

According to Marilyn Frye, one of the most common characteristics of social oppression is the "double-bind", a situation where the oppressed are exposed to limited options, all of which incurring social penalty. An example of said situation exists for young women in the 21st century regarding sexual activity. Both sexual inactivity and sexual activity might incur a penalty. If a woman is sexually inactive, her parents might worry that she is abnormal, and men will complain that she is "frigid" and "uptight", while in the latter situation she may be condemned for being a whore. This scenario reveals how oppression may not necessarily be caused by individual oppressors, following Young's conclusions.

Social oppression derives from power dynamics and imbalances related to the social location of a group or individual. Social location, as defined by Lynn Weber, is "an individual's or a group's social 'place' in the race, class, gender and sexuality hierarchies, as well as in other critical social hierarchies such as age, ethnicity, and nation". An individual's social location often determines how they will be perceived and treated by others in society. Three elements shape whether a group or individual can exercise power: the power to design or manipulate the rules and regulations, the capacity to win competitions through the exercise of political or economic force, and the ability to write and document social and political history.

Jim Sidanius suggests that there are four predominant social hierarchies, race, class, gender and sexuality, that contribute to social oppression. Audre Lorde, on the other hand, believes that there cannot be any hierarchy of oppression due to her experiences as both a Black and lesbian woman. In "There is no Hierarchy of Oppressions," she suggests that all oppressed groups share the same issue. She writes that "any attack against black people is a lesbian and gay issue", promoting the idea that due to intersectionality within a given group, all of its members and their respective groups are under threat, viewing the concept of oppression as originating from a root source which seeks to alienate all groups not in power.

One aspect of social oppression's effectiveness is the stigmatization of "resistance": Resistance to oppression has been linked to a moral obligation, an act deemed necessary for the preservation of self and society. Resistance is sometimes labeled as "lawlessness, belligerence, envy, or laziness".

=== Privilege ===
Lynn Weber, among some other political theorists, argues that oppression persists because most individuals fail to recognize it; that is, discrimination is often not visible to those who are not in the midst of it. "Privilege" refers to a sociopolitical immunity one group has over others derived from particular societal benefits. Many of the groups who have privilege over gender, race, or sexuality, for example, can be unaware of the power their privilege holds. These inequalities further perpetuate themselves because those who are oppressed rarely have access to resources that would allow them to escape their maltreatment. This can lead to internalized oppression, where subordinate groups essentially give up the fight to get access to equality, and accept their fate as a non-dominant group.

Scholar L. Ayu Saraswati highlights the potency of privilege hidden within groups generally considered oppressed. Such can occur within women, as second-wave feminism disproportionately focused on white women and their respective issues rather than women as a whole. This led to Black women and the higher level of economic challenges they were faced with being unaddressed, and often uplifted women only in a racially privileged position. According to Saraswati, by not fighting the presuppositions of racism, these actors in the women's movement failed to address their oppression at its root, simultaneously fighting for the issues of white women and accepting the societal structures which held Black women down. Even when Black feminists bring up issues of both gender and class, they often fail to account for heterosexual privilege amidst Black women, still supporting homophobic assumptions about sexuality and leaving many members of the movement behind.

=== Racial oppression ===
Race or racial oppression is defined as "burdening a specific race with unjust or cruel restraints or impositions. Racial oppression may be social, systematic, institutionalized, or internalized. Social forms of racial oppression include exploitation and mistreatment that is socially supported." In his 1972 work, Racial Oppression in America, sociologist Bob Blauner proposes five primary forms of racial oppression in United States history: genocide and geographical displacement, slavery, second-class citizenship, non-citizen labor, and diffuse racial discrimination. Blauner states that even after civil rights legislation abolished legally-sanctioned segregation, racial oppression remained a reality in the United States and "racial groups and racial oppression are central features of the American social dynamic".

Roma are the most oppressed ethnic group in Europe.

=== Class discrimination ===
Class oppression, sometimes referred to as classism, can be defined as prejudice and discrimination based on social class. Class is a social ranking system which is based on income, wealth, education, status, and power. A class is a large group of people who share similar economic or social positions based on their income, wealth, property ownership, job status, education, skills, or power in the economic and political sphere. The most commonly used class categories include upper class, middle class, working class, and poor class. Class is also experienced differently depending on race, gender, ethnicity, global location, disability, and more. Class oppression of the poor and working class can lead to deprivation of basic needs and a feeling of inferiority to higher-class people, as well as shame towards one's traditional class, race, gender, or ethnic heritage. In the United States, class has become racialized leaving the greater percentage of people of color living in poverty.

=== Gender oppression ===
Gender oppression is a form of social oppression, which occurs due to belonging or seeming to belong to a specific gender. Historically, gender oppression occurred through actual legal domination and subordination of men over women. Even key aspects of social life traditionally seen as "neutral", such as language, can sustain gender oppression according to Gertrude Postl. This is due to sexist language and the lack of terms that relate to experiences specific to women. For example, the term "sexual harassment" was only coined in 1975.

Young argues that women in particular suffer from gender-based exploitation, powerlessness, cultural imperialism, and violence. To illustrate, gender exploitation relates to how the common labor division between men and women can be exploitative. She argues that "gender exploitation has two aspects, transfer of the fruits of material labor to men and transfer of nurturing and sexual energies to men". Specifically, in a heterosexual relationship, women often take care of unpaid households chores and child care labor, which benefits both the man as the woman. In this sense, women are performing labor from which the man benefits and thus at least part of the value of this labor is transferred to the man. This exploitation need not be done consciously or even intentionally. As Young argues, oppression can occur without an active "oppressor". This definition of oppression attempts to address the concern that feminist theories unjustly blame men for the oppression of women. Men can sympathize with feminism, but still be complicit in the oppression of women.

In her article on oppression, Marilyn Frye suggests a myopic approach is necessary to understand how in society at large, women are sequestered to a second class role. Though individual barriers, such as small actions resulting of social roles and expectations, may not provide too much of a barrier for any one woman, the interweaving of many of said actions through each day and each year eventually builds a net which very well might hold a woman in place, and keep her in the role she is ordered to maintain. One simple example is the custom of men holding the door for a woman, which may be well-intentioned, but implies that women are uncapable of doing simple tasks themselves.

=== Religious persecution ===
Religious persecution is the systematic mistreatment of individuals because of their religious beliefs. According to Iris Young oppression can be divided into different categories such as powerlessness, exploitation, and violence.

An example of religious powerlessness existed during the 17th century when the Pilgrims, who wanted to escape the rule of the Church of England came to what is now called the United States. The Pilgrims created their own religion, which was another form of Protestantism, and after doing so they eventually passed laws in order to prevent other religions from prospering in their colony. The Pilgrims and the leaders of other communities where Protestants were in the majority used their power over legislatures to oppress followers of other religions in the United States.

The second category of oppression, exploitation, has been seen in many different forms around the world when it comes to religion. The definition of exploitation is the action or fact of treating someone unfairly in order to benefit from their work. For example, during, and particularly after, the American Civil War, white Americans used Chinese immigrants to build the transcontinental railroads. During this time it was common for the Chinese immigrants to follow the religions of Buddhism, Taoism, and Confucianism, because of this the Chinese were considered different and therefore not equal to white Americans. Due to this view Chinese workers were denied equal pay, and they also suffered many hardships during the time which they spent working on the railroad.

The third and most extreme category of oppression is violence. According to the Merriam-Webster's dictionary, violence is "the use of physical force so as to injure, abuse, damage, or destroy". Acts of religious violence which are committed against people who practice a particular religion are classified as hate crimes. Since September 11th, 2001, the number of hate crimes which have been committed against Muslims in the United States has greatly increased. One such incident occurred on August 5, 2017, when three men bombed a mosque in Minnesota because they felt that Muslims "'push their beliefs on everyone else'". Acts of religious violence are also committed against practitioners of other religions in addition to Islam.

Different types of religious symbols

=== Institutionalized oppression ===
Institutional oppression occurs when established laws, customs, and practices systemically reflect and produce inequities based on one's membership in targeted social identity groups. If oppressive consequences accrue to institutional laws, customs, or practices, the institution is oppressive whether or not the individuals maintaining those practices have oppressive intentions."

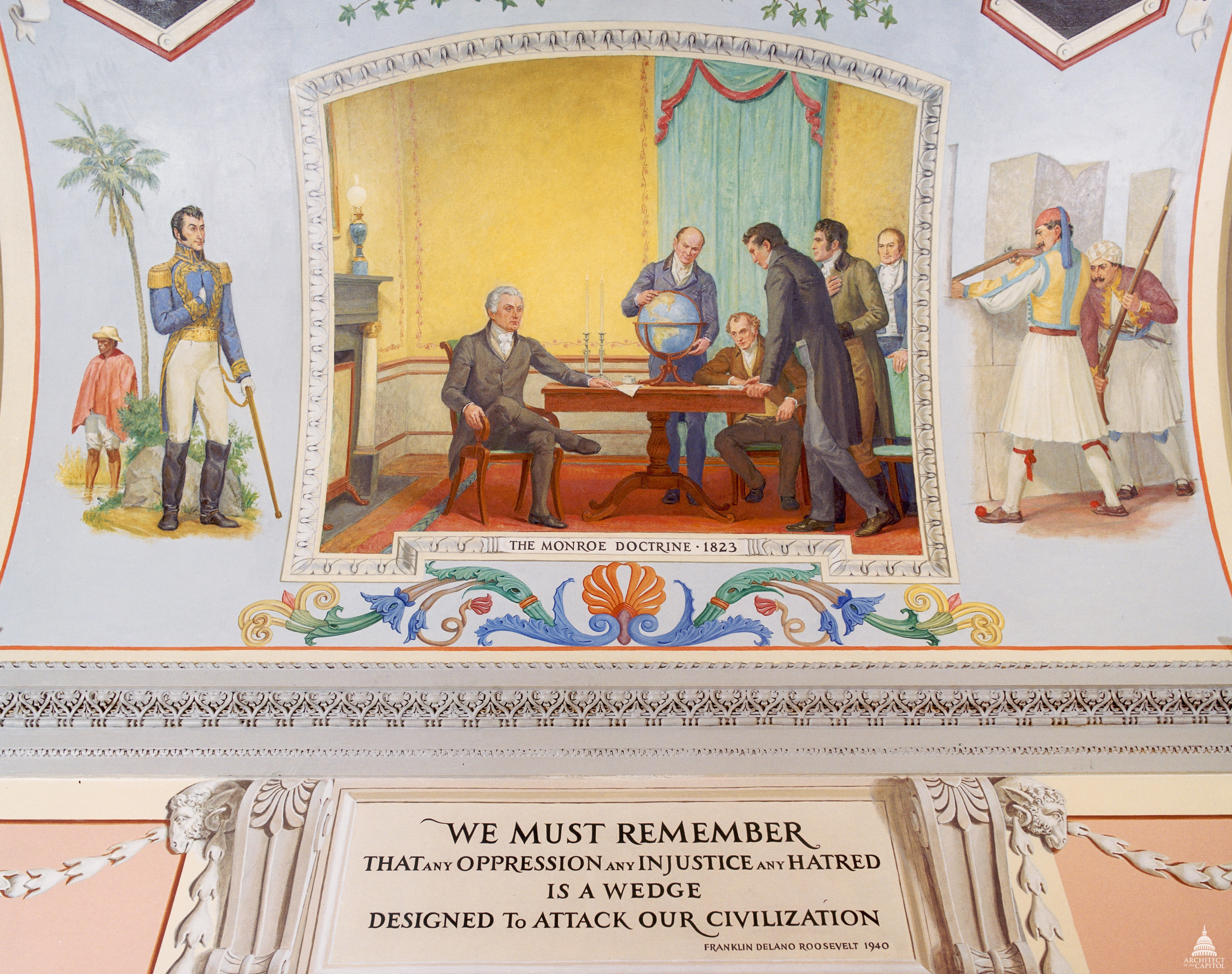
U.S. Capitol – oil painting by Allyn Cox – The Monroe Doctrine (1823), plus a quote from President Franklin D. Roosevelt (1940).

Institutionalized oppression allows for government, religious, and business organizations and their employees to systematically favor specific groups of people based upon group identity. Dating back to colonization, the United States implemented the annihilation of Native Americans from lands that Euro-Americans wanted, and condoned the institution of slavery where Africans were brought to the New World to be a source of free labor to expand the cotton and tobacco industry.

Although the thirteenth, fourteenth, and fifteenth amendments freed African Americans, gave them citizenship, and provided them the right to vote, institutions such as some police departments continue to use oppressive systems against racial minorities. They train their officers to profile individuals based upon their racial heritage, and to exert excessive force to restrain them. Racial profiling and police brutality are "employed to control a population thought to be undesirable, undeserving, and under punished by established law". In both situations, police officers "rely on legal authority to exonerate their extralegal use of force; both respond to perceived threats and fears aroused by out-groups, especially— but not exclusively— racial minorities". For example, "blacks are: approximately four times more likely to be targeted for police use of force than their white counterparts; arrested and convicted for drug-related criminal activities at higher rates than their overall representation in the U.S. population; and are more likely to fear unlawful and harsh treatment by law enforcement officials". The International Association of Chiefs of Police collected data from police departments between the years 1995 and 2000 and found that 83% of incidents involving use-of-force against subjects of different races than the officer executing it involved a white officer and a Black subject.

Institutionalized oppression is not only experienced by people of racial minorities, but can also affect those in the LGBT community. In April 1953, US President Dwight D. Eisenhower issued Executive Order 10450, which permitted non-binary sexual behaviors to be investigated by federal agencies. In addition, states such as Arizona and Kansas passed laws in 2014 giving religious-based businesses "the right to refuse service to LGBT customers". In 2018 and 2023, the US Supreme Court ruled against Colorado's anti-discrimination laws in Masterpiece Cakeshop v. Colorado Civil Rights Commission and 303 Creative LLC v. Elenis respectively.

School segregation in the United States is observed by some educators as oppression or closure because students are denied access to resources and the privileged class is signaled that its denial of goods is justified.

=== Economic oppression ===
Economic oppression can take many forms, including, but not limited to, serfdom, forced labour, low wages, denial of equal opportunity, bonded labor, employment discrimination, and economic discrimination based on sex, nationality, race, or religion.

Ann Cudd describes the main forces of economic oppression as oppressive economic systems and direct and indirect forces. Even though capitalism and socialism are not inherently oppressive, they "lend themselves to oppression in characteristic ways". She defines direct forces of economic oppression as "restrictions on opportunities that are applied from the outside on the oppressed, including enslavement, segregation, employment discrimination, group-based harassment, opportunity inequality, neocolonialism, and governmental corruption". This allows for a dominant social group to maintain and maximize its wealth through the intentional exploitation of economically inferior subordinates. With indirect forces (also known as oppression by choice), "the oppressed are co-opted into making individual choices that add to their own oppression". The oppressed are faced with having to decide to go against their social good, and even against their own good. If they choose otherwise, they have to choose against their interests, which may lead to resentment by their group.

An example of direct forces of economic oppression is employment discrimination in the form of the gender pay gap. Restrictions on women's access to and participation in the workforce like the wage gap is an "inequality most identified with industrialized nations with nominal equal opportunity laws; legal and cultural restrictions on access to education and jobs, inequities most identified with developing nations; and unequal access to capital, variable but identified as a difficulty in both industrialized and developing nations". In the United States, the median weekly earnings for women were 82 percent of the median weekly earnings for men in 2016. Some argue women are prevented from achieving complete gender equality in the workplace because of the "ideal-worker norm," which "defines the committed worker as someone who works full-time and full force for forty years straight," a situation designed for the male sex.

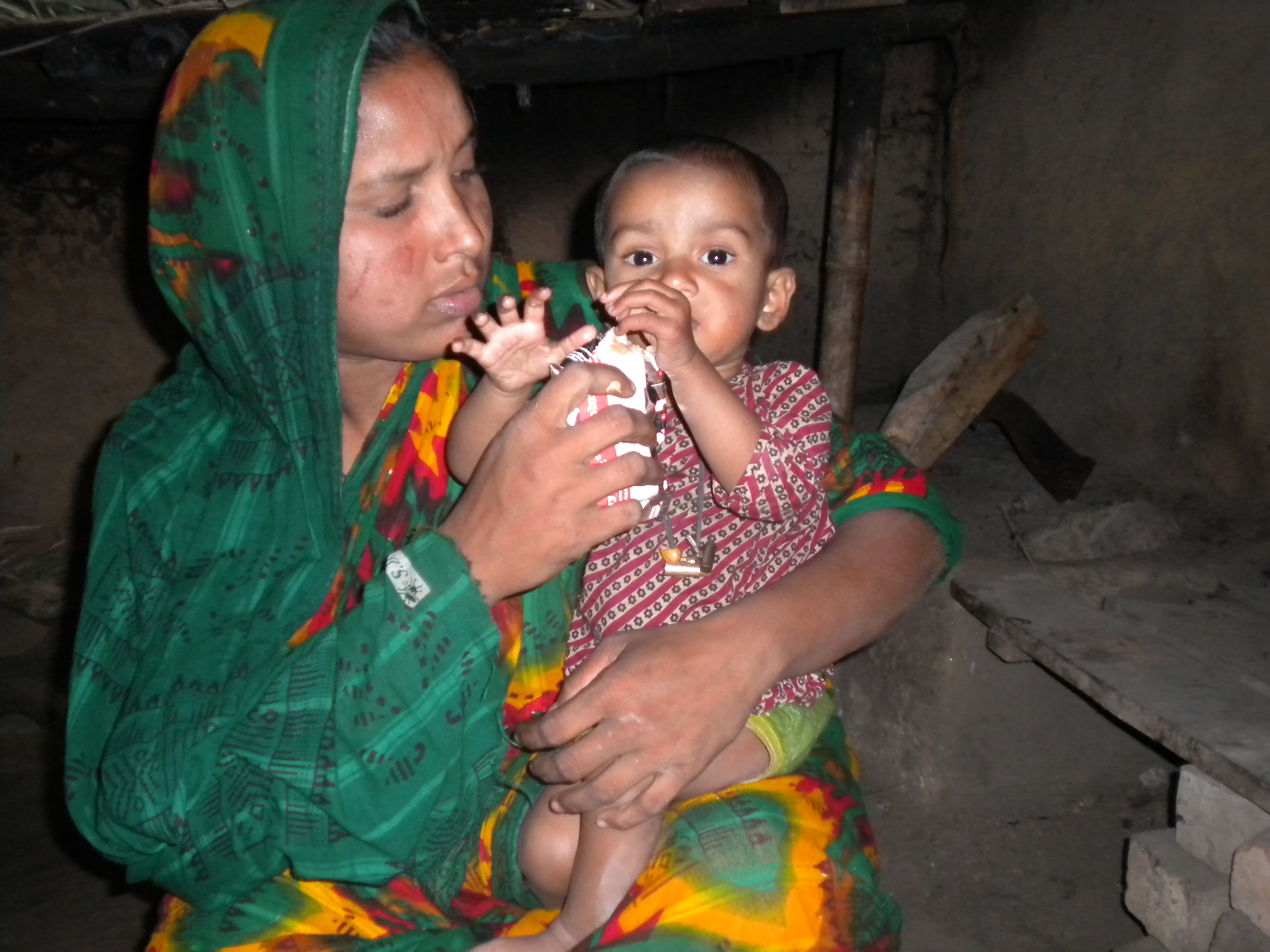
A mother taking care of her child by feeding them.

Women, in contrast, are still expected to fulfill the caretaker role and take time off for domestic needs such as pregnancy and ill family members, preventing them from conforming to the "ideal-worker norm". With the current norm in place, women are forced to juggle full-time jobs and family care at home. Others believe that this difference in wage earnings is likely due to the supply and demand for women in the market because of family obligations. Eber and Weichselbaumer argue that "over time, raw wage differentials worldwide have fallen substantially. Most of this decrease is due to better labor market endowments of females".

Indirect economic oppression is exemplified when individuals work abroad to support their families. Outsourced employees, working abroad generally little to no bargaining power not only with their employers, but with immigration authorities as well. They could be forced to accept low wages and work in poor living conditions. And by working abroad, an outsourced employee contributes to the economy of a foreign country instead of their own. Veltman and Piper describe the effects of outsourcing on female laborers abroad:

Her work may be oppressive first in respects of being heteronomous: she may enter work under conditions of constraint; her work may bear no part of reflectively held life goals; and she may not even have the: freedom of bodily movement at work. Her work may also fail to permit a meaningful measure of economic independence or to help her support herself or her family, which she identifies as the very purpose of her working.

By deciding to work abroad, laborers are "reinforcing the forces of economic oppression that presented them with such poor options".

== Oppression and intersectionality ==
A different approach on oppression, called the intersectional approach was introduced by Kimberlé Crenshaw to refer to the various ways in which race and gender interact to shape the multiple dimensions of Black women's employment experiences. Elena Ruiz defines intersectionality as a form of oppression containing multiple social vectors and overlapping identity categories such as sex, race, and class that are not ready visible in single identities, but have to be taken into account as an integral, robust human experience.

An intersectional approach to oppression requires attending to the differential ways different grounds for oppression such as gender, race, sexuality, class, religion, and so forth work together to create a unique situation for certain oppressed people. Crenshaw argues that viewing feminism as categorizing all women as one cohesive category of oppressed people obscures differences of experiences of oppression within such groups. A Black woman is not just the sum of the two categories.

This intersectional approach has been influential in academic fields studying different forms of social oppression. However, although Crenshaw argues her intersectional approach captures important differences within certain oppressed groups, Patricia Hill Collins objects that her approach is unable to capture the macro-level systemic nature of intersectional oppression.

Authors such as Jennifer Nash explore what the limits of intersectionality. For instance, does this approach only concern marginalized groups, or is everyone intersectional in some way. Guiding questions in this regard concern in what way an intersectional approach might bring to the surface certain previously obscured experiences of oppression.

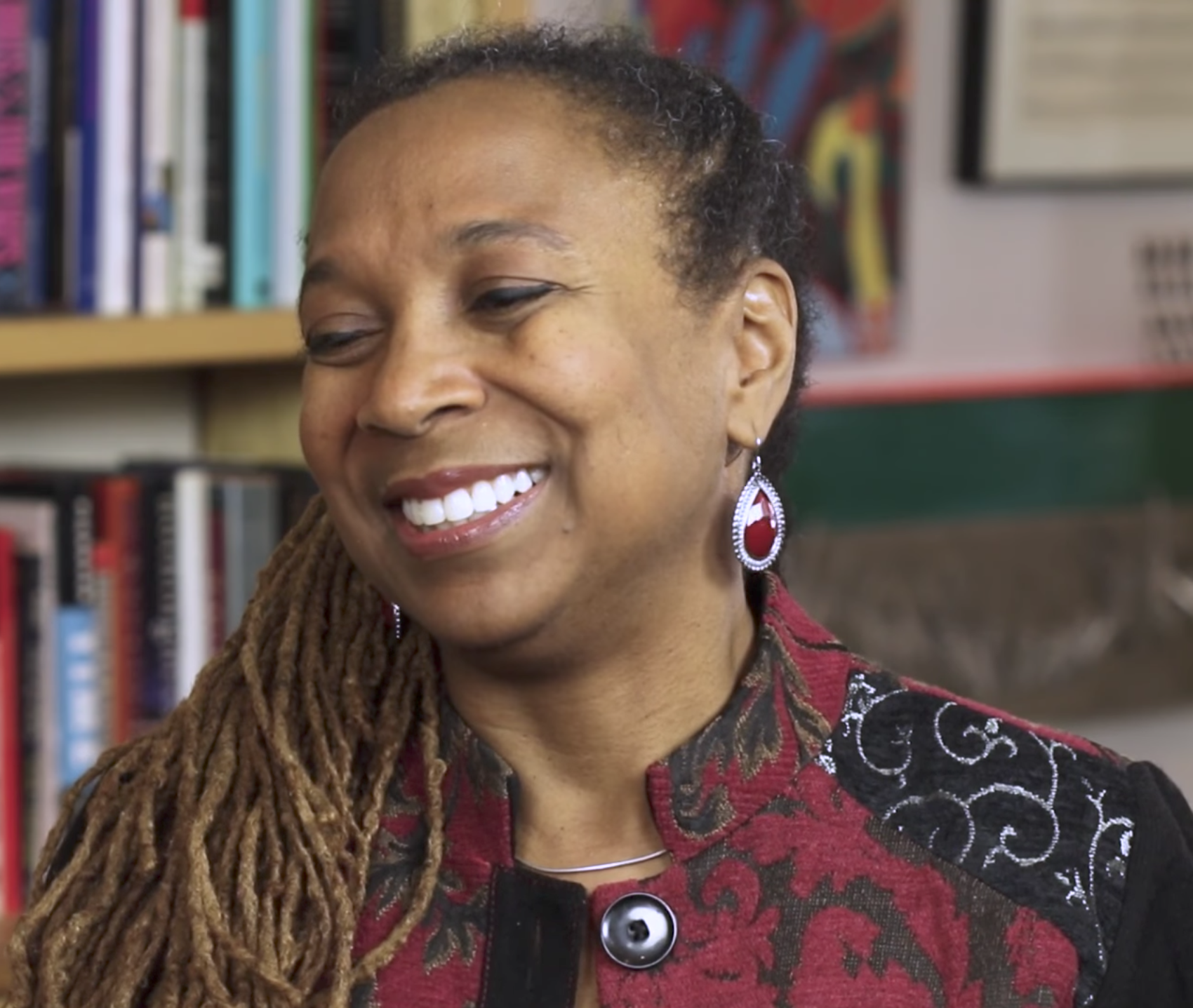
Kimberlé Crenshaw introducing her concept of intersectionality at one of her lectures

=== Feminism and equal rights ===
In her article "Feminist Politics," bell hooks discusses the intersectional challenges of the early feminist movements in the 20th century. She divides female activists into groups labeled the "reformist" and "revolutionary" feminists. Reformist feminists were often at the forefront of the media, primarily as a result of their unspoken support of other forms of oppression, and more easily met requests. Reformist feminists, upon finding a route to class mobility, refused to acknowledge the now niche revolutionary feminist movement, as they had found a way to live in an economically powerful way in the current social system.

=== Domination theory ===
Addressing social oppression on both a macro and micro level, feminist Patricia Hill Collins discusses what she calls the "matrix of domination". The matrix maps the interrelated nature of four domains of power: the structural, disciplinary, hegemonic, and interpersonal domains. Each of these domains works to sustain current inequalities faced by marginalized, excluded, or oppressed groups. The structural, disciplinary, and hegemonic domains all operate on a macro level, creating social oppression through macro structures such as education, or the criminal justice system, which play out in the interpersonal sphere of everyday life through micro-oppressions.

== See also ==
- Abuse of power
- Anti-oppressive practice
- Authoritarianism
- Persecution
- Political repression
- Sexism
- Police oppression
- Triple oppression

== Sources ==
- Cudd, Ann E. (2006). Analyzing oppression. Oxford University Press US. ISBN 0-19-518744-X.
- Deutsch, M. (2006). A framework for thinking about oppression and its change. Social Justice Research, 19(1), 7–41. doi:10.1007/s11211-006-9998-3
- Gil, David G. (2013). Confronting injustice and oppression: Concepts and strategies for social workers (2nd ed.). New York City, NY: Columbia University Press. ISBN 9780231163996 OCLC 846740522
- Harvey, J. (1999). Civilized oppression. Lanham, MD: Rowman & Littlefield. ISBN 0847692744
- Marin, Mara (2017). Connected by commitment: Oppression and our responsibility to undermine it. New York City, NY: Oxford University Press. ISBN 9780190498627 OCLC 989519441
- Noël, Lise (1989). L'Intolérance. Une problématique générale (Intolerance: a general survey). Montréal (Québec), Canada: Boréal. ISBN 9782890522718. OCLC 20723090.
- Opotow, S. (1990). Moral exclusion and injustice: an introduction. Journal of Social Issues, 46(1), 1–20. doi:10.1111/j.1540-4560.1990.tb00268.x
- Young, Iris (1990). Justice and the politics of difference (2011 reissue; foreword by Danielle Allen). Princeton, NJ: Princeton University Press. ISBN 9780691152622 OCLC 778811811
- Young-Bruehl, Elisabeth (1996). The anatomy of prejudices. Cambridge, MA: Harvard University Press. ISBN 978-0-674-03190-6. OCLC 442469051.
