= Endangerment (disambiguation) =

Endangerment is a type of crime.

Endangerment may also refer to:

- Language endangerment, the risk that a language will fall out of use
- Species endangerment, the risk that a population of organisms will become extinct

== See also ==
- Endangered (disambiguation)
- Jeopardy (disambiguation)
