= Jeopardy (disambiguation) =

Jeopardy! is an American television game show.

Jeopardy may also refer to:

== Film and television ==
- Jeopardy! (franchise), media franchise that began with a television quiz show
  - Jeopardy! (British game show), a British adaptation of the American game show
- Jeopardy (film), a 1953 film starring Barbara Stanwyck and Ralph Meeker
- Jeopardy (British 2002 TV series), a children's science fiction drama BBC TV series
- "Jeopardy" (NCIS), an episode of NCIS
- Jeopardy! Australia, an Australian version of the American game show

== Music ==
- Jeopardy (album), a 1980 album by the Sound
- "Jeopardy" (song), a 1983 song by the Greg Kihn Band
- "Jeopardy", a song from Run the Jewels 2, by Run the Jewels

== Other uses ==
- Jeopardy (legal topic) or double jeopardy
- Jeopardy (political topic) or multiple jeopardy
- "In jeopardy", a baseball term for a baserunner who is not safely on base

== See also ==
- Endangerment (disambiguation)
- Risk
- Peril
- Single jeopardy (disambiguation)
- Double Jeopardy (disambiguation)
- Triple Jeopardy (disambiguation)
