= Third World Women's Alliance =

Revolutionary socialist women-of-color organization active from 1968 to 1980

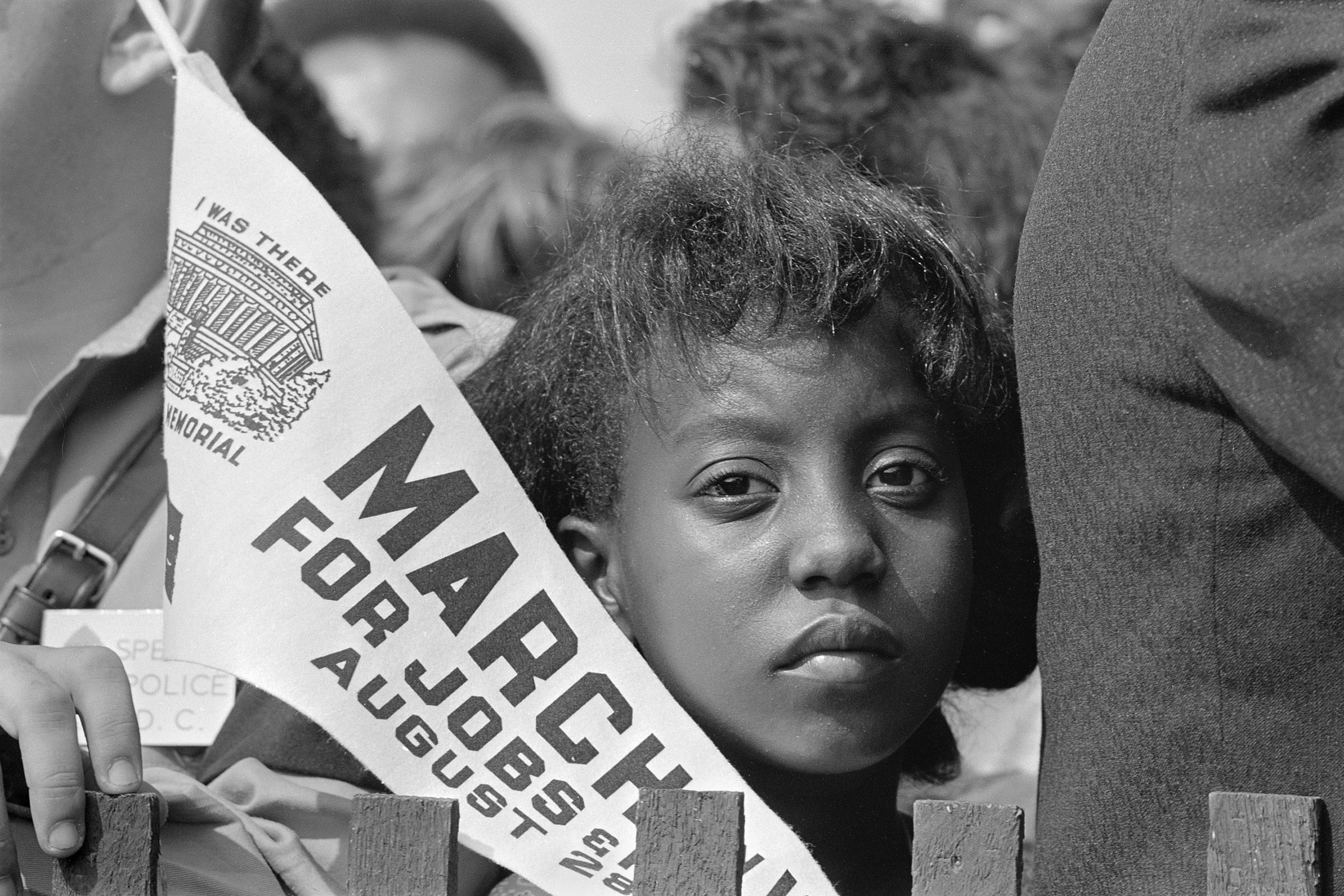
A woman protesting during the black civil rights movement.

The Third World Women's Alliance (TWWA) was a revolutionary socialist organization for women of color active in the United States from 1968 to 1980. It aimed at ending capitalism, racism, imperialism, and sexism and was one of the earliest groups advocating for an intersectional approach to women's oppression. Members of the TWWA argued that women of color faced a "triple jeopardy" of race, gender, and class oppression. The TWWA worked to address these intersectional issues, internationally and domestically, specifically focusing much of their efforts in Cuba. Though the organization's roots lay in the black civil rights movement, it soon broadened its focus to include women of color in the US and developing nations.

== History ==
During the second feminist wave, women of color were finished being left out of the mainstream feminist movement. The issues highlighted by the mainstream movement were not intersectional and did not encapsulate the lived experience of women of color. Even in campaigns focused on racial inequalities, women of color were pushed to the side of the male-dominated organizations in charge. These women of color became exasperated by fighting battles behind black men and white women who did not support their social and political issues. The disregard for intersectional issues led women of color, particularly black women in the beginning, to break off creating organizations of their own. These groups were formed due to inadequate acceptance in white feminist spaces and the dismissal of women's issues in the black movements of the time. Through this lack of representation, the TWWA was born.

Initially, the TWWA was known as the Black Women's Liberation Committee (BWLC) and was created by black women within the Student Nonviolent Coordinating Committee (SNCC), including Frances Beal, in 1968. The BWLC then became the Black Women's Alliance (BWA) when it became independent from SNCC. The BWA approached the problems that black women were facing with an intersectional lens. They focused on the fact that they experienced different oppression than black men because of their intersectional identity. The BWA found that other women of color, specifically Puerto Rican women, were experiencing this oppression, later coined "triple jeopardy." The BWA was finally transformed in 1970, and the Third World Women's Alliance was officially established. The organization reshaped its vision for its activism and coined the TWWA name. The move to the TWWA was pursued because of the group's direct work with Puerto Rican feminists and the Chicana Movement. The TWWA had West and East Coast branches that focused on different activities and components of the third-world feminist movement.

== Objectives and involvement ==
The objectives of the TWWA and the white feminist movement differed significantly. The TWWA worked to widen what rights women were fighting for and gave women space to push political action. The TWWA was notably a part of many demonstrations and movements at the time, and it was documented thoroughly as a voice for women worldwide. One of the uniting factors of the TWWA was the idea of unity through difference. Women came from different backgrounds but shared their struggles of compounding oppression.

TWWA was the cornerstone of intersectional feminist organizations and bolstered third-world feminist theory, particularly through cofounder Frances Beal. Her pamphlet, Double Jeopardy: To Be Black and Female, notably added to the work of the TWWA. This work and other work of the TWWA fought against the prior notion that oppression was felt the greatest through sexism. Oppression internationally was a combination of factors such as race, class, and sex.

The TWWA participated in many marches and demonstrations, even sending a delegation to the United Nations' World Conference on Women in 1975. One of the most notable demonstrations they participated in was the Women's Strike for Equality march because of the barrier to entry they faced. This march was held in 1970 and was one of the largest equal rights demonstrations to date. It resulted from a call to action by Betty Friedan and was attended by over 50,000 women. Every kind of feminist group was represented and stood together, even if their values differed. The TWWA went to march alongside all the different factions of the feminist movement and were turned away because they carried a banner with the phrase "Free Angela Davis." The parade coordinator told them that they were not allowed to march because their message and ideals did not belong among the feminist groups in the march. Angela Davis was a symbol for the TWWA because of her focus on the fight against oppression based on race, sex, and class. This refusal of entry was a clear sign of racism within the mainstream movement. The TWWA understood that many leaps had been made toward women's rights, but also saw the intersectional issues facing third-world women.

== Triple Jeopardy newspaper ==
In 1971, the New York chapter began publishing the TWWA newspaper Triple Jeopardy, to stress the ideological connections between capitalist exploitation, global imperialism, and the oppression of women of color. The first issue of Triple Jeopardy asserted that "the struggle against racism and imperialism must be waged simultaneously with the struggle for women's liberation" by "a strong independent socialist women's group."

Each newspaper cover was printed with the title Triple Jeopardy: Racism, Imperialism, Sexism and included the TWWA emblem of the Venus symbol with a rifle piercing through it. The newspapers were put out monthly to raise awareness for problems such as sterilization abuse of Chicana women, colonialism in Puerto Rico, labor unionization, mass incarceration, and many other intersectional issues. The newspaper issues contained articles, images, poetry, and a "news brief" highlighting important current events. Along with their third-world vision, each issue had articles in English and Spanish. In the same issue, some articles were printed twice, in both languages. This inclusion of bilingual text ensured that more women could access and learn from the information presented.
