= Catherine E. Harnois =

Quantitative sociologist

Catherine E. Harnois is an American sociologist whose research focuses on sociological methodology and social inequality, including discrimination and health disparities. She is Professor and former Chair of the Department of Sociology at Wake Forest University.

In 2012, she received the Outstanding Contribution to Scholarship Article Award from the American Sociological Association Section on Race, Gender, and Class.

== Select publications ==
- Kenneavy, Kristin; Harnois, Catherine E.; Atkinson, Maxine P.; Odell Korgen, Kathleen, eds. (2022). Social Research Methods: Sociology in Action. Sage Publications. ISBN 9781544373935.
- Harnois, Catherine E. (2017). Analyzing Inequalities: An Introduction to Race, Class, Gender, and Sexuality Using the General Social Survey. Sage Publications. ISBN 9781506304113.
- Harnois, Catherine E. (2012). Feminist Measures in Survey Research. Sage Publications. ISBN 9781412988353.
