= Matrix of domination =

Sociological paradigm

The matrix of domination or matrix of oppression is a sociological paradigm that explains issues of oppression that deal with race, class, and gender, which, though recognized as different social classifications, are all interconnected. This theory also applies to other forms of classification, such as sexual orientation, religion, or age. Patricia Hill Collins is credited with introducing the theory in her work entitled Black Feminist Thought: Knowledge, Consciousness, and the Politics of Empowerment.

As the term implies, there are many different ways one might experience domination, facing many different challenges in which one obstacle, such as race, may overlap with other sociological features. Characteristics such as race, age, and sex, may intersectionally affect an individual in extremely different ways, in such simple cases as varying geography, socioeconomic status, or simply throughout time. Other scholars' work, such as Kimberlé Crenshaw's Mapping the Margins: Intersectionality, Identity Politics, and Violence against Women of Color, are credited with expanding Collins' work. The matrix of domination is a way for people to acknowledge their privileges in society. How one is able to interact, what social groups one is in, and the networks one establishes are all based on different interconnected classifications.

== Theory applied ==
Though Collins' main focus of the theory of the matrix of domination was applied to African-American women, there are many other examples that can be used to illustrate the theory. Other examples include Log Cabin Republicans, female criminality, and African-American Muslim women. One of the key concepts of the matrix of domination is that the different categories, like race and gender, are separate groups, rather than a combination. This is a problem that can be seen in the law as well when it comes to discrimination because the courts fail to view discrimination as an overarching umbrella of intersectionality.

A way in which the matrix of domination works with regards to privilege can be if two people all have the same classification, except one person has an education and one does not have as high of an education. Their gender, race, sexuality, educational attainment all intersect to identify who they are. However, compared to other people one classification can point out privilege and, in turn, open more opportunities for one individual over the other.

One of the main aspects of the matrix of domination is the fact that one may be privileged in one area, yet they can be oppressed in a different aspect of their identity. Some people believe that racial discrimination is on its way to being eradicated from the United States when they look as people like Colin Powell, a very successful, African-American, middle-aged man. Although Powell obtains the characteristics of a person that may not face oppression (upper-class, middle-aged, male), he is still discriminated against because of his race. This shows one of the key components of the matrix of domination; the idea that one cannot look at the individual facets of someone's identity, but rather that they are all interconnected.

== Matrix of domination compared to intersectionality ==
=== Historical background on the matrix of domination ===
In Collins' Black Feminist Thought: Knowledge, Consciousness, and the Politics of Empowerment, she first describes the concept of matrix thinking within the context of how black women in America encounter institutional discrimination based upon their race and gender. A prominent example of this in the 1990s was racial segregation, especially as it related to housing, education, and employment. At the time, there was very little encouraged interaction between whites and blacks in these common sectors of society. Collins argues that this demonstrates how being black and female in America continues to perpetuate certain common experiences for African-American women. As such, African-American women live in a different world than those who are not black and female. Collins notes how this shared social struggle can actually result in the formation of a group-based collective effort, citing how the high concentration of African-American women in the domestic labor sector in combination with racial segregation in housing and schooling contributed directly to the organization of the black feminist movement. The collective wisdom shared by black women that held these specific experiences constituted a distinct viewpoint for African-American women concerning correlations between their race and gender and the resulting economic consequences.

Moolman points out the main issue concerning matrix thinking is how one accounts for the power dynamics between varying identifying categories that are ingrained in both oppression and domination instead of the traditional approach, reducing experiences to a single identity. For instance, black women's experiences with society are used to illustrate how even though white scholars have attempted to use intersectionality in their research, they may still be inclined to default towards single-identity thinking that often fails to address all aspects of black women's experiences, thus ignoring the organization the matrix objectively offers.

The matrix of domination in the colonial era and white society has also been carefully examined. The societal hierarchy determined by race and implemented under apartheid locates different racial populations in regards to their privilege, with African Americans usually at the bottom of the ladder. Dhamoon argues that on a global scale, the spot occupied by African Americans in such context is interchangeable with indigenous populations, as marginalized peoples are systematically working both within and across a matrix of interrelated axes of "penalty and privilege". The interconnectivity of different identities in regards to power in racial structures in post-colonial era societies help illustrate what changes make a difference. The framework setup of the matrix of domination connects its origin theory and thought to existing struggles in the political and social spheres of society. A closer look at both specific and broader aspects of matrix thought will shed more light on the inner-workings and mechanisms that determine how different relationship dynamics influence matrix categorizations.

May cites that an important implication that matrix thinking inspires is that it directly goes against what is often described as the socially inclusive ‘add and stir’ approach. This is often used when describing the addition of one or more identity group to existing epistemological approaches, political strategies or research methodologies. This accounts for the proper weighing of power dynamics and their impact on different groups of people. Intersectionality centers power in a multi-pronged way as shifting across different sites and scales at the same time. Therefore, it is not neutral but evolved out of histories of struggle that pursue multidimensional forms of justice.

=== Historical background on intersectionality ===
Kimberlé Crenshaw, the founder of the term "intersectionality", brought national and scholarly credential to the term through the paper Demarginalizing the Intersection of Race and Sex: A Black Feminist Critique of Antidiscrimination Doctrine, Feminist Theory and Antiracist Politics in The University of Chicago Legal Forum. In the paper, she uses intersectionality to reveal how feminist movements and antiracist movements exclude women of color. Focusing on the experiences of Black women, she dissects several court cases, influential pieces of literature, personal experiences, and doctrinal manifestations as evidence for the way Black women are oppressed through many different experiences, systems and groups.

Though the specifics differ, the basic argument is the same: Black women are oppressed in a multitude of situations because people are unable to see how their identities intersect and influence each other. Feminism has been crafted for white middle-class women, only considering problems that affect this group of people. Unfortunately, this only captures a small facet of the oppression women face. By catering to the most privileged women and addressing only the problems they face, feminism alienates women of color and lower-class women by refusing to accept the way other forms of oppression feed into the sexism they face. Not only does feminism completely disregard the experiences of women of color, it also solidifies the connection between womanhood and whiteness when feminists speak for "all women". Oppression cannot be detangled or separated easily in the same way identities cannot be separated easily. It is impossible to address the problem of sexism without addressing racism, as many women experience both racism and sexism. This theory can also be applied to the antiracist movement, which rarely addresses the problem of sexism, even though it is thoroughly intertwined with the problem of racism. Feminism remains white, and antiracism remains male. In essence, any theory that tries to measure the extent and manner of oppression Black women face will be wholly incorrect without using intersectionality.

Patricia Hill Collins wrote a book titled Black Feminist Thought: Knowledge, Consciousness and the Politics of Empowerment, which articulated "Black Feminist Thought" in relation to intersectionality with a focus on the plight of Black women in face of the world, the white feminist movement, and the male antiracism movement. Collins references Crenshaw's concept of intersectionality and relates it to the matrix of domination, "The term matrix of domination describes this overall social organization within which intersecting oppressions originate, develop, and are contained.".

=== Intersectionality and the matrix of domination ===
Both intersectionality and the matrix of domination help sociologists understand power relationships and systems of oppression in society. The matrix of domination looks at the overall organization of power in society while intersectionality is used to understand a specific social location of an identity using mutually constructing features of oppression.

The concept of intersectionality today is used to move away from one dimensional thinking in the matrix of domination approach by allowing for different power dynamics of different identity categories at the same time. Researchers in public health are using Intersectionality-Based Policy Analysis (IBPA) Framework to show how social categories intersect to identify health disparities that evolve from factors beyond an individual's personal health. Ferlatte applied an IBPA framework and used structural interviews to identify barriers to the allocation of HIV prevention funding for gay men. He highlighted policy more likely to cause harm than reduce the epidemic stemming from policy makers missing the "intersections of oppression, sex panic, and medicalization".

Intersectionality can also be used to correct for the over-attribution of traits to groups and be used to emphasize unique experiences within a group. As a result, the field of social work is introducing intersectional approaches in their research and client interactions. At the University of Arkansas, the curriculum for a Master of Social Work (MSW) is being amended to include the Multi-Systems Life Course (MSLC) approach. Christy and Valandra apply an MSLC approach to intimate partner violence and economic abuse against poor women of color to explain that symbols of safety (such as police) in one population can be symbols of oppression in another. By teaching this approach to future social workers, the default recommendation for these women to file a police report is amended and an intervention rooted in the individual case can emerge.

== Implications of the matrix of domination ==
Many approaches have been used that consider the concepts of identity, societal structures, and representation to be mutually exclusive, but the introduction of Patricia Hill Collins’ matrix of domination addresses the interlocking patterns of privilege and marginalization along the lines of race, class, gender, and class inside social institutions as well as at the community level. With this work has come greater recognition of the various effects that each identity holds in different societal contexts, in both the micro- and macro-level structures within the systems of oppression that exist.

=== In female criminality ===
In April Bernard's article, "The Intersectional Alternative: Explaining Female Criminality", Bernard applies Patricia Hill Collins’ work to the study of feminist criminology, as a means of explaining the cumulative effects of identity in a system of oppression on women's decisions to commit a crime. Bernard employs an intersectional approach to dissect the complexities that act as determinant factors in a woman's decision to partake in criminal activities, and more specifically, the limiting pressures of a patriarchal society. In particular, this article is framed in response to Robert Merton's claims about deviance as a response to a lack of adequate resources to achieve cultural goals, as Bernard employs an intersectional paradigm model that explores female criminality as an expression of constraint and circumscription, rather than a "strained reality". With this alternative framework, Bernard suggests that societal goals are not unanimous, and are instead shaped by individuals’ experiences in economic, political, and social spaces; for marginalized women, access to the means through which they build success are impacted by micro- and macro-level norms and histories that have created indicators of class (e.g. racial, economic, political, sexual) and subjugated them to limited networks. Thus, identity makes women with marginalized identities more vulnerable in the legal system, subjugates to oppressive states within multiple institutions, and creating a need for policies that move toward creating an equitable reality for them.

Nancy A. Heitzeg's article, "'Whiteness', criminality, and double standards of deviance/social control" focuses on the construct of white racial framing and the impact that has on constructing Blackness with criminality. In doing so Heitzeg speaks on the methods of social control, placed on those who are deviant from the norm of society. Mechanisms of social control find themselves helping to categorize those who are not cis-gendered and white as the "Other". Heitzeg, using Patricia Hill Collin's "matrix of domination" explores how shapes access to social control as well as opportunity. Deviating from the social control base that finds itself at the intersections of race, gender, and class among other differences helps to solidify who is categorized as the "Other".

Markers associated with race, class, gender, etc., argues Heitzeg allows for stereotypes that allows for mitigation of a "redeemable" white middle class and criminalization for poor Black people and other people of color. White racial framing creates a space for constructing storylines of white deviance, simultaneously creating storylines of Black criminality. This extends itself to the "medicalization" of whiteness, allowing for racial framing around whiteness to allow for associations of purity and redeem-ability. The opposite is imposed upon Black people. The identifiers associated with whiteness and Blackness allow for a framework in which subjects Blackness to something that is accepted as criminal.

In the context of criminality, the Matrix of Domination, may best present itself in the statistics:

Currently the number of women imprisoned in the United States is more than one million, making them the fastest growing population in the prison industrial complex. The number of women in prison has massively increased from statistics found in the 1980s, more than eight times as many women have been reported to be either in prison, or are at the control of the criminal justice system.

Within these numbers, Black and brown women are an overrepresented population. Black women represented roughly thirty percent of the prison population while only representing thirteen percent of the female population in the United States. In addition, Hispanic women currently make up roughly sixteen percent of the prison population, while only making up eleven percent of the female population in the United States.

The facts surrounding the cases for Black and brown women who are incarcerated show a pattern of these women being from urban areas, with an emphasis on their alleged crimes being ones of involvement or association, as opposed to being the sole perpetrator. Scholars have attributed these numbers to the over-policing of these neighborhoods in which house an almost exclusively minority population. Other attributes come from the variations in arrest and sentencing policies and practices, prison expansions, especially with for profit prisons being on the rise.

=== In the welfare state ===
In the United States, especially, the matrix of domination has implications within the welfare state. Several sociological studies on the welfare state take note of state-market relations while ignoring the salient roles held by other identities such as gender, race, class, language, and age, among others. Due to the nature of the welfare state, there has not been much regard for exploring the existence of multiple axes of oppression which has led to lineation of categories of race, class, and gender. In Politics, Gender, and Concepts, Gary Goertz and Amy Mazur assert that literature about the welfare state should focus on the relationship between social positions and social policies, as well as provide a framework for investigations into the causal effects of class, gender, and race. As such, using the idea of a matrix of domination in these kinds of studies provides a basis for empirical research on the relationship between social positions and policies, and also, for a comparison between the outcomes of social policies on marginalized and privileged women.

== Intersectionality of gender and class ==
=== Benefits among class ===
The benefits that upper-class citizens receive from their employer are far different from that of working-class employees. This is due to the upper class taking jobs that give them a higher status or position, whereas the working class take jobs with lower status such as retail and blue-collar jobs. The most obvious benefit that differs between classes is the amount of money made. Upper-class workers receive significantly more pay than the working class, and while the upper class receive salaries, the lower class typically receive their pay based on hourly wages. Moreover, the chance of getting a raise is greater for the higher-ups. More benefits that the upper class enjoy over the working class are vacation time, flexible hours, retirement savings, and greater coverage of healthcare and insurance.

=== Benefits among gender ===
When it comes to workplace benefits such as health insurance coverage, pensions, sick leave, and disability plans, there are gender differences in whether or not these benefits are offered. Women are less likely to be offered pensions, health coverage and disability plans. In fact, high poverty rates among elderly women have been linked to lack of pension coverage. Additionally, many female heads of household remain on welfare because they cannot find jobs with adequate health insurance coverage. When it comes to union contracts, men are also twice as likely to be covered. This gender gap in benefits coverage may be due to the fact that women tend to have higher medical expenditures than males of the same age. As a result, some of the observed gap in wages between males and females in the United States could be the result of employers compensating for the higher cost of employer-sponsored health insurance. This further perpetuates gender discrimination because it means that firms who offer ESI (Employer Sponsored Insurance) will prefer to hire males. Another effect of women generally having greater healthcare expenses than men is that they are likely to place a higher value on insurance and be more inclined to pass up jobs for insurance-related reasons. This lowers the probability of obtaining jobs that pay higher wages directly and decrease a woman's bargaining power with her current employer. Indeed, health insurance has a larger (negative) effect on the job mobility of women, which they attribute to women's elevated healthcare expenses.

=== Wage gap among class ===
In the United States there is an unequal distribution of income between social classes for multiple reasons. Level of education has a great influence on average salaries. The higher the socioeconomic status (SES) of an individual the more likely they are to graduate from high school and potentially obtain a college degree, which in return increases their chances of a larger salary. The average salary of an individual with a high school diploma is about $35,000, but increases to about $60,000 by obtaining a bachelor's degree after. The gap in salary increases with each additional level of education received. Those in the lower class face more obstacles and have less opportunities to pursue additional education due to their lack of resources. The wage gap is even larger for individuals affected by poverty and racial barriers. Whites have a median income of about $71,000 while blacks have a median income of about $43,000. Statistics show that blacks make up 16% of public high school graduates, 14% of those enrolling in college, and only 9% of those receiving a bachelor's degree. At the same time, whites make up 59%, 58%, and 69%, respectively. That is a 61% difference between blacks not obtaining a bachelor's degree and whites graduating with one. Individuals in poverty already face a disadvantage in obtaining the same level of income as their upper class coworkers, but when also affected by racial barriers the chances of reaching the same income are even fewer.

=== Wage gap among gender ===
There is definitely intersectionality and inequality with women and men when it comes to wage gaps. Careers that pay well are often male dominated, and do not tolerate women and their personal needs. There has been a stable "pay gap" between men and women which has remained between 10–20% difference in their average earnings. (Women, careers and work life preferences). When discussing wage gaps between genders, scientists takes into account two questions, the first being "is there differential access jobs on the basis of gender?" and the second being, "is women’s work perceived to have less value than comparable work done by men?". When women begin to increase their numbers in certain job positions the status or value of the job decreases. Conceptualizing intersectionality through class, gender and race then identifying the barriers that create inequality in Work organizations is found in the idea of "inequality regimes". Workplaces are prominent locations to analyze the continuous efforts of inequalities because many societal inequality issues stem in such areas. In the works of Inequality Regimes: Gender, Class, and Race in Organizations, inequality in gender, race, class are examined through intersectionality in organizations. Joane Acker discussed Inequality Regimes: Gender, Class, and Race in Organizations in Sociologists for Women in Society Feminists Lecture through studies conducted using Swedish Bank. Studies have shown in the 1980s depict that wage gaps were increasing between genders. Men were being rewarded the higher paying positions such as local managers, and believed fair wages for men should be higher than fair wages for women.

=== Representation among class ===
Social class plays a large role on people's everyday life, yet their representation is not always fair. In television and popular culture, those who fall into the lower class are often portrayed differently based on if they are a woman or a man. If they are a woman, they often are portrayed as being more intelligent and responsible than their husbands, almost acting as their mothers. The male head of the household is typically portrayed as being less intelligent, with some redeeming qualities, but typically is not respected. Together they can be shown in a light that makes them seem lazy or dishonest. The upper class however, does not face these same issues with representation in the media. The man of the household takes on stereotypical male qualities, while the woman takes on stereotypical female qualities. The children in this upper class scenario are what provides entertainment value, rather than focusing on the unintelligent and unorganized adults as in the lower class model. Overall, in the upper-class family unit, they are portrayed as organized and put together, while the lower class model are portrayed as lazy and unorganized.

=== Representation among gender ===
Whether one is a manager of a fast food restaurant or the CEO of a Fortune 500 company, authority is power and power is advantage. But just like the widespread power struggle, there is a widespread equality struggle. One of the largest workplace and societal inequalities is the inequality between genders. A prime example of this is the wage gap. Women in 2016 earned, on average, 82 cents to a man's dollar. This unequal pay is part of the reason that many women are the ones to leave the workforce when it is determined that a stay-at-home parent is required; if women are contributing less to the household income, it will make less of an impact if they quit their jobs. Women are also not granted the same opportunities for employment as men. A clear example is the U.S. military. Women were banned from all combat roles until recently. In 2011, only 14 percent of the armed forces were female, and only 14 percent of officers were female. Another example is the U.S. congress. In 2015, 80 percent of the Senate was male, and only 20 was female. This numbers were similar for the House, at 80.6 percent male and 19.4 percent female. The gender composition of the military and the government, along with the wage gap, shines a lights on the gender inequality experienced right here at home, but this inequality is more greatly felt abroad. Some countries place strict limitations on women, not allowing them to vote or work or even drive a car. While the U.S. is seen as a country of dreams and opportunity, is far easier to see this when compared to an even more unequal country. The United States has been trending toward gender equality in recent years, but it has a while to go.

=== Research contributions ===
An article found in the November 1998 issue of Social Problems details the conflict involving racial domination by identifying the complexity African-Americans face. In many cases, sociologists and laypersons alike are often limited in their approach to the problem. Michelle Byng, in "Mediating Discrimination: Oppression among African-American Muslim Women"—the 1998 article—brings to focus new approaches to understanding discrimination, but also, she writes to illustrate the many overlooked opportunities in which the discriminated are able to empower themselves in certain situations.

== Intersectionality in court cases ==
There are certain cases that are widely cited in discussing intersectional discrimination.

In DeGraffenreid vs. General Motors Emma DeGraffenreid and four other black female production workers were laid off, and took it to court claiming that the company was violating Title VII of the Civil Rights Act of 1964 because, "it perpetrated past discriminatory practices of not hiring Black females." The court looked at each of the categories, race and gender, separately therefore they missed the discrimination of a person being both African-American and female. "It was argued, black women can expect little protection as long as approaches, such as that in DeGraffenreid, which completely obscure problems of intersectionality prevail."

Another case, Maivan Lam v. University of Hawai'i, where intersectionality was the core reason behind the problem that emerged. Maivan Lam was not offered a job twice when she applied to be the director of the Law School's Pacific Asian Legal Studies Program. Two times, the university was looking for a director, and when the final offer came around, and she was the best candidate available, the university simply cancelled their search. In the first search, Professor Lam made it to the final round, but was not offered the job before the whole search was simply shut down. The second time, the position was offered to another candidate and the other candidate refused to accept, the search was simply cancelled without it being offered to Professor Lam. When Lam brought this situation up to the Dean, he suggested reopening the search so that male candidates who had not applied on time could submit their applications. It is stated, "Early in the 1989-90 academic year, the new appointments committee reviewed applications for a commercial law position. At one meeting, a male committee member stated that the Law School should not have two women teaching commercial law. This comment was reported to the Dean, who said that he recognized that the professor had difficulty dealing with women but took no action to remove him from the committee or otherwise to remedy the problem.". There was clear intersectionality, as Professor Lam was not only arguing regards to race but also how her gender affected her position.

In the case, Jefferies v. Harris County Community Action Association, April 21, 1980, Dafro M. Jefferies claimed that her former employer failed to promote her to a higher position because of her race and sex. In 1967 she was employed by Harris County Community Action Association as a secretary to the director of programs. She was later promoted to personal interviewer in 1970. Everything seemed to be moving in a positive direction for her. However, between 1971 and April 1974, Jefferies applied for promotions in various positions and departments without any luck. She realized that her employer was discriminating against her when two field representative positions opened. Jefferies immediately applied. However, the positions were already staffed by a white woman and black man the same day that she was told about the vacant position. The company had purposefully told her about the open positions, knowing that they were already filled. After several complaints to the company, on April 23, 1974 Jefferies was placed on probation. In June 1974, she was terminated from the job because she had called the company out for discriminating against her because of her race and sex. There was clear evidence of intersectionality in this case, she argued; she was not promoted to a higher position because she was both black and a female. However, the court ultimately disagreed with her, insofar as there existed zero concrete evidence to support her case.

== See also ==
- Black feminism
- Intersectionality
- Kyriarchy
- Multiple jeopardy
- Triple oppression
