= Frances M. Beal =

American activist

- Born: January 13, 1940 (age 86); Binghamton, New York, U.S.
- Occupation: activist

Frances M. Beal, also known as Fran Beal, (born January 13, 1940, in Binghamton, New York) is a Black feminist and a peace and justice political activist. Her focus has predominantly been regarding women's rights, racial justice, anti-war and peace work, as well as international solidarity. Beal was a founding member of the SNCC Black Women's Liberation Committee, which later evolved into the Third World Women's Alliance. She is most widely known for her publication, “Double Jeopardy: To Be Black and Female", which theorizes the intersection of oppression between race, class, and gender. Beal currently lives in Oakland, California.

== Early life ==
Beal was born in Binghamton, NY, to Charlotte Berman Yates and Ernest Yates. Beal's mother, Charlotte Berman Yates, was born in the United States to radical, Russian-Jewish immigrants who fled Russia after rebelling against the anti-Semitic Russian Czar. Beal's father, Ernest Yates, was a Black-Native American who graduated from Syracuse University with a degree in Civil Engineering. After moving back to Binghamton, Beal's father experienced segregation and racism, unable to land an engineering-related job and eventually becoming a truck driver for the rest of his life.

Beal describes her upbringing as difficult, but acknowledges its impact on shaping her political consciousness. As a child, she negotiated her parents' controversial political activism with the need to belong. In an interview she confesses: "I can remember as a child being embarrassed. Why does my mother have to do this?” stating "you don't want your parents to be different from everybody else; on another level, you're learning about injustice." Her mother taught her that she had a personal and political social responsibility to confront inequalities that she and others are subjected to. In Binghamton, Beal's mother hosted Marxism Leninism study groups, against the wishes of the conservative, White majority in the town. Having a background with progressive parents introduced her to the injustices in the world. She ultimately harnessed her feelings of displacement into trying to be the best at everything, transforming her discomfort into political activism, following after her parents.

After her father's death, she moved to St. Albans, an integrated neighborhood in Queens.

When Beal was fifteen, fourteen-year old Emmett Till - originally from Chicago - was murdered in Mississippi. Beal greatly identified with Till and this event motivated her to pursue social activism.

Student Nonviolent Coordinating Committee logo

In 1958, Beal graduated from Andrew Jackson High School and attended the University of Wisconsin. There, she engaged in civil rights activities and socialist politics. During her sophomore year, Beal went abroad to France, where she engaged in Communist politics and married James Beal and had two children. Beal and her husband lived in France from 1959 to 1966 as she attended the Sorbonne. In Sorbonne, Beal explored left-wing ideology through local bookstores and interactions with the Algerian National Liberation Front (FLN). In 1965, Beal organized for Malcolm X to visit Paris and lead a discussion on Pan-Africanism and internationalism. After six years of marriage, they returned to the States and started working with SNCC (Student Nonviolent Coordinating Committee). Beal became aware of the fight to end the colonial domination in Algeria while studying abroad at the University of Sorbonne, which sparked her political consciousness and interest in social justice.

== Political organizing ==
In 1958, Beal began work in political activism with the University of Wisconsin NAACP, as vice president, where she ran into conservative restrictions that discouraged her from American politics. Inspired by a guess lecturer from the SNCC, Beal and the rest of the University of Wisconsin NAACP staged a peaceful demonstration outside a Woolworth's near the college to demonstrate solidarity with the SNCC Civil Rights Sit-In movement in the South. After pushback from the adult chapter of the NAACP, Beal took a step back from political activism.

Beal formally reengaged with political organizing by joining the SNCC during the Civil Rights Movement. During her time there, SNCC activities shifted toward a male-dominated Black Power. Beal and her female colleagues worked in and contributed to the organization, but were not recognized for leadership positions. While patriarchy influenced SNCC's organizing, race singularly became the primary issue that was addressed. Compounded with her concerns over women's rights, Beal became involved with the Women's Movement. Due to women's inferior positions within male-dominated organizations like the SNCC, she co-founded the Black Women's Liberation Committee of SNCC in 1968, alongside Mae Jackson and Gwendolyn Patton. Beal aired her grievances in the film She's Beautiful When She's Angry, stating,

“I was in the Student Nonviolent Coordinating Committee. You're talking about liberation and freedom half the night on the racial side, and then all of a sudden men are going to turn around and start talking about putting you in your place. So in 1968 we founded the SNCC Black Women's Liberation Committee to take up some of these issues.”

The Black Women's Liberation Committee of SNCC shifted into the and eventually evolved into the Third World Women's Alliance in 1969 with the admittance of Puerto Rican women into the organization. The TWWA is a NYC-based organization committed to helping marginalized women and communities globally in the struggle for social justice. The organization built off Marxist and Nationalist oriented framework. The TWWA incorporates a core stance of intersectionality politics, acknowledging oppression from the overlapping fronts of race, class, gender, capitalism, imperialism, and ability.

While working in the SNCC, Beal and her colleagues became increasing concerned about female issues, specifically assault on Black women's reproductive justice through forced sterilization. For Beal, reproductive justice was deeply personal as Beal's friend from high school died from a backstreet abortion. She was actively involved in CESA, the Committee to End Sterilization Abuse. This organization fought to help poor women of color who were being disproportionately targeted and coerced into involuntary sterilization get reproductive justice.

After leaving SNCC, Beal actively traveled the country and worked to organize and empower Black women through her political involvement on the National Council of Negro Women and her work through the Project Woman Power. Beal also published the National Council of Negro Women's newsletter: The Black Woman. In 1969, Beal composed an essay that addressed the complex relations Black women were facing in their collective Black struggle, called "Double Jeopardy: To Be Black and Female". In this essay, Beal critiques capitalism, reproductive rights, and social politicization, while acknowledging the unique position Black Women are in, in a monist society. This document became the SNCC's official stance on women. This publication was a part of a history of Black feminist organizing, where her work “coincided with other essays exploring the intersections of race and gender in Black women's lives, and more specifically, the political agency of African American women".

She was also a member of the National Anti-Racist Organizing Committee, which focused on anti-racist politics and centered around national organizing.

Through her organizing, Beal confronted a range of oppressive regimes that encompassed complex power relations which subordinated and disenfranchised Black women in particular. Her political organizing sought to address structural inequalities and empower marginalized groups.

== Journalism ==
Aside from her involvement in organizations, Beal maintained a career as a writer and editor. She was an associate editor of The Black Scholar and reported for the San Francisco Bay View. Beal also was an editor of the TWWA's newspaper, Triple Jeopardy, The Black Woman's Voice for the National Council of Negro Women, and a contributing editor to the Line of March, a Marxist–Leninist Theoretical Journal.

== Publications ==
Beal wrote an essay called "Slave of A Slave No More: Black Women in Struggle", which was published in 1975 and appears in the 6th issue of The Black Scholar. This essay addressed chauvinist attitudes of Black men that were predominant during the Civil Rights era. She argues that Black women have been subjected to additive exploitation and oppression because their Black brothers maintain gendered ideologies in what should be a collective fight for social justice.

In 1969, she published "Black Women's Manifesto; Double Jeopardy: To Be Black and Female". She describes the nature of African-American women's unique oppression within sexist and racist orders and prescribes Black women's agency. That pamphlet was later revised and then published in The Black Woman, an anthology edited by Toni Cade Bambara in 1970. A revised version of "Double Jeopardy: To Be Black and Female" also appears in the 1970 anthology Sisterhood is Powerful: An Anthology of Writings From The Women's Liberation Movement, edited by Robin Morgan. It was featured in The Black Scholar in 1975.

In 2002, Beal wrote an article called “Frederick Douglass’ Legacy for Our Times”, in which she names the erasure of imperialist struggles that go overlooked on Independence Day and draws from Frederick Douglass to remind people "Freedom is a constant struggle."

Beal is featured in the 2013 historical documentary Feminist: Stories from Women's Liberation.

Most recently, in 2014, Beal was featured in the feminist history film She's Beautiful When She's Angry.

== Legacy ==
Fran Beal's work, particularly her essay Double Jeopardy: To Be Black and Female, is recognized as foundational to Black feminist thought and the concept of intersectionality. Her analysis of intersecting race and gender oppressions influenced later feminist theorists, such as Audre Lorde, Bell hooks, and Angela Davis, who expanded on her work to address the interconnected nature of identity and oppression. Beal's critique of mainstream feminism's limitations helped catalyze the formation of the Combahee River Collective, whose Combahee River Collective Statement further defined intersectional approaches to activism.

Kimberlé Crenshaw later formalized intersectionality, but acknowledged that Beal and other Black feminists laid the groundwork. Beal's advocacy through the TWWA extended her impact globally, connecting U.S. feminist activism with liberation movements in the Global South, promoting solidarity among women of color against imperialism and economic exploitation, and voicing on abortion rights and sterilization abuse. Her work remains influential in academic fields like gender studies and sociology, where Double Jeopardy is frequently referenced in discussions of intersectionality. Today, her legacy endures through feminist scholarship and activism that emphasizes multi-dimensional approaches to social justice.
