= Deborah G. King =

American temperance advocate, and suffragist (1839–1922)

Deborah G. King (née Akin; 1839–1922) was an American Women's Crusader, Prohibition advocate, and suffragist, who worked along all reform lines. She shared with her husband in all the pioneer experiences in Minnesota and she lived to witness almost the entire growth of Lincoln, Nebraska. In August 1886, King was elected National Inspector of the Woman's Relief Corps (WRC) at the national encampment of the Grand Army of the Republic (GAR) and WRC held at Portland, Maine, and later, at a national encampment held at Minneapolis, Minnesota. She advocated and had adopted, in spite of strong opposition, the measure providing that eligibility to the WRC be broadened to include all loyal women instead of relatives of soldiers only, as was then the case. In 1896, King founded and was the first President of the Woman's Bimetallic League, which advocated the silver standard and was, at the time, the only political organization for women in the U.S.

== Early life and education ==
Deborah G. Akin was born in Rensselaer County, New York, March 29, 1839. Her grandmother, Sarah (Holley) Akin, was a half-sister of General Lafayette. Her grandfather, Justice Akin, was a soldier in the War of 1812 and in the Mexican–American War.

She was educated in the schools of Troy, New York.

== Career ==
King was one of the original Crusaders in Lincoln, Nebraska — a party of thirteen — while her husband waas one of the group of men that stood on guard to see that no harm came to the women. She was a charter member of the Lincoln Woman's Christian Temperance Union (WCTU) and took active part in its meetings. She became a forceful speaker, and continued for many years to be in demand as a campaigner in various State contests, as well for equal suffrage as for Prohibition. Other interests — patriotic, social and religious— claimed much of her time. She was nearly always a delegate to the National WCTU conventions.

She was the second president of the WRC of Lincoln, and was a delegate to the national convention at Minneapolis. During the early days of the WRC, a question arose as to what limit should be placed upon the membership, whether only relatives of civil war soldiers should be eligible, or whether all loyal women should be admitted. Clara Barton was national president at the time, and favored only relatives of soldiers. King championed the idea that all loyal women should have the privileges of membership. She had only a small backing at first, but carried on the discussion for two days and two nights, when she won her point by a vote of 36 to 6. In August 1886, at Portland, Maine, King was elected National Inspector of the WRC, with the unanimous endorsement of the GAR. During that year, King inspected every WRC department in the U.S. She served as a member of the national board up to the time of her husband's severe illness.

In 1896, King suggested establishing a strictly political organization for women, and at her invitation, 327 women met in representative hall, at the Nebraska State Capitol, and organized the Woman's Bimetallic League, advocating the silver standard. King was unanimously elected the first president of this league, it being at the time the only political organization for women in the U.S. This band of women studied the money question, and political history generally, and were active in their support of the Boers in their war against England. At the time it disbanded, at the close of the campaign, it had a membership of 1,375.

She also served as vice-president for Nebraska of the National Woman Suffrage Association, with Lucy Stone as president. During this time, she attended all the national conventions.

King was for several years at the head of the county jail and prison work in Lincoln.

== Personal life ==
In 1858, she married Shepherd H. King, and later removed with him to Lincoln, Nebraska, where he became well known as a leading dentist, and more widely known as a Prohibition party official. The couple having no children of their own, adopted five young girls whom they reared as if their own.

King was reared in the Methodist church but both she and her husband were members of the Universalist church for years and Dr. King was president of the society as long as the organization existed in Lincoln, while she was chair of the board.

In politics, she was in sympathy with the Prohibition Party.

== Death ==
Deborah G. Akin King died March 8, 1922. She left two wills for her estate, bequests of both instruments differing altogether.
