= Triple oppression =

Theory developed by black socialists in the United States

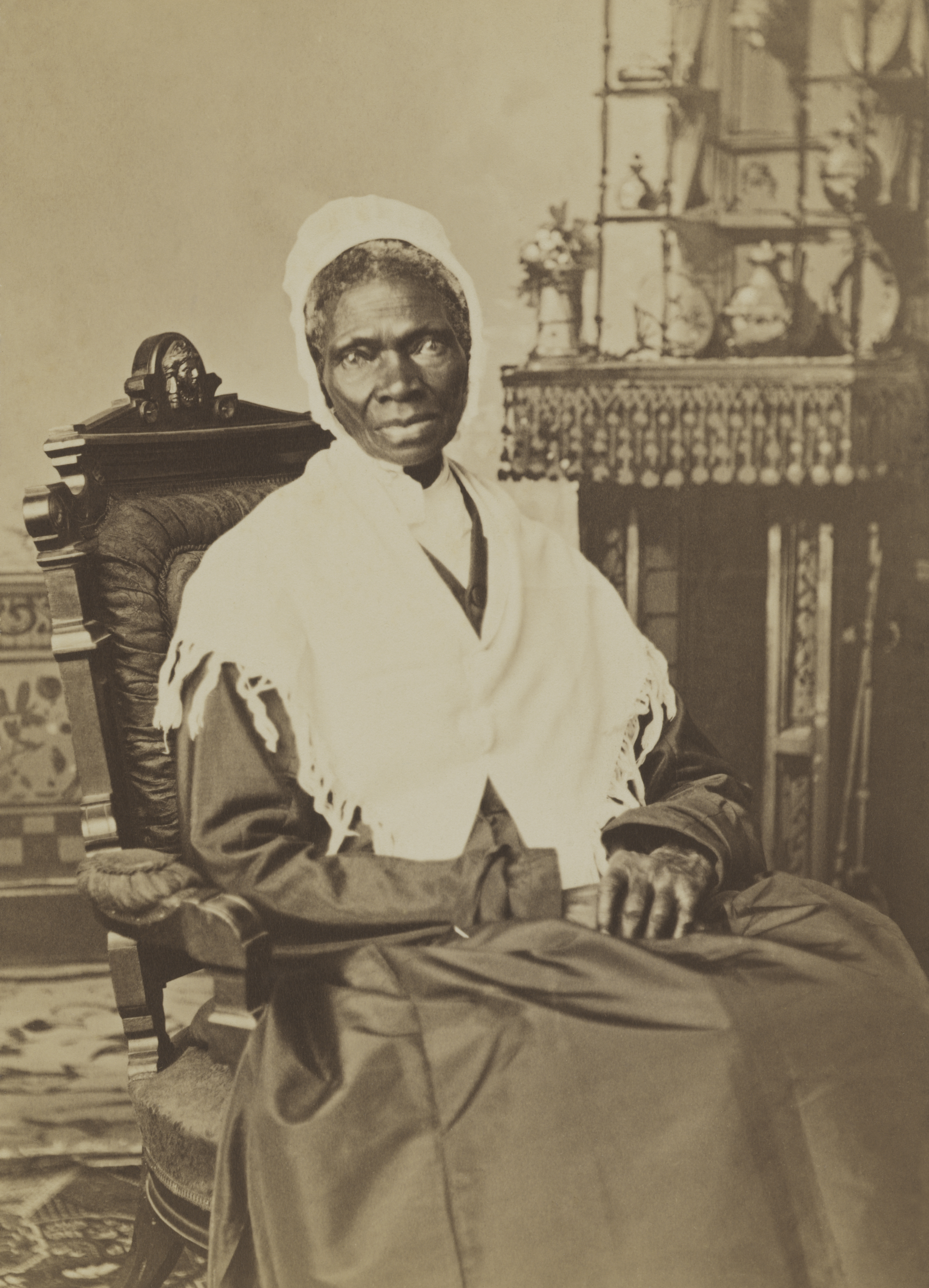
Sojourner Truth, 1870

Triple oppression, also called double jeopardy, Jane Crow, or triple exploitation, is a theory developed by black socialists in the United States, such as Claudia Jones. The theory states that a connection exists between various types of oppression, specifically classism, racism, and sexism. It hypothesizes that all three types of oppression need to be overcome at once.

== History ==
Before the term "triple oppression" was coined, Black female scholars in the 19th century highlighted the unique challenges faced by Black women due to the intersecting oppressions of race and gender. As an abolitionist, Sojourner Truth affirmed the struggles she faced as a result of both her race and gender. At the 1851 Women's Rights Convention in Akron, Ohio, Truth delivered a speech that would become one of the most iconic moments in the fight for both abolition and women's rights, titled “Ain’t I a Woman?” In her speech, Truth challenged the arguments that excluded women, especially Black women, from the fight for equality, emphasizing her strength and abilities against the stereotypes that belittled her. Truth also voiced opposition to the Fifteenth Amendment with the reasoning that more male power would lead to the greater oppression of black women. On May 9, 1867, during her speech at the First Annual Meeting of the American Equal Rights Association, she emphasized this point by stating, "if colored men get their rights, and not colored women theirs, you see the colored men will be masters over the women, and it will be just as bad as it was before."

Moreover, suffragist Elizabeth Cady Stanton stated that black women would suffer from a "triple bondage that man never knows" if they did not receive voting rights when colored men did. Anna Julia Cooper discussed black women's double enslavement through race and gender. Moreover, in 1904, activist Mary Church Terrell explored the unique discrimination faced by black women when she wrote about women of color's discrimination as a result of both their race and gender.

According to scholar Eric McDuffie, the term "triple exploitation" was coined in the 1930s by activist and Communist Party member Louise Thompson Patterson to describe the oppression pertaining to class, race, and gender suffered specifically by black women.

Triple oppression was popularized during a time of transition when the Old Left as a movement was rendered powerless post-World War II. Communism, although prominent in earlier years, reached its highest peak in the political atmosphere in the 1960s. The Communist party was made up of immigrant members and foreign and the various coalitions formerly associated with the Socialist Party of America; those workers, many of whom were not fluent English-speakers, made little effort to include Black Americans and their rights even when both mirrored each other. As the Socialist Party was rising, still little effort was made to include many African-American members. Although leaders often were committed against racial segregation, many in the Socialist Party didn't see the connection to racism and how it affected many in the United States. "Some African Americans dissatisfied by Socialist attitudes and their unwillingness to speak up about racial issues, joined the Communist party; others went to the African Blood Brotherhood (ABB), which was known for being a radical black liberation organization." The Communist Party's new concept introduced triple oppression focusing on Black women workers. This oppression is shown through, "The most privileged group members marginalizes those who are multiply-burdened and obscures claims that cannot be understood as resulting from discrete sources of discrimination." The party focused on the blatant issues of race, class, and gender while including intersectionality. After much frustration from black citizens and a reformulation of the Communist party, many African Americans joined the party to further the goal of equality. Eventually after World War I and II, the communist party underwent many splits that caused the party to get smaller and eventually disappear. Many groups came out of this, including militant power movements like the Black Panther movement.

=== Claudia Jones ===
Erik S. McDuffie credits communist Louise Thompson Patterson with coining the term "triple oppression," while Carole Boyce Davies argues that the concept of black women's triple oppression was popularized within the Communist Party by party member Claudia Jones. Jones's pivotal article critiquing the Party’s neglect of Black women synthesized her long-standing ideas on triple oppression.

Jones believed that black women's triple oppression based on race, class, and gender preceded all other forms of oppression. Additionally, she theorized that by freeing black women, who are the most oppressed of all people, freedom would be gained for all people who suffer from race, class, and gender oppression. Jones saw that the Communist Party focused on the oppression of the white working-class male, and she criticized the party's lack of recognition of the specific oppressions of black women in her article, "An End to the Neglect of the Problems of the Negro Woman" (1949).

Jones was sure to articulate a socialist feminism that took into account not just race, but the disparate struggles of all working women. Jones felt that black American women experienced a unique form of oppression that was not acknowledged by feminism. She argued that with the liberation of black women, black nationalism would be much more achievable. As she puts it, "once Negro women undertake action, the militancy of the whole Negro people, and thus of the anti-imperialist coalition is greatly enhanced."

Jones's views influenced other Communist women and black female activists, such as Angela Davis and the Combahee River Collective. Davis writes about triple oppression in her book Women, Race and Class (1981), where she identifies white socialist Elizabeth Gurley Flynn as articulating the concept of "triple jeopardy" in 1948, quoting this passage: "Every inequality and disability inflicted on American white women is aggravated a thousandfold among Negro women, who are triply exploited — as Negroes, as workers, and as women."

== Variations on Triple Oppression ==
=== Double Jeopardy by Frances Beal ===
Frances Beal introduced the term "double jeopardy" in her 1969 pamphlet, Double Jeopardy: To Be Black and Female. The term was coined to capture the unique dual oppressions faced by Black women, who were marginalized not only by racism but also by sexism. She argued that this dual oppression could not be fully understood by examining either race or gender alone. Instead, the intersection of these two identities created a distinct form of discrimination that mainstream feminist and civil rights movements overlooked.

While the primary focus of Beal's work is on the dual perspectives of oppression of racism and sexism, she also highlights that economic factors are crucial for understanding the overall impact of double jeopardy. She critiques capitalism, reproductive rights, and political socialization, as they exacerbate the challenges faced by Black women in various aspects of their lives, including employment, income, and access to resources.

==== Multiple Jeopardy: Beyond Double Jeopardy ====
According to Deborah K. King, racism, sexism, and classism are widely accepted as the major facets of the status of black women. King believes that double jeopardy and triple jeopardy do not fully explain the relationship between the different oppressions faced by black women. Thus, King coined the term "multiple jeopardy" in "Multiple Jeopardy, Multiple Consciousness: The Context of a Black Feminist Ideology." This concept addresses the limitations of double or triple jeopardy models, which view different forms of prejudice as additive. Instead, multiple jeopardy suggests that these prejudices are interdependent and have a multiplicative effect. As such, King believes that different oppressions interact with each other rather than acting independently.

King's theory of multiple jeopardy further expands this discussion by highlighting the interconnectedness of various forms of oppression, emphasizing the matrix of domination. By acknowledging the multiple consequences of homophobia and heterosexism for LGBTQ+ individuals, King's framework provides a deeper understanding of how these overlapping oppressions shape the experiences of marginalized groups.

==== Critiquing Double and Multiple Jeopardy ====
Jim Sidanius and colleagues have pointed out that while it is true that subordinate group women (e.g. black women) do experience both racism and sexism, racism tends to be primarily directed at subordinate group males (e.g. black men) and that the empirical evidence supports the idea that the worst outcomes are generally found in subordinate group males, not females as predicted by the double jeopardy hypothesis.

=== Jane Crow ===
Pauli Murray coined the term Jane Crow in 1947 to highlight that gender-based oppression, drawn from her own experiences at Howard University. Jane Crow was coined as a metaphor for the Jim Crow laws, which were state and local regulations enacted in the late 19th and early 20th centuries that enforced racial segregation and targeted African Americans.

While Jim Crow referred to race-based discrimination, Jane Crow highlighted the gender-based oppression that Black women faced, underscoring the dual challenges of racial and gender discrimination. Murray used this similarity of name between Jim Crow and Jane to emphasize that both had a similar harmful impact on Black women despite the differences in names, highlighting the intertwined nature of both forms of oppression.

== Intersectionality ==
Intersectionality is the sister of triple oppression while describing the various divisions of human beings. It deconstructs categories such as race, class, and gender. The idea of triple oppression dives into these different categories, race, class, and gender, by developing an understanding of how each works together often through injustices. Barbara Smith relates this combination by stating, "The concept of the simultaneity of oppression is still the crux of a Black feminist understanding of political reality and, I believe, one of the most significant ideological contributions of Black feminist thought." Both intersectionality and triple oppression show the neglect and subordination of many experiences of Black women and these played a vital role in the multitude of movements that prospered out of this.

=== Black women and Intersectionality ===
Black women experience triple oppression on a wide scale level, multiple scholars argue. Scholar Rajendra Chapagain in work titled " African American women, racism and triple oppression' discusses this, stating "to be Black and female is to suffer from triple oppression". Chapagain refers to sexism racism and classism.

The theory of intersectionality suggests that different aspects of a person's network and society puts them at either an advantage or disadvantage. It is able to explain many of the implications of various forms of oppression - including colonialism and slavery - on Black women in different facets of life. They experience oppression that are able to intersect, amplifying their impact. Coined by Kimberlé Crenshaw in 1989, its systematic nature is what many argue is the cause of such widespread misrepresentation. Her work on Intersectionality and Intersectional feminism discusses these overlapping systems. Research by Ntombenhle Torkington entitled 'Black migrant women and health' discusses how these forms have been able to infiltrate into the sector of health for Black women, noting how the correlation between oppression and treatment does exists. It also shows how because of it, they are at a clear disadvantage health wise.

This is able to be reflected in other areas of life, one of which being the class system and the exploitation of Black women in industries ranging vastly. This causes further repercussions including areas like income, access to communal resources and other societal privileges, as the theory reflects. Scholar Recep, in a reading of feminist literature through triple a oppression lens, describes this as the result of the "pursuit for power".

Feminist and African-American scholar Moya Bailey argues the systematic "hatred" of Black women is based on "simultaneous and interlocking oppression" in her book, 'What is Misogynoir?" Though mainly looking at the link between race and gender, the aspect of class is something that is able to become noteworthy due to its extended consequences. She discusses how the constant devaluing and commodification of Black women and their bodies is something that has long had an effect on the community.

== In various contexts ==
=== Political participation in South Africa ===
In "Gender, Social Location, and Feminist Politics in South Africa" (1991), Shireen Hassim discusses how triple oppression negatively affects South African women's participation in politics. She argues that the rhetoric surrounding triple oppression at the time of the article's publication focuses too hard on the "additive relation between these different dimensions of oppression," and not enough on their interdependent and intersecting facets. Black women workers' struggles are often disregarded as one identity gets the most political attention. Race is politically prioritized, so that gender is seen as less important within the patriarchy, among both women and men. Hassim argues that women's issues exist as political agendas only within broader ones, such as labor movements and resistance to racism. Discouraged by the unreliability created by feminism's bad reputation in South Africa, black women focus less on women's issues and more on anti-apartheid and labor issues, where they may receive more support.

Hassim goes on to explain that because of the intersections between capitalism and patriarchy, labor, as a gendered issue, creates a "double shift" that discourages women from participating politically, because they are too busy juggling their roles as "wage-earners and managers of families". As women are "isolat[ed]...in the household", they are robbed of the opportunity to develop "a common consciousness of oppression or exploitation." If they cannot gather, women cannot organize. Hassim argues that it is a combination of patriarchal values that empower men and employment obligations in domestic and other service-based jobs that limit women's ability to become active in campaigns that would benefit them only: women's rights campaigns.

=== Employment opportunities for Mexican-Americans ===
Denise Segura argues that the social inequality women of color face cannot be properly explained by an analysis any one of the facets that constitute triple oppression, because their subordination in social hierarchies is relative to men, white people, and higher-income strata. Chicana, or Mexican-American, women are subject to inequality in the home as well as in social contexts, such as the labor force. The relegation of women and minorities to traditionally low-paying jobs has made it so that Chicanas do not have many options for work outside of agriculture or domesticity, areas characterized by low wages and, therefore, low status. Discrimination based on race and gender and a reluctance to acculturate inhibit occupational mobility. Cultural cues and high fertility also encourage Mexican-American women to remain in the home and bear children instead of participating in the work force. The combination of race and gender bias and the inability to obtain white-collar jobs form the basis for the triple oppression felt by Mexican-American women. In turn, triple oppression limits Chicanas' employment opportunities to low wages, lower than her male (Chicano) and white (women) counterparts, and "secondary" jobs e.g. clerical and factory jobs, effectively solidifying their status at the bottom of the social hierarchy.

=== Asian-American activism ===
Adrienne Ann Winans and Judy Tzu-Chun Wu argue that "othered" groups, such as racial minorities, suffer from poor job prospects because of their "designat[ion] as outsiders." Groups marginalized by legal status and patriarchal values often find only low-paying work with little to no benefits or job security. Poor employment opportunities contribute to an intersectional subordination that includes legal status, gender, and race. Asian-American women's organizational efforts in the 1960s and 1970s to counter such phenomena proved to facilitate them. According to Winans and Wu, female activists recognized a bias within their own activism circles which "relied on female labor but privileged male leadership." Other manifestations of triple oppression in the Asian-American community are the exploitation of immigrant female workers, and gender roles that prescribe a duty to the "double shift." Within the double shift, women are expected to not only procreate but also rear the products of their unions and contribute to the work force at the same time, a feat not demanded of their male counterparts.

=== Queer communities ===
While the term triple oppression has typically been reserved to describe the plights of working women of color, the phenomenon of three intersecting social burdens has plagued gay men of color. Diaz et al.'s 1999 study, published in the American Journal of Public Health, found that the combined impact of homophobia, racism, and poverty cause adverse psychological effects in Latino men, including low self-esteem, depression, sleeping problems, anxiety, and social alienation. A factor that does not arise in typical analyses of triple oppression is HIV incidence, but this study concludes that HIV status as a source of social discrimination to the likes of race and class correlates with higher psychological symptoms. Gay men may benefit from male privilege, but in any case, they too can experience a measure of oppression in the form of systemic homophobia, with incidents of violence, belittlement, familial disapproval, job discrimination and police harassment.

=== Catalan countries ===
Catalan nationalist left-wing feminists have theorised a triple oppression characterisation of the status of working-class Catalan women. Their perspective points out to capitalism, Spanish nationalism and patriarchy as three interlocking domination systems.

=== See also ===
- Matrix of domination
- Oppression olympics
- Womanism
