= 2016 Democratic Party vice presidential candidate selection =

2016 Democratic vice presidential nomination
- July 22, 2016
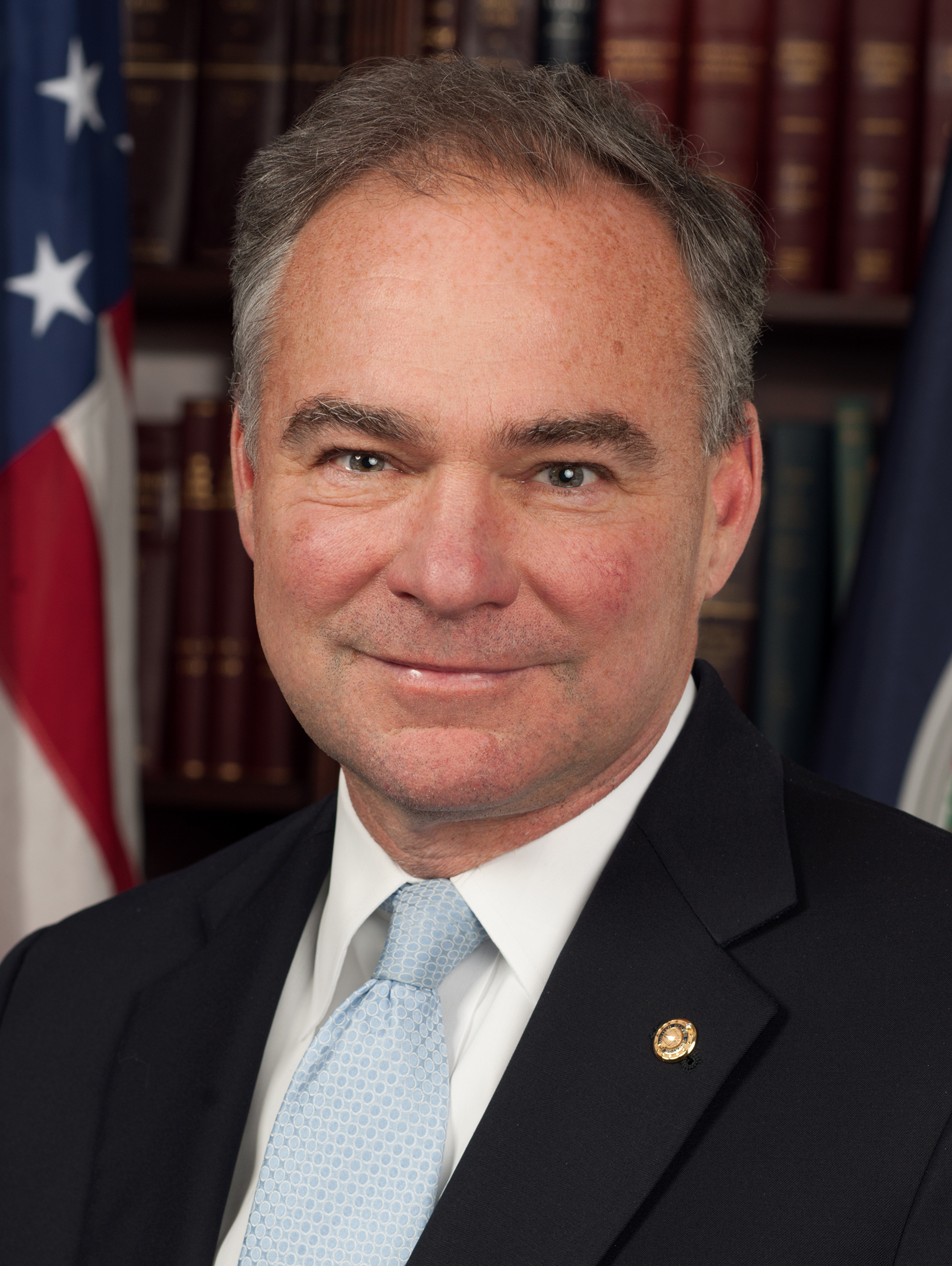
Nominee	Tim Kaine
Home state	Virginia
Previous Vice Presidential nominee
Joe Biden
Vice Presidential nominee
Tim Kaine

This article lists potential candidates for the Democratic nomination for vice president of the United States in the 2016 election. Former Secretary of State Hillary Clinton, the 2016 Democratic nominee for president of the United States, chose Senator Tim Kaine of Virginia as her running mate. The formal nomination took place at the 2016 Democratic National Convention. The Clinton–Kaine ticket ultimately lost to the Trump–Pence ticket in the general election, and Kaine returned to the Senate following the campaign.

== Selection process ==
By April 2016, Clinton had begun discussions with advisers and allies regarding her potential running mate, though Bernie Sanders continued to challenge her in the Democratic primaries. According to campaign sources, Clinton did not have a particular running mate in mind, and did not feel pressured to pick a running mate designed specifically to appeal to Sanders supporters. Clinton's low public approval ratings led many of her allies to recommend that she choose a running mate with the potential to inspire voters, but Clinton's campaign expressed confidence that her ratings would improve once the Republicans had selected a candidate. There was relatively little public discussion about Sanders's running mate selection process. As the 2016 Republican National Convention took place roughly one week before the July 25–28 Democratic National Convention, the Democratic presidential nominee was set to choose her running mate after the Republicans nominated their ticket of Donald Trump and Mike Pence. Clinton's running mate selection process was led by campaign chairman John Podesta and Cheryl Mills, while the vetting process was led by attorney James Hamilton. In discussing her potential vice presidential choice, Clinton stated that the most important attribute she was looking for was the ability and experience to immediately step into the role of president. In contrast to previous Democratic presidential nominees, Clinton allowed for a relatively open selection process, holding rallies with many potential running mates and placing little emphasis on keeping her short list confidential.

== Announcement ==
On July 22, Clinton announced via Twitter that she had chosen Tim Kaine as her running mate. After the selection, Amy Chozick of The New York Times described Kaine as a "battleground state politician with working-class roots and a fluency in Spanish." Like his Republican counterpart, Mike Pence, Kaine had experience both as a governor and a member of Congress.

If the Clinton-Kaine ticket had won election, Kaine would have resigned from the Senate, with Democratic Governor Terry McAuliffe appointing Kaine's replacement prior to a 2017 special election. According to journalist Glenn Thrush, Kaine had been Clinton's preferred choice since at least February 2016.

== Reported shortlist ==
The Wall Street Journal reported on June 16, 2016, that Clinton's shortlist included the following nine individuals.

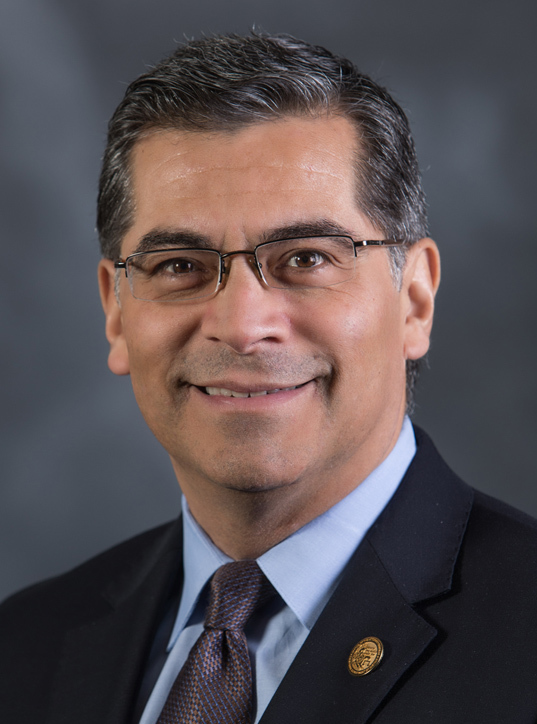
Representative
Xavier Becerra
from California

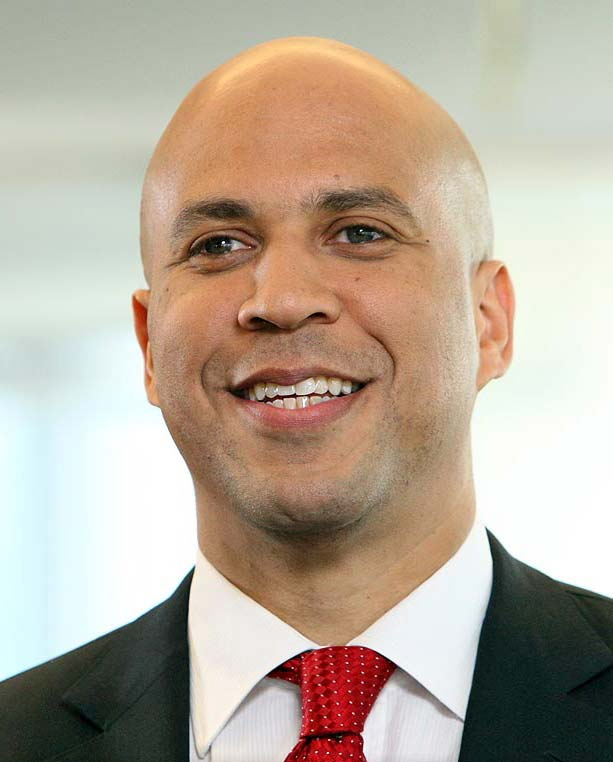
Senator
Cory Booker
from New Jersey

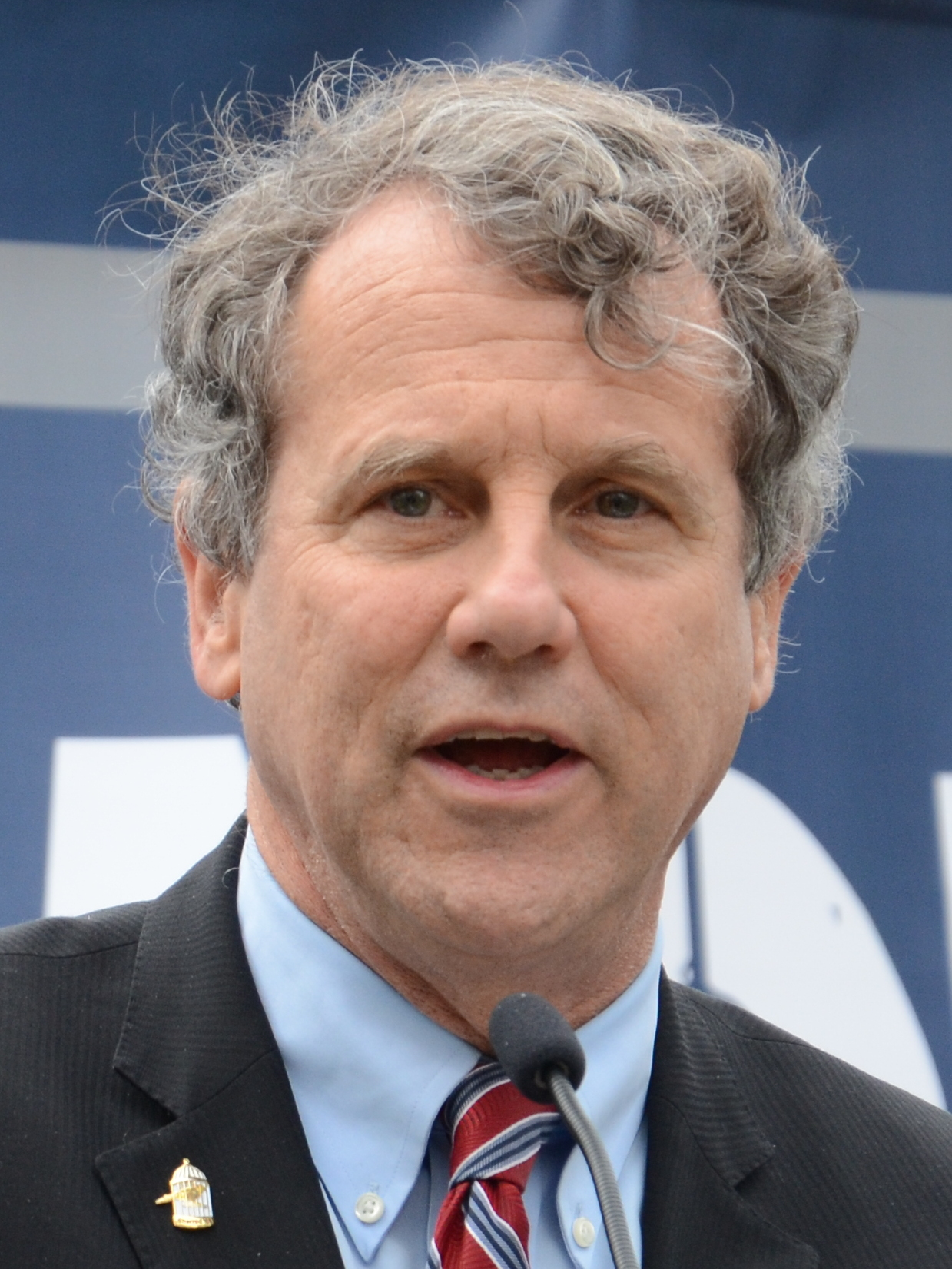
Senator
Sherrod Brown
from Ohio

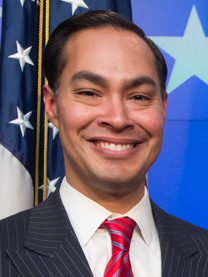
Secretary of Housing and Urban Development
Julián Castro
from Texas

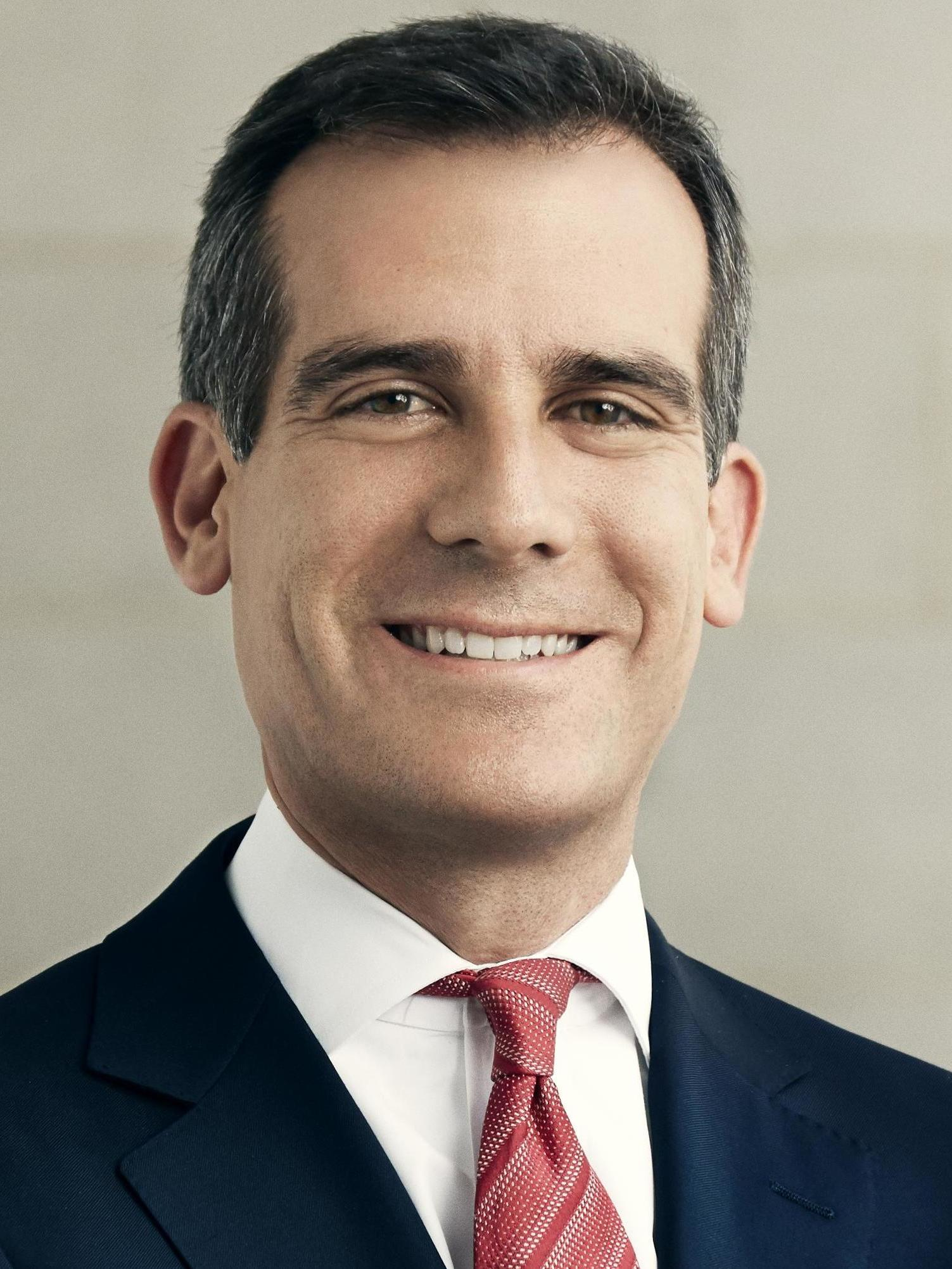
Mayor of Los Angeles
Eric Garcetti
from California

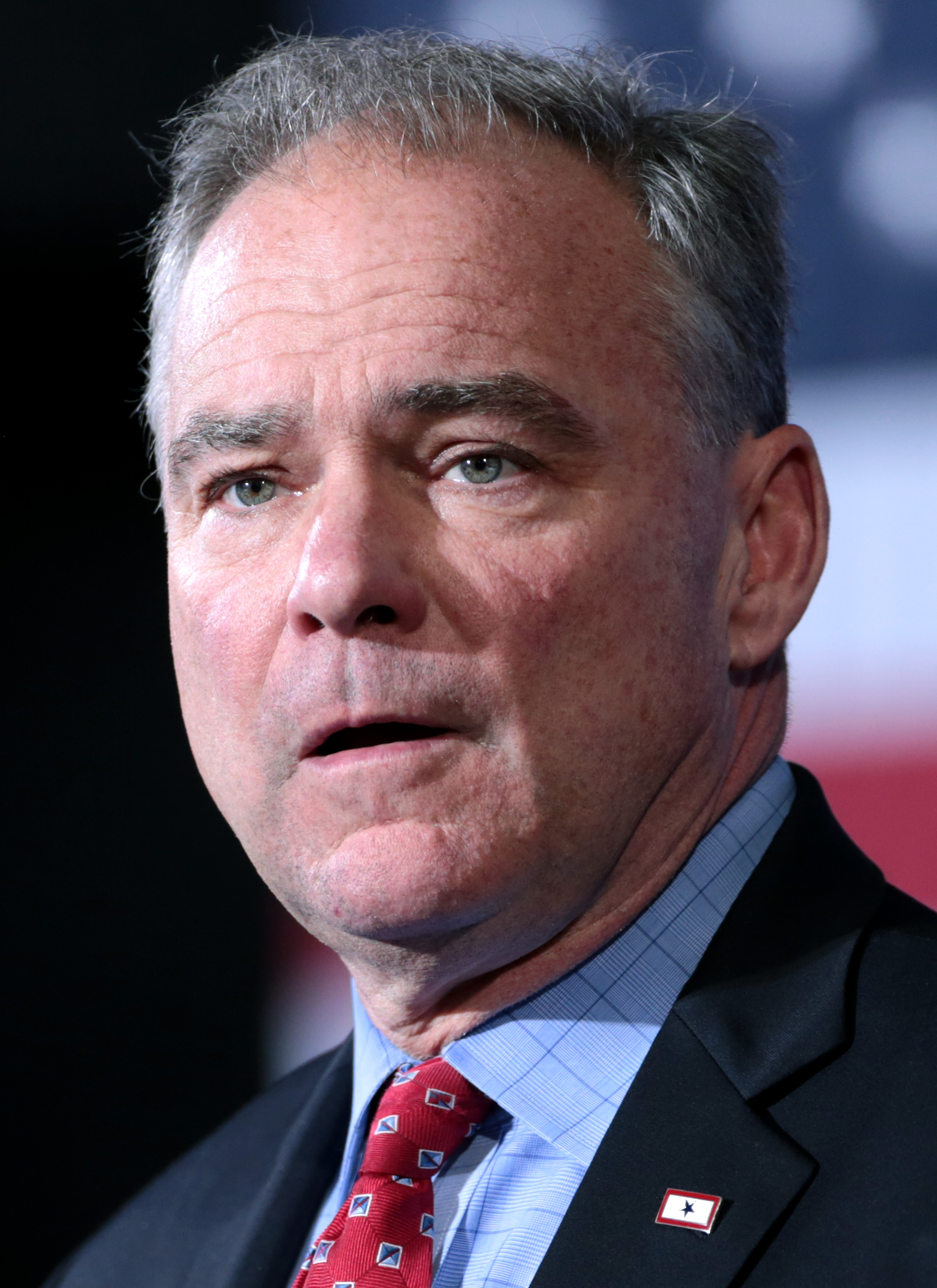
Senator and former Governor
Tim Kaine
of Virginia

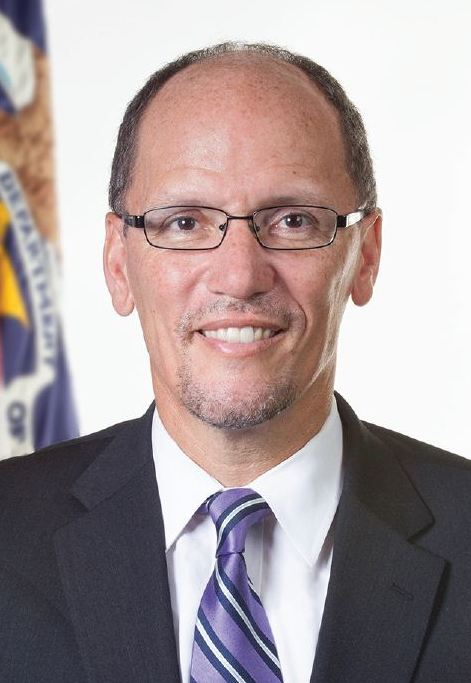
Secretary of Labor
Tom Perez
from Maryland

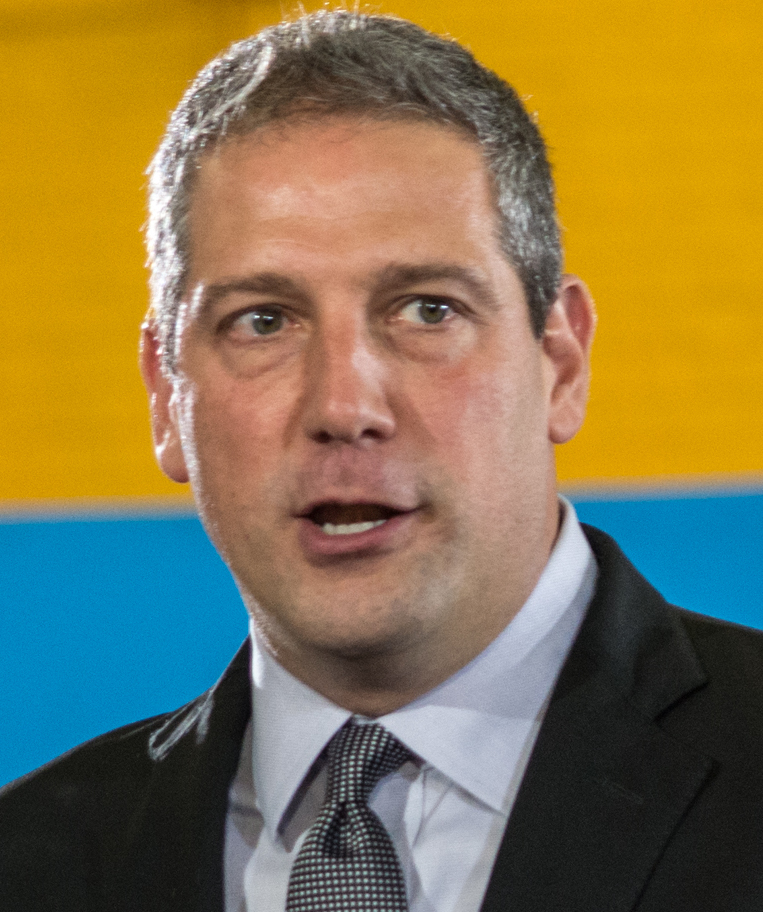
Representative
Tim Ryan
from Ohio

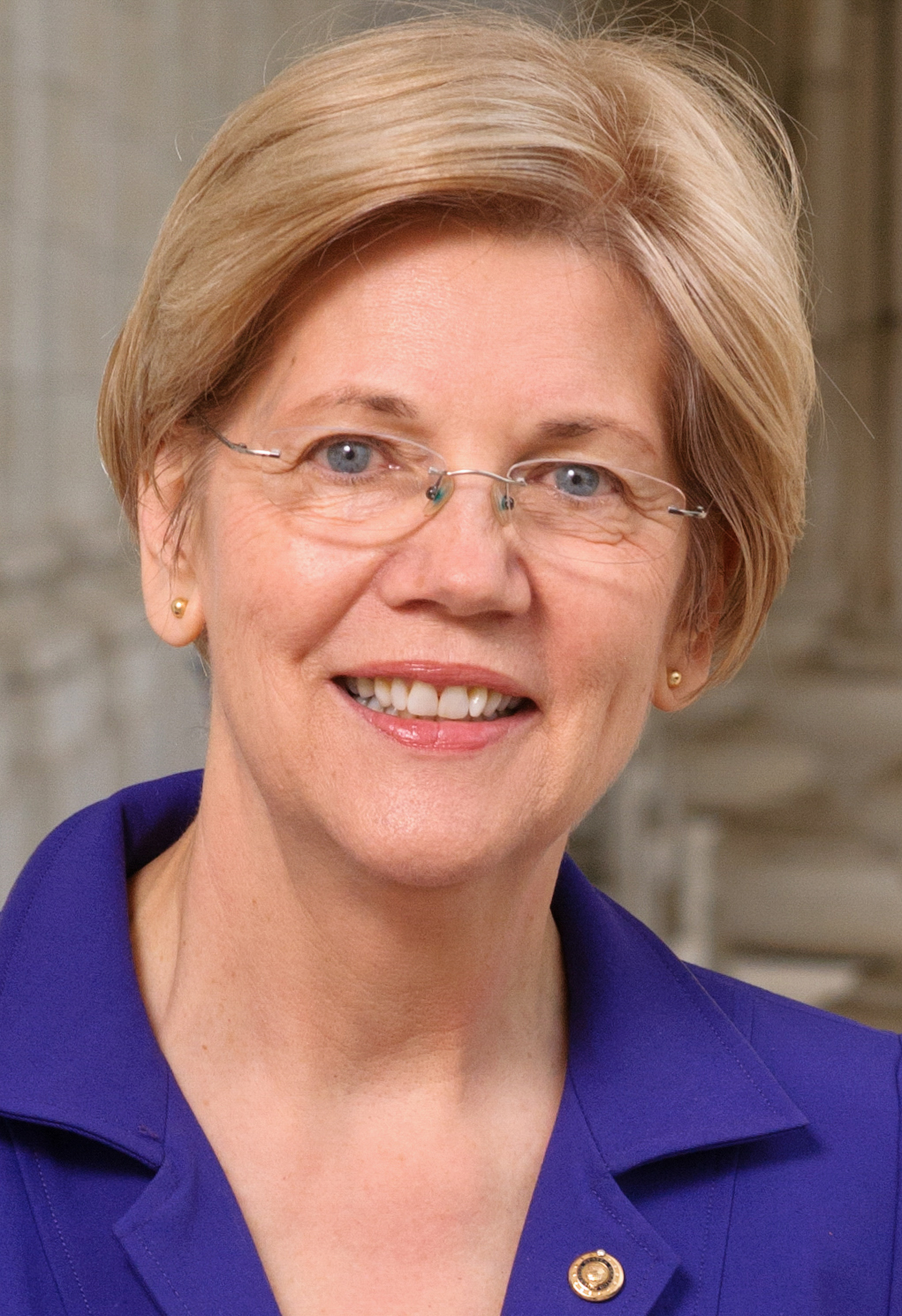
Senator
Elizabeth Warren
from Massachusetts

According to a CNN report published on June 21, 2016, Clinton had narrowed down her list to no more than five contenders, including Kaine, Warren, and Castro. However, a separate report in The Washington Post released that same day stated that, while Clinton had begun vetting Kaine, Warren, and Castro, more than a dozen people remained on her list of possible running mates. On July 7, 2016, CNN reported that Clinton had narrowed down her shortlist to five people: Brown, Kaine, Perez, Warren, and Secretary of Agriculture Tom Vilsack. On July 12, 2016, The New York Times confirmed that the Clinton campaign was vetting former NATO Supreme Allied Commander Europe, Retired Admiral James G. Stavridis. Clinton also met with Colorado Governor John Hickenlooper in mid-July, fueling speculation that he might be chosen as the vice presidential nominee. After Republican presidential nominee Donald Trump named Mike Pence as his running mate on July 15, Kaine and Vilsack emerged as the top two contenders, although other individuals such as Perez remained in contention.

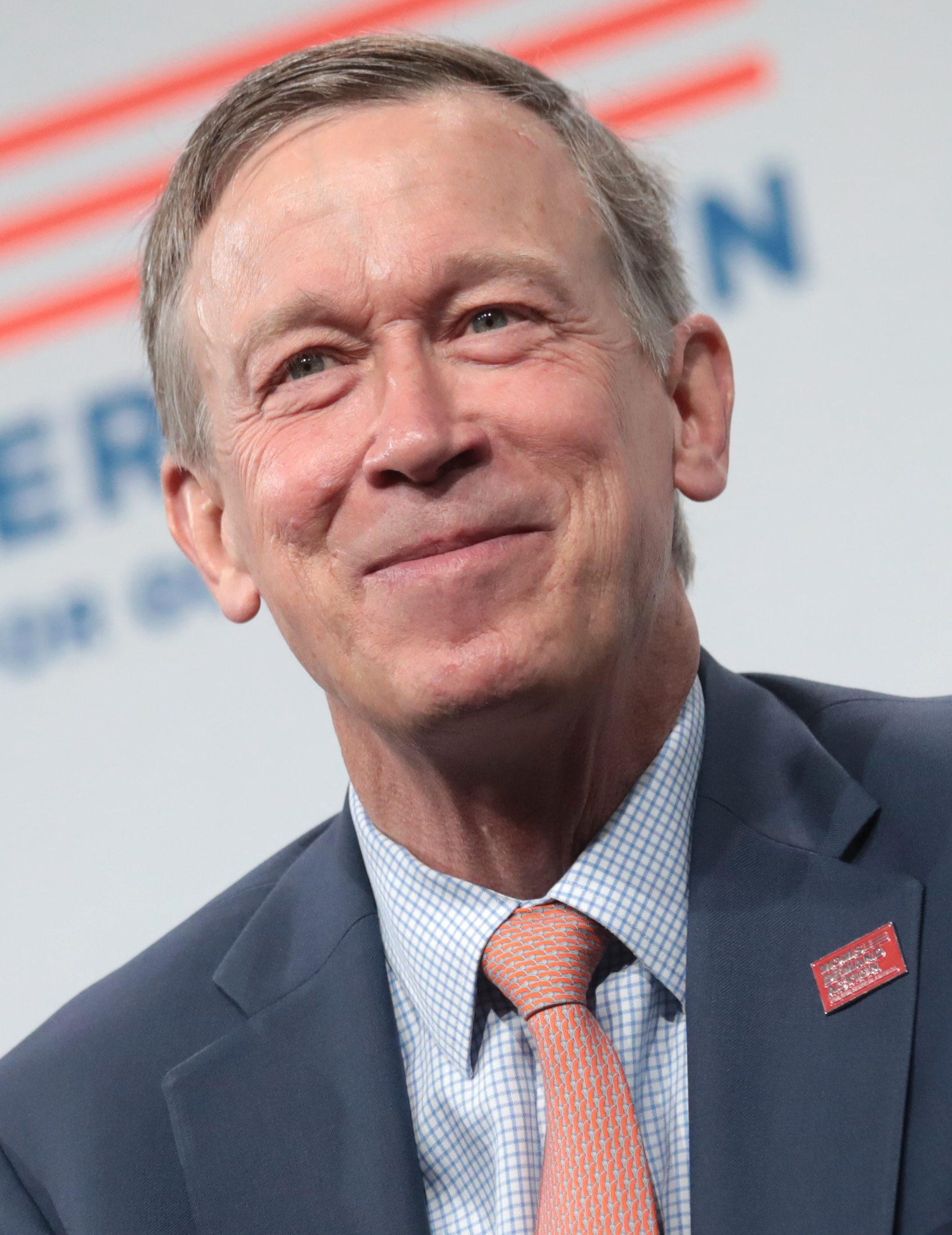
Governor
John Hickenlooper
of Colorado

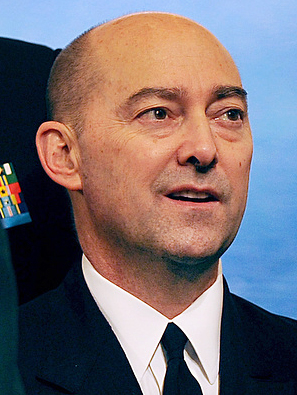
Retired Admiral and former NATO commander
James Stavridis
from Florida

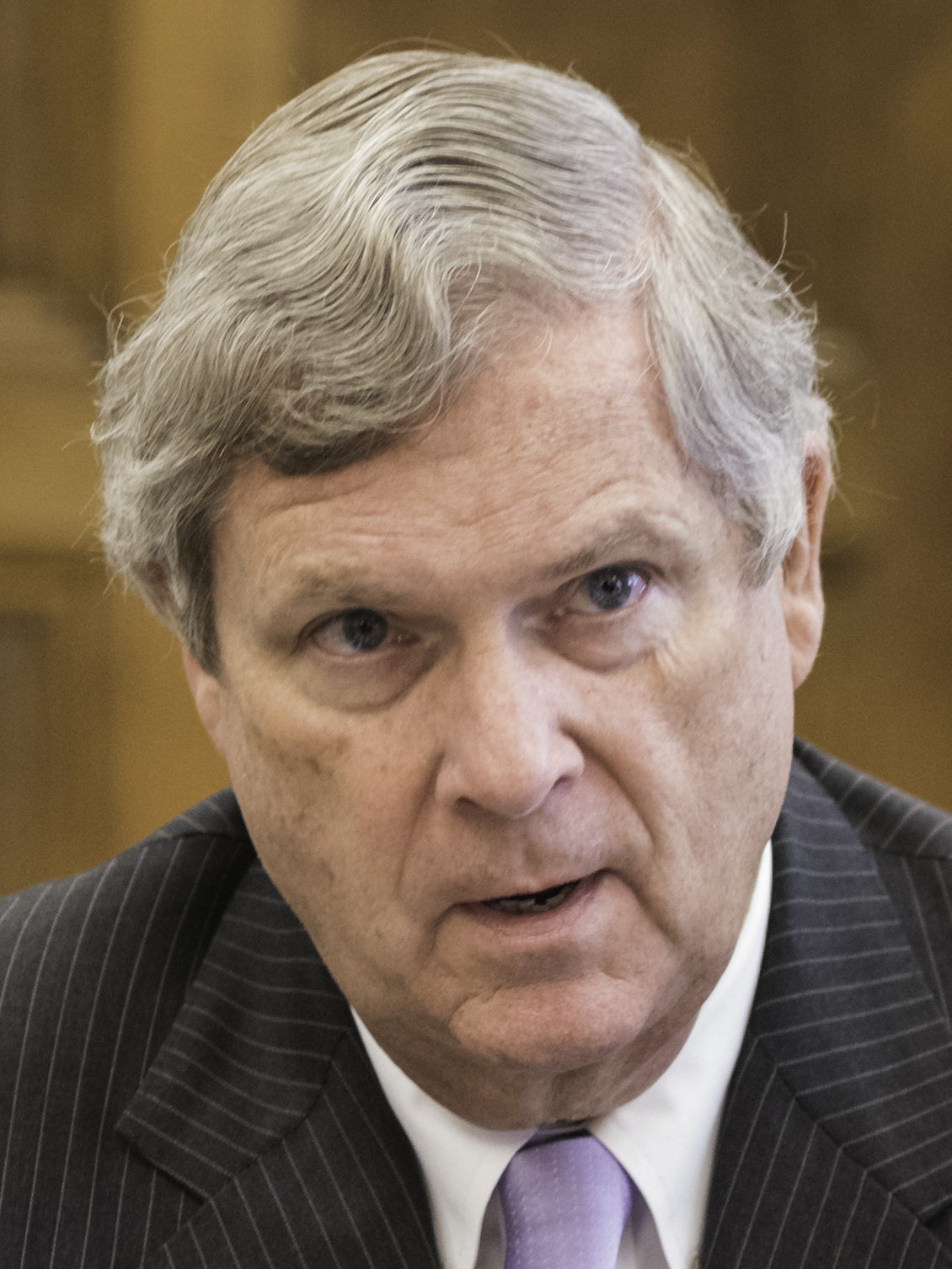
Secretary of Agriculture
Tom Vilsack
from Iowa

== WikiLeaks list ==
On October 18, 2016 WikiLeaks released more hacked emails from Clinton Campaign Chair John Podesta. One of these emails Podesta sent Clinton was a "first cut of people to consider for VP" in March 2016. He wrote that this list had been generated with other top aides. Podesta organized the list of 39 contenders into what he called "food groups" apparently based around identities — Latinos, women, African-Americans, military brass, and business leaders.

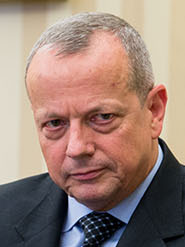
Retired U.S. Marine Corps General
John Allen

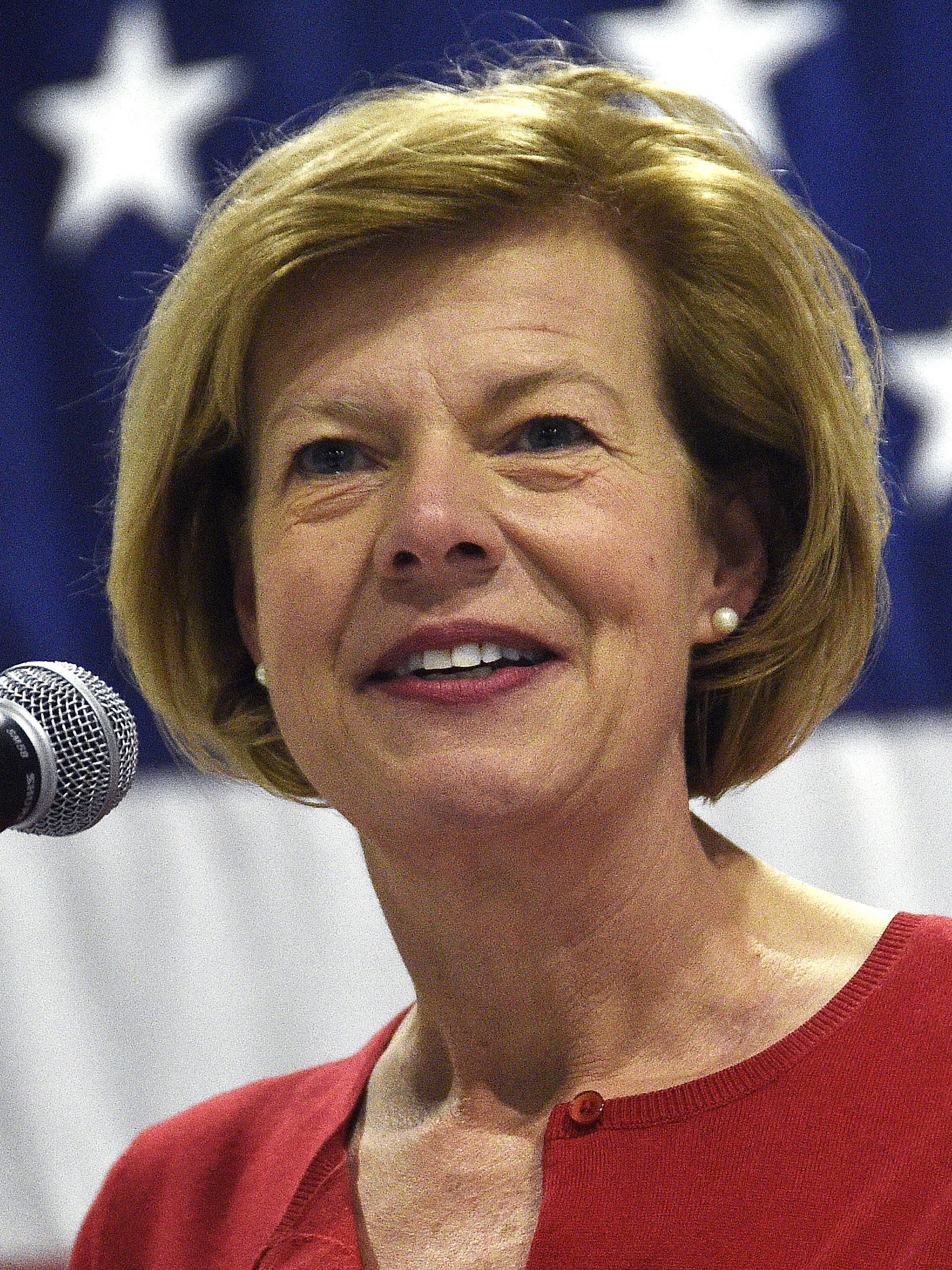
Senator
Tammy Baldwin
from Wisconsin

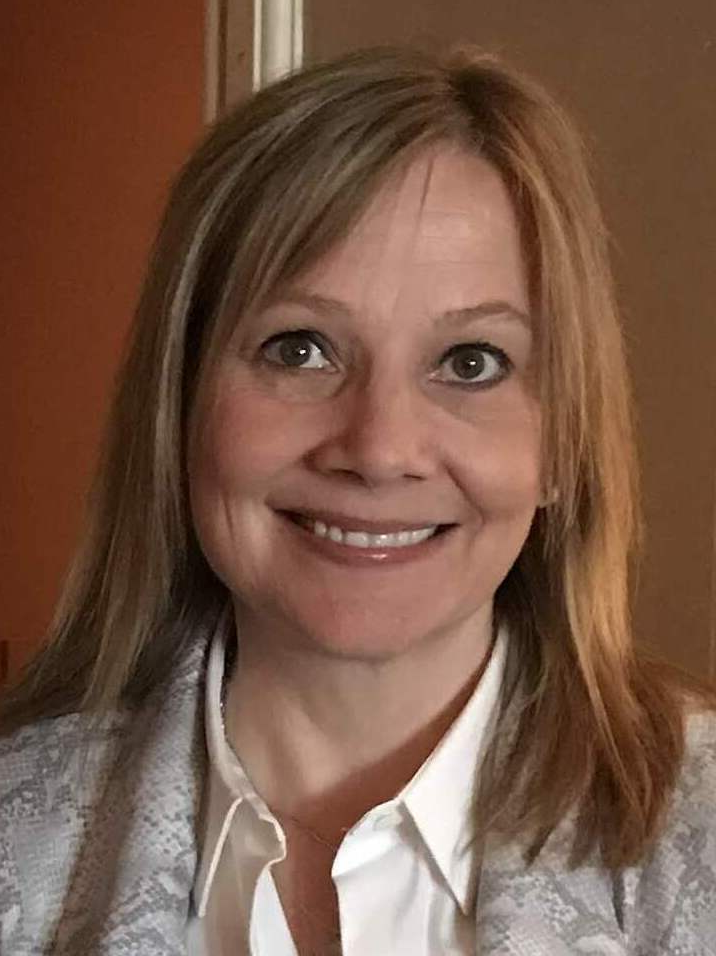
General Motors CEO
Mary Barra
from Michigan

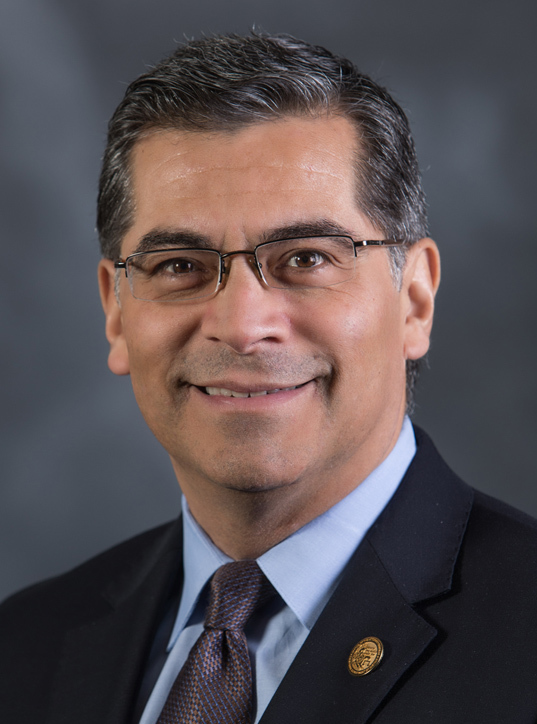
Representative
Xavier Becerra
from California

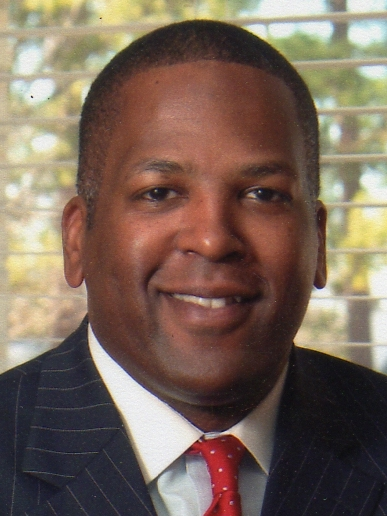
Mayor of Columbia
Stephen Benjamin
from South Carolina

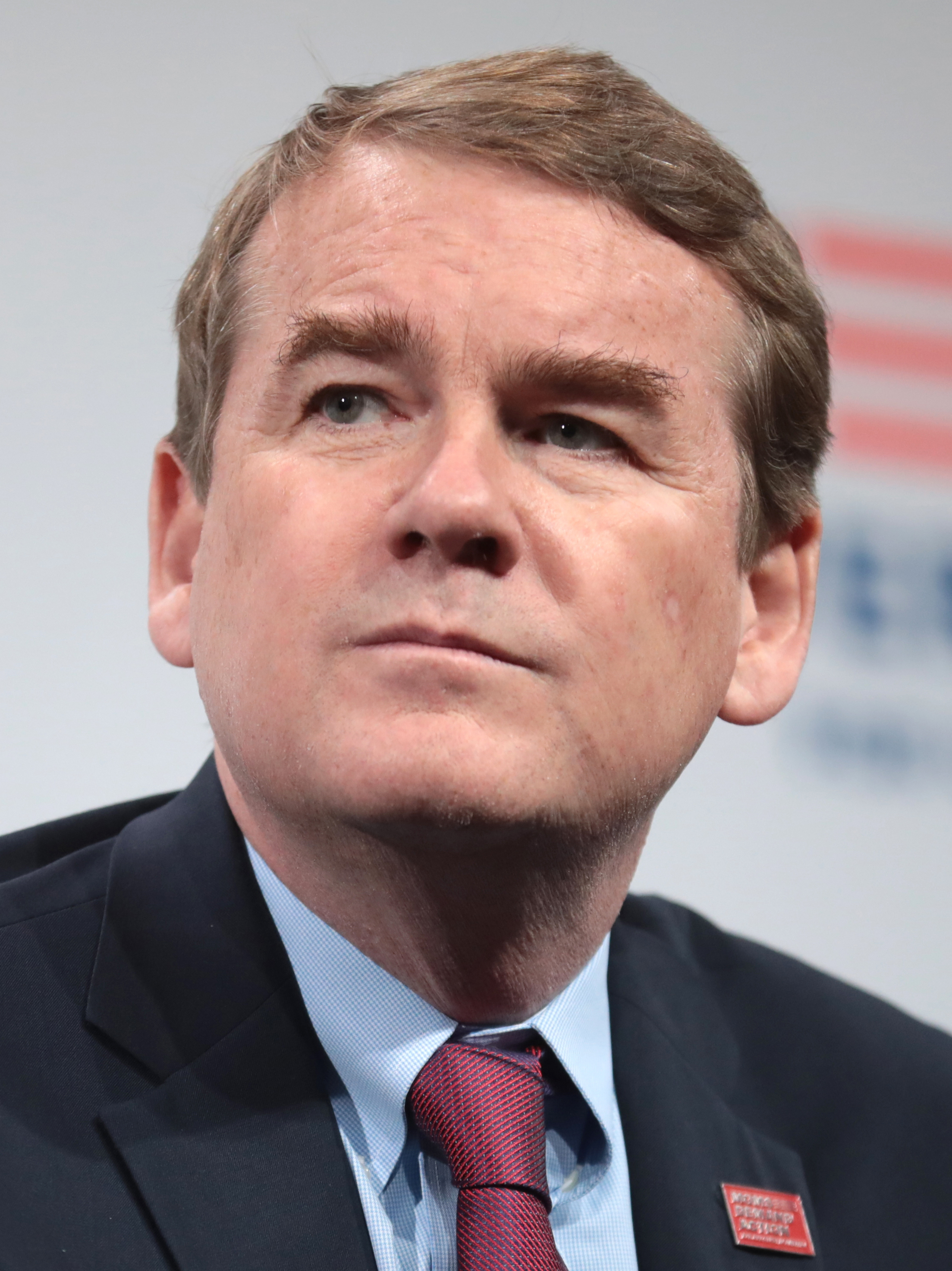
Senator
Michael Bennet
from Colorado

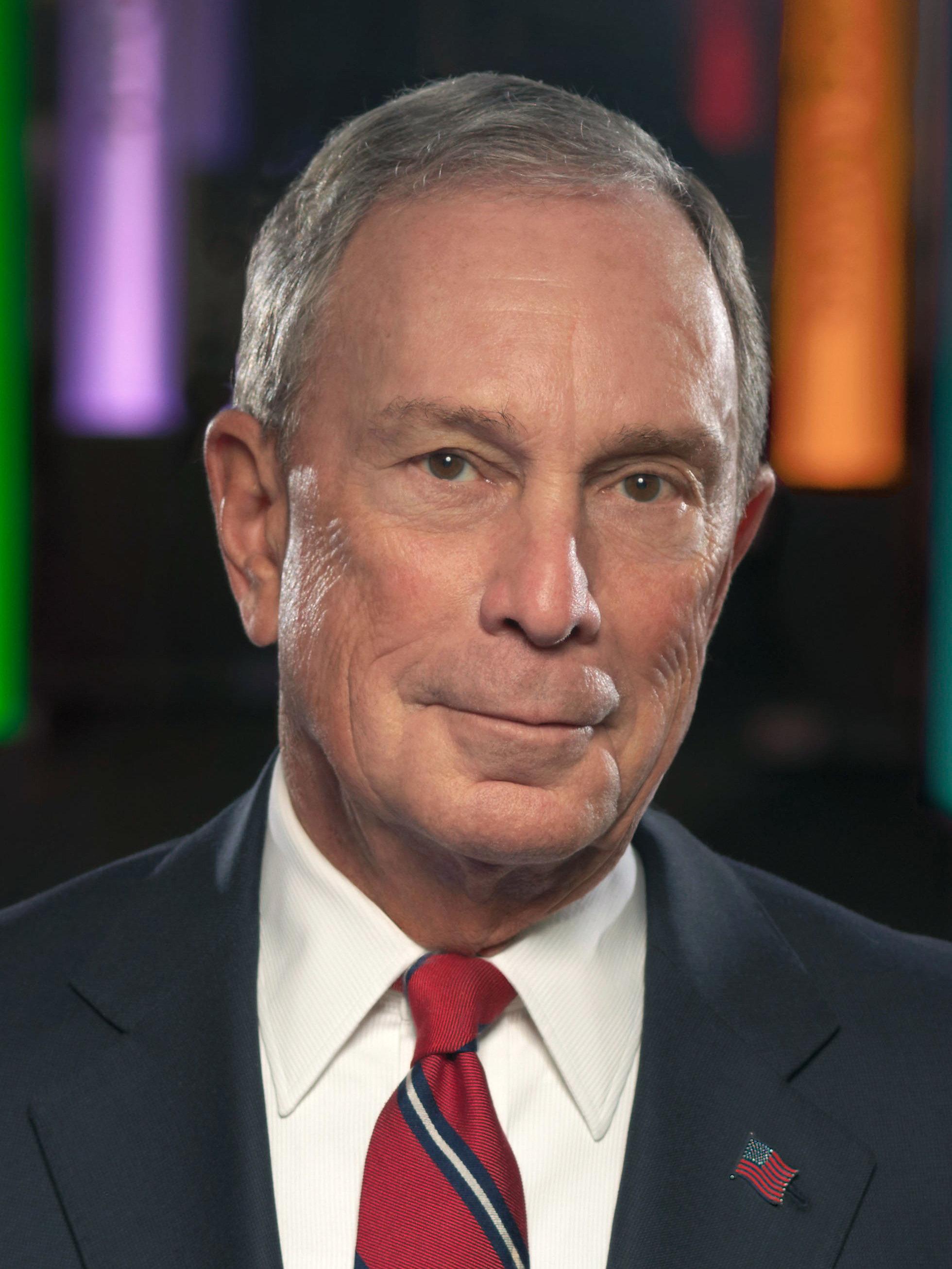
Former Mayor of New York City
Michael Bloomberg
from New York

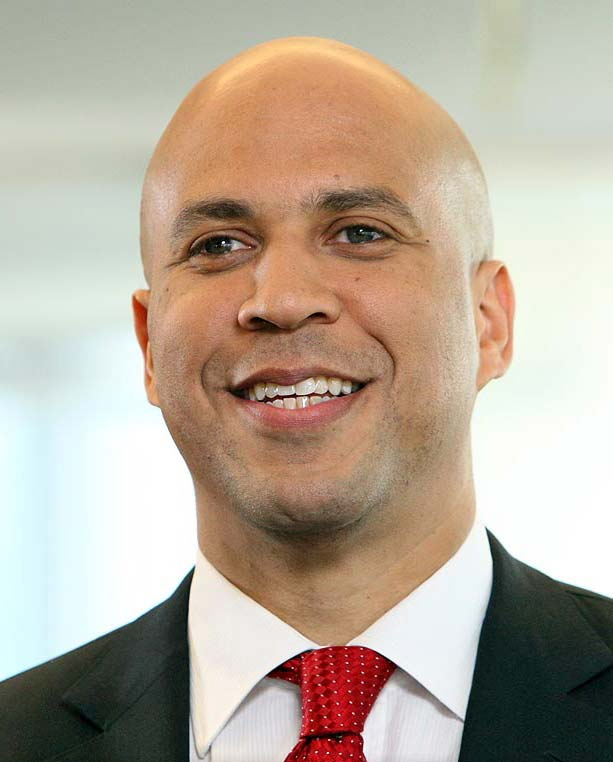
Senator
Cory Booker
from New Jersey

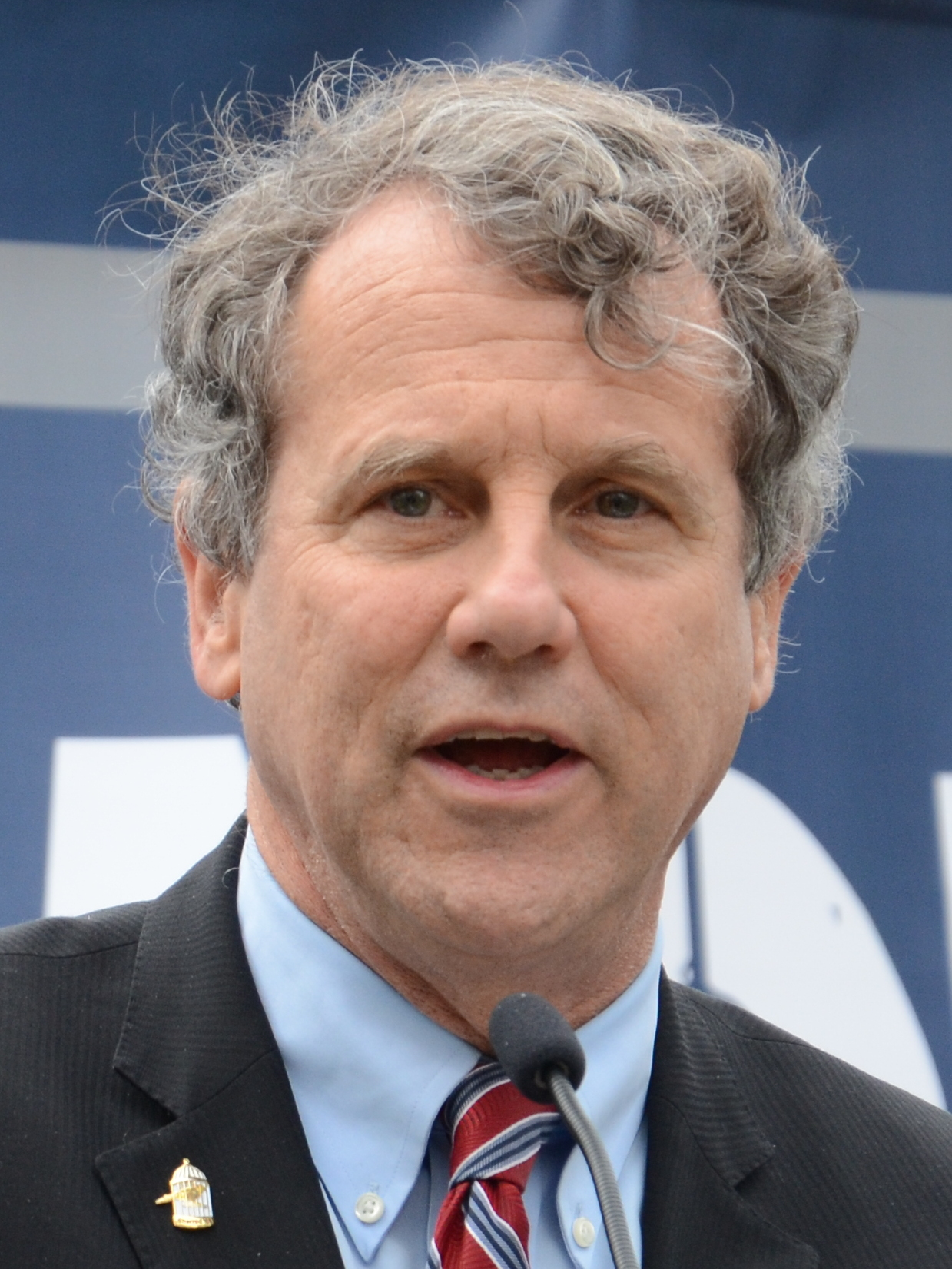
Senator
Sherrod Brown
from Ohio

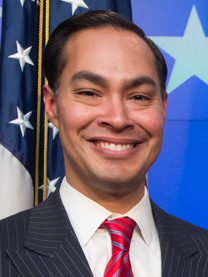
Secretary of Housing and Urban Development
Julián Castro
from Texas

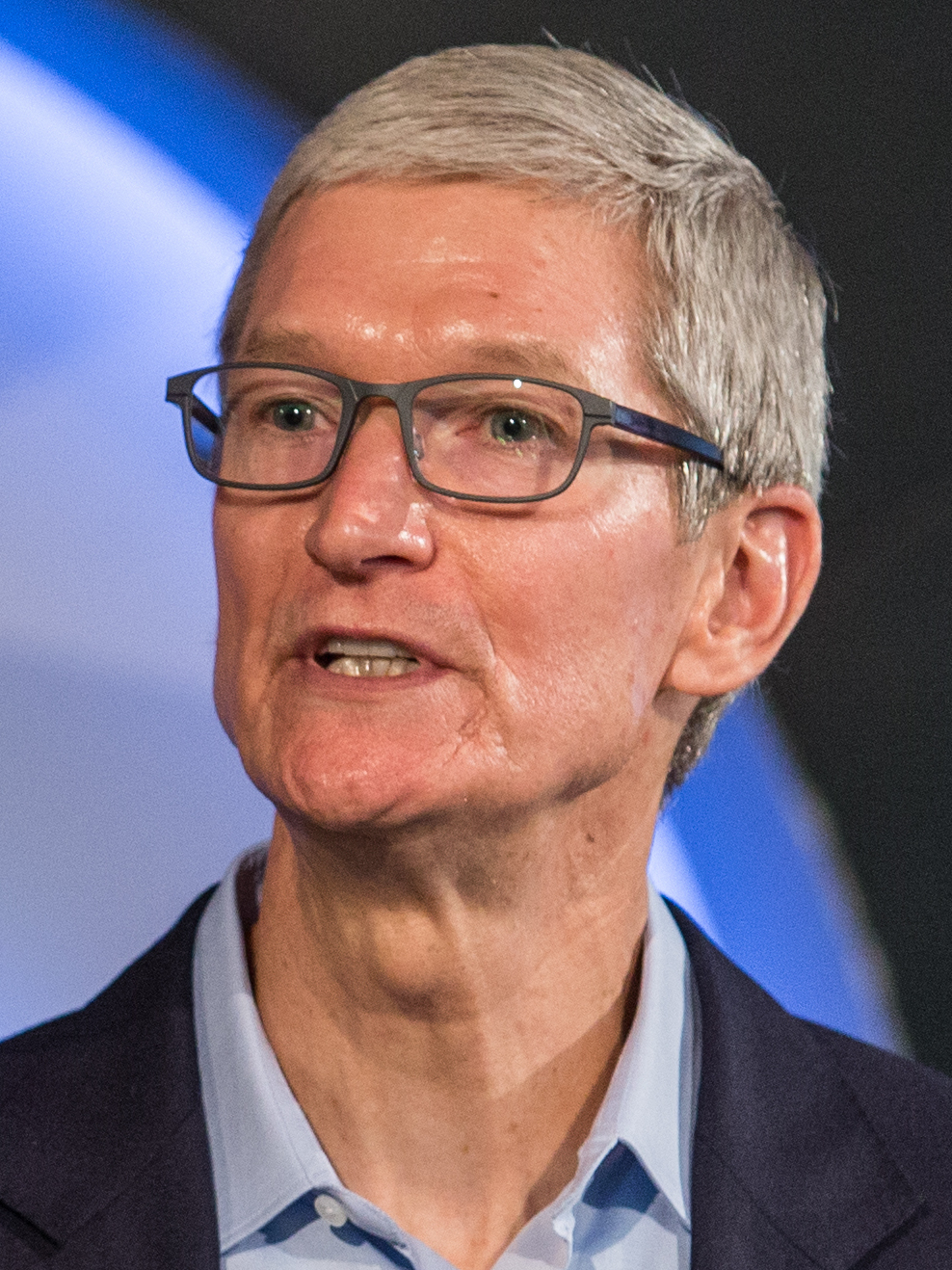
Apple CEO
Tim Cook
of California

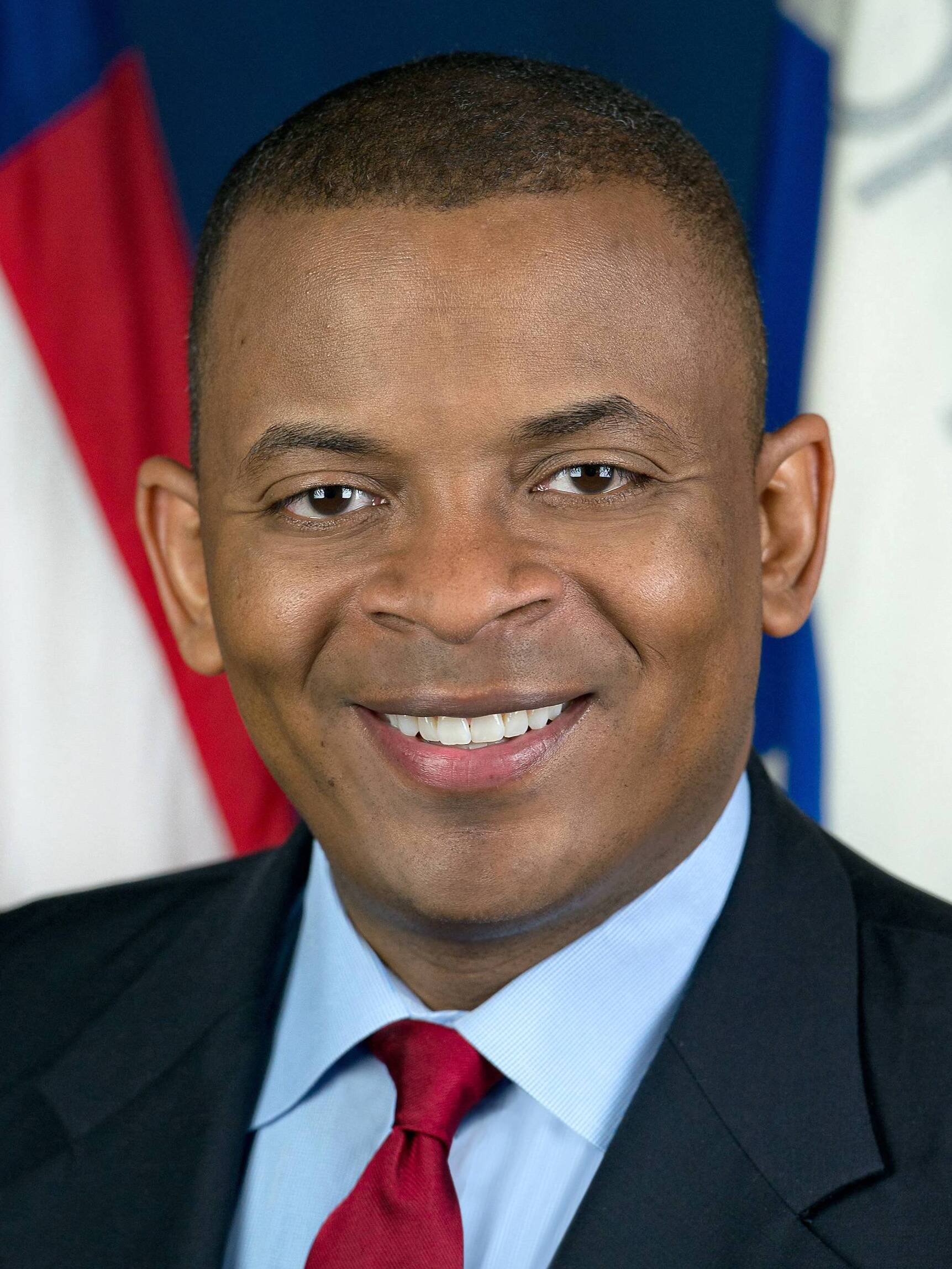
Secretary of Transportation
Anthony Foxx
from North Carolina

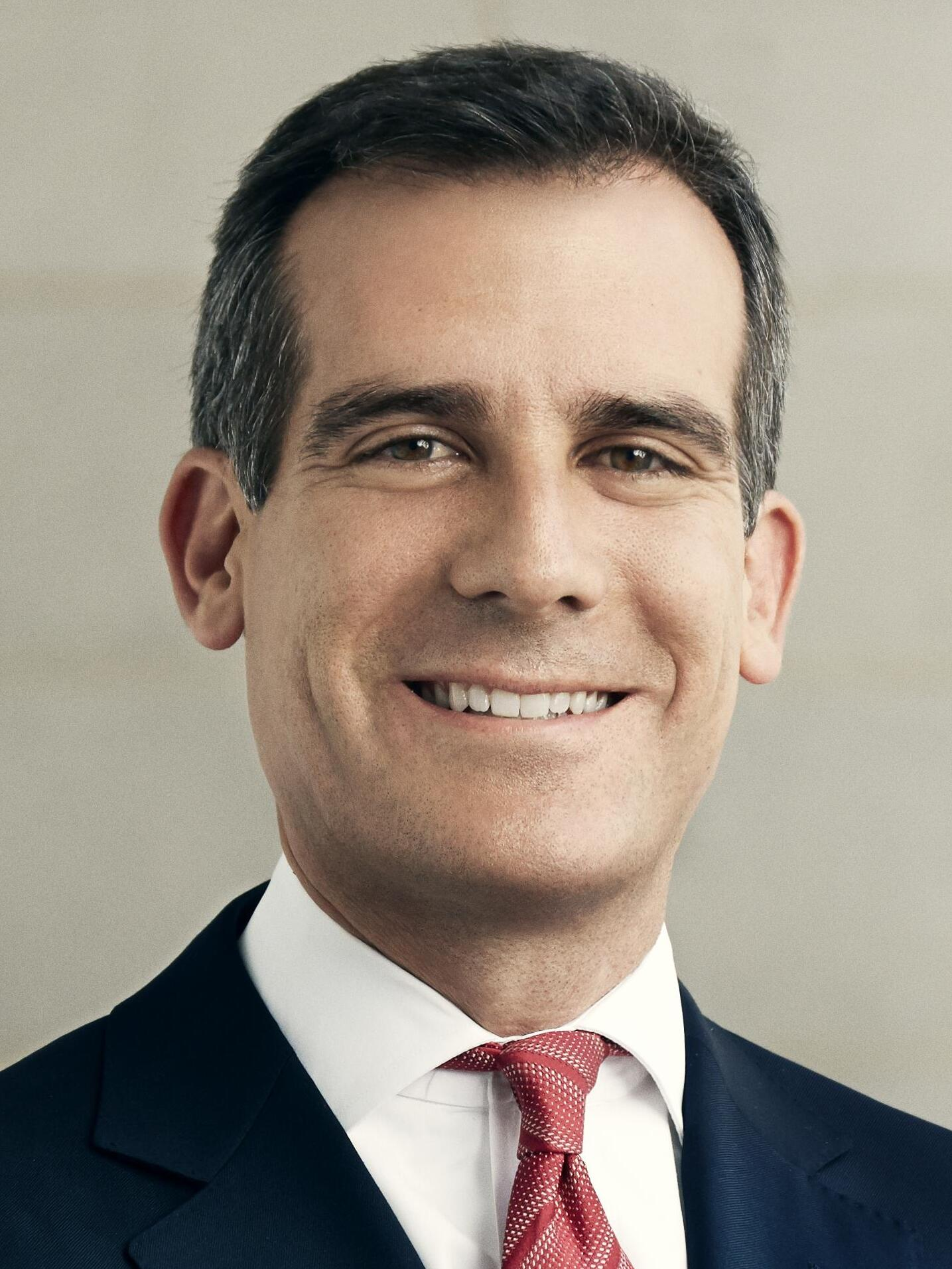
Mayor of Los Angeles
Eric Garcetti
from California

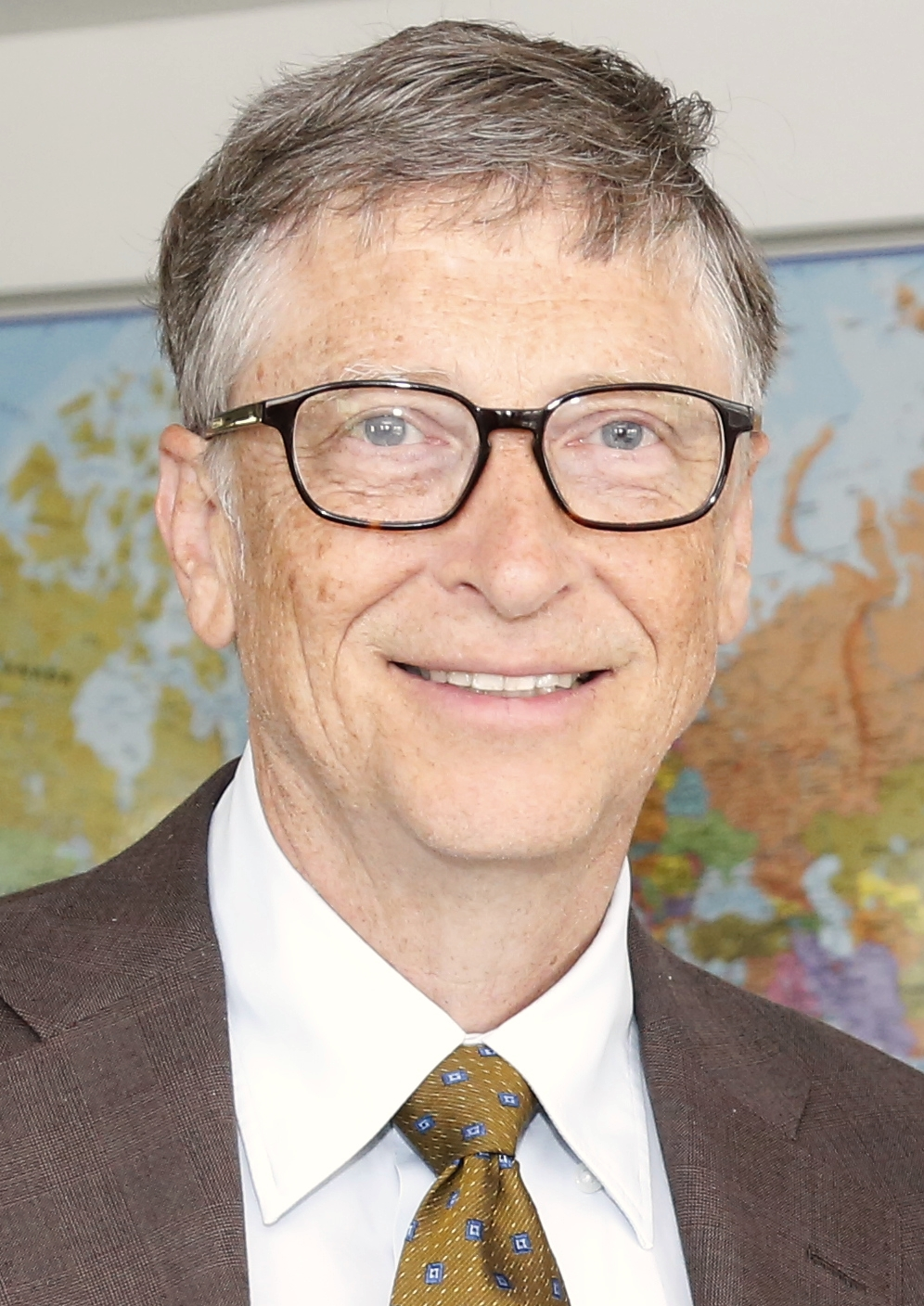
Former CEO and founder of Microsoft
Bill Gates
from Washington

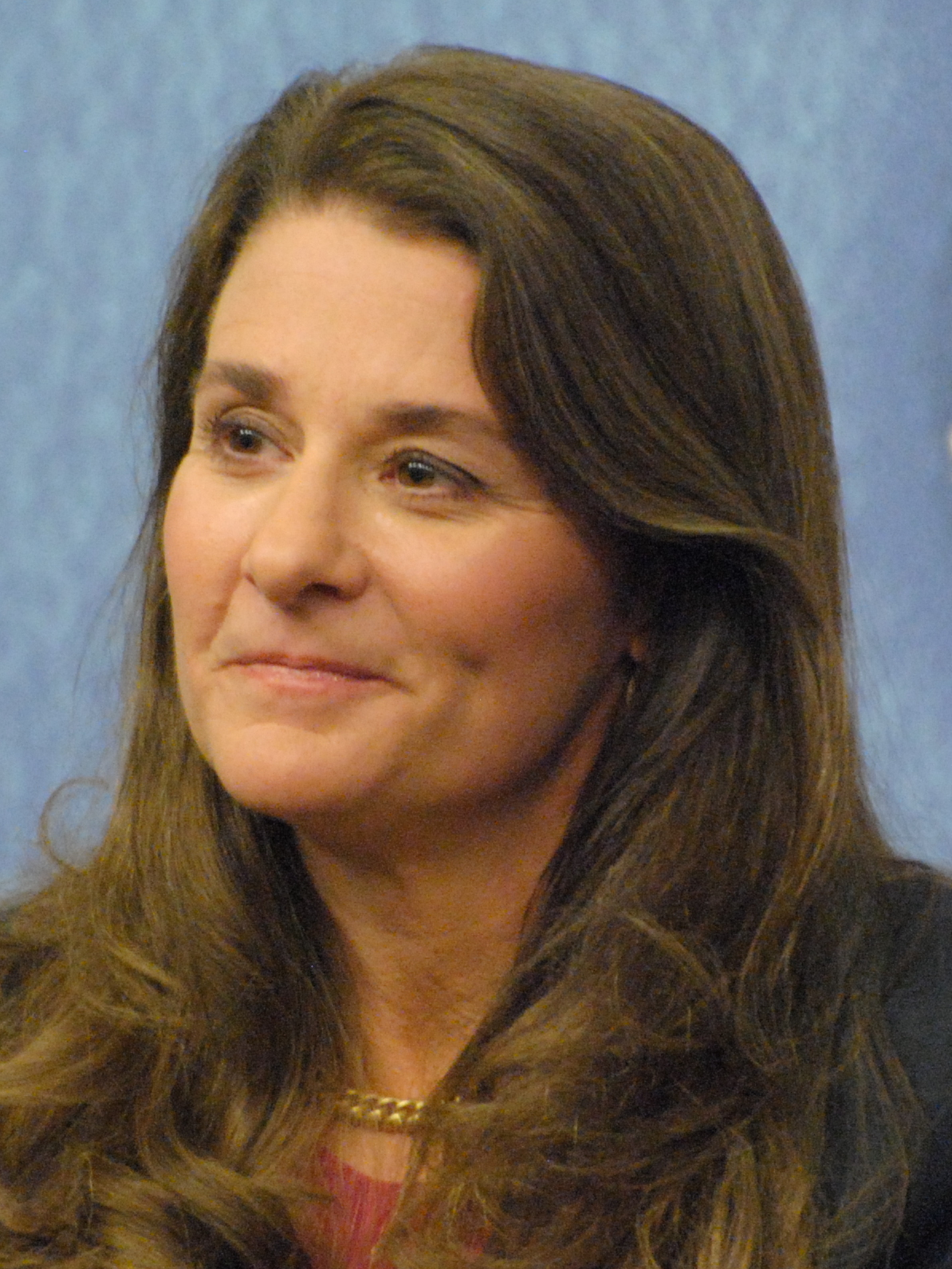
Co-founder of the Bill & Melinda Gates Foundation
Melinda Gates
from Washington

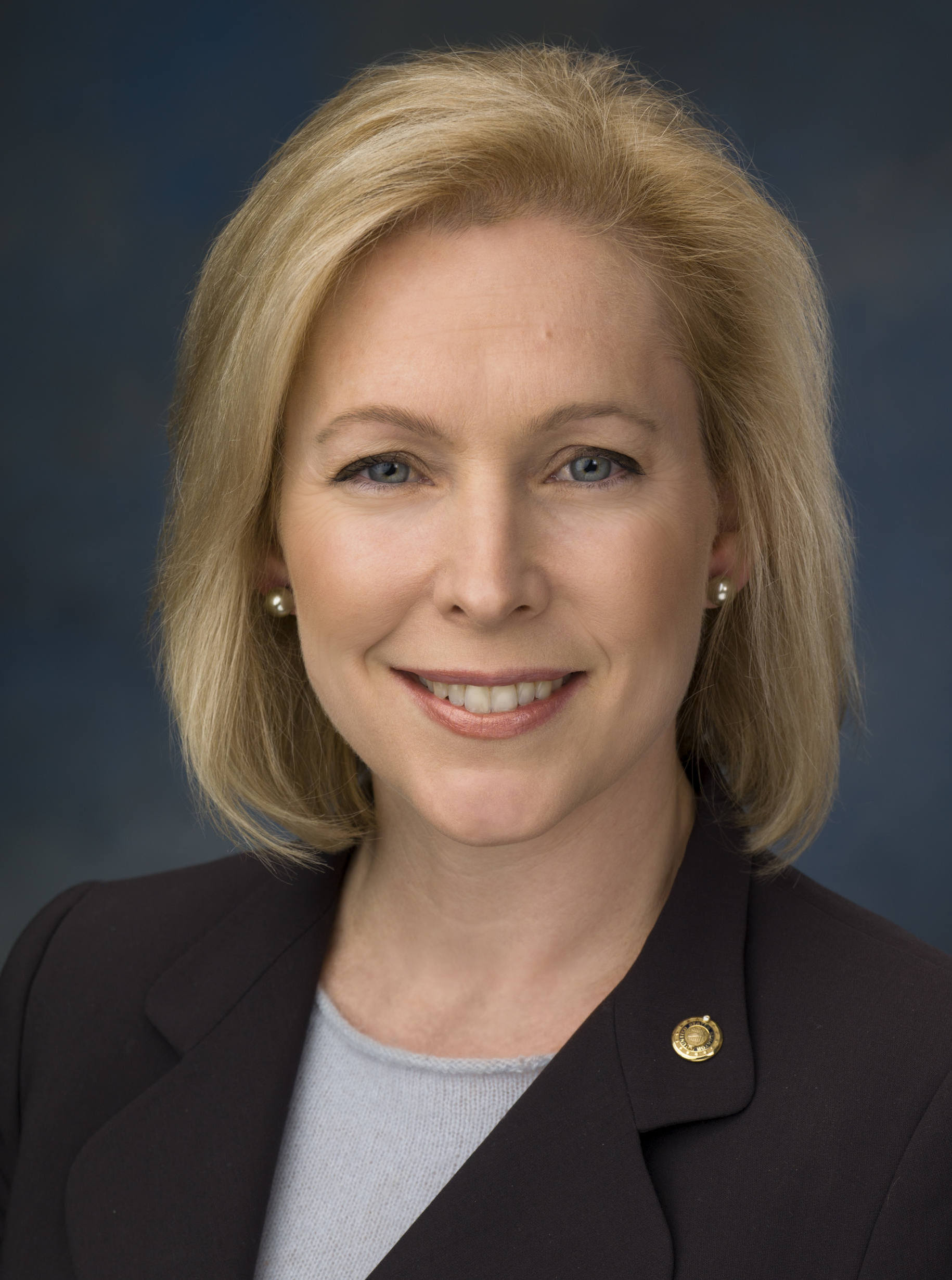
Senator
Kirsten Gillibrand
from New York

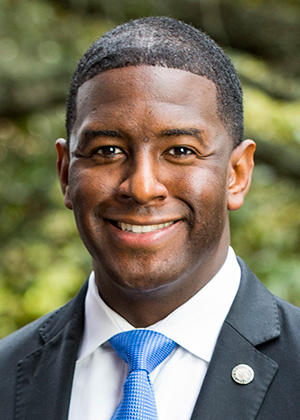
Mayor of Tallahassee
Andrew Gillum
from Florida

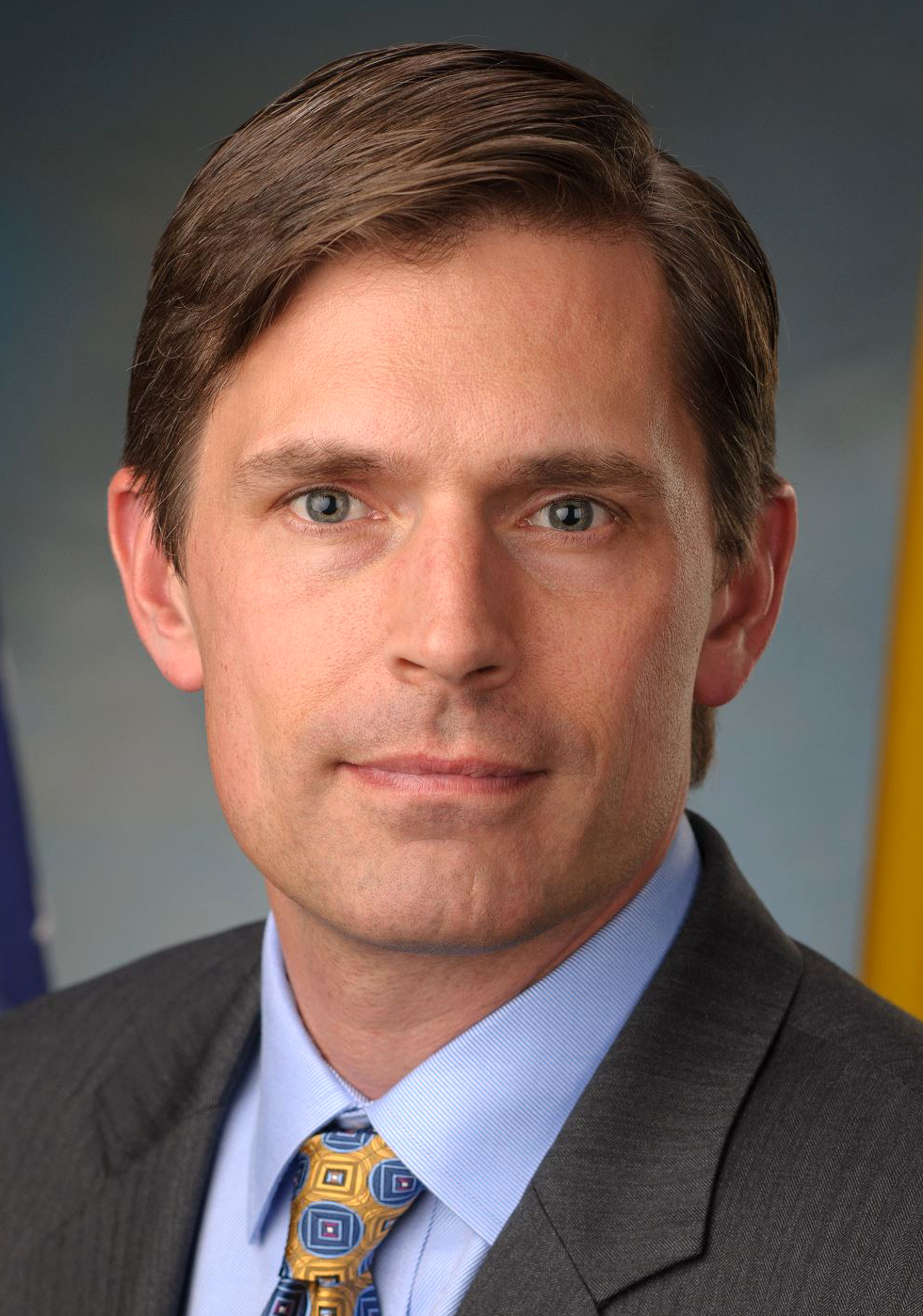
Senator
Martin Heinrich
from New Mexico

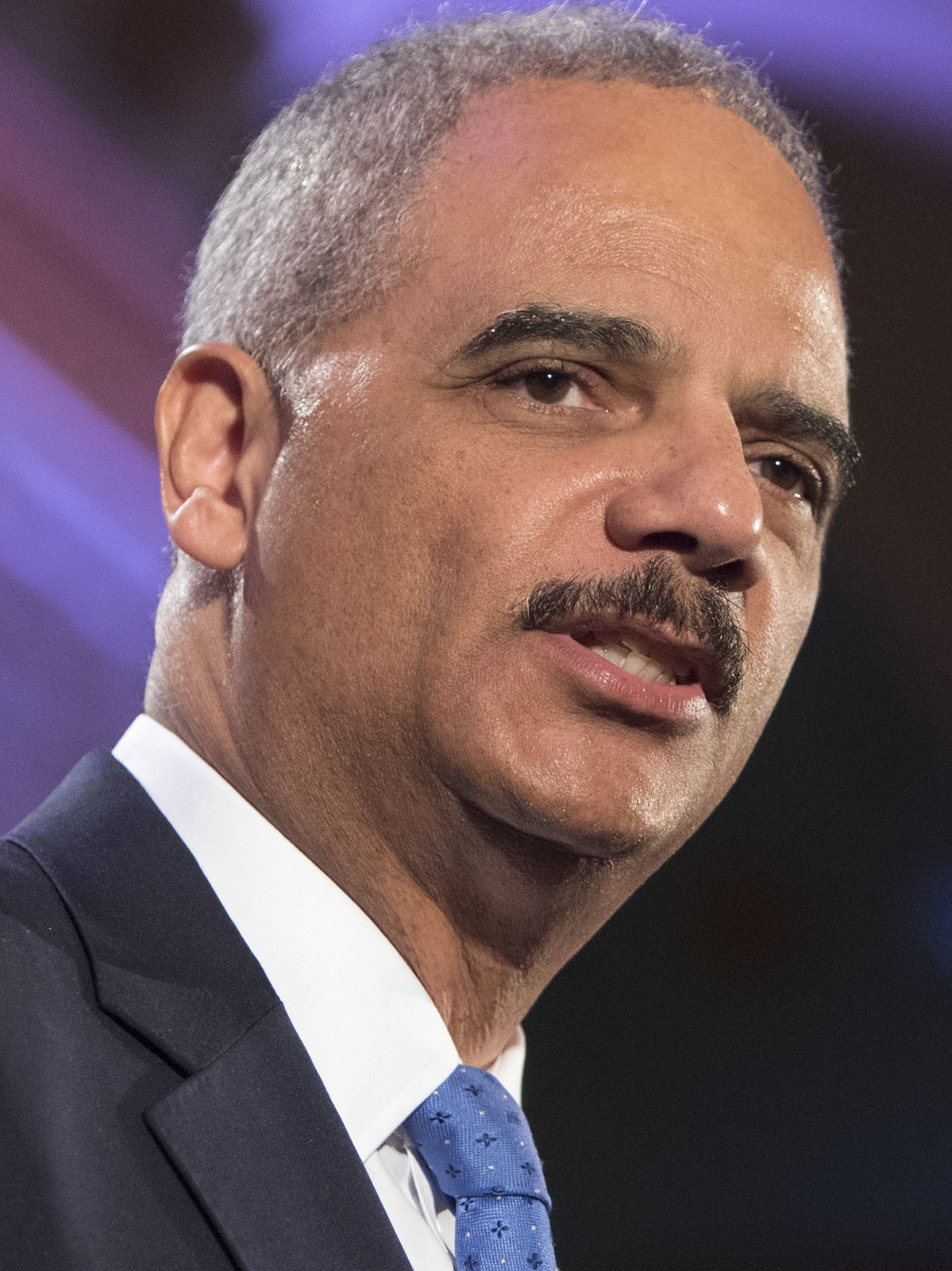
Former Attorney General
Eric Holder
from New York

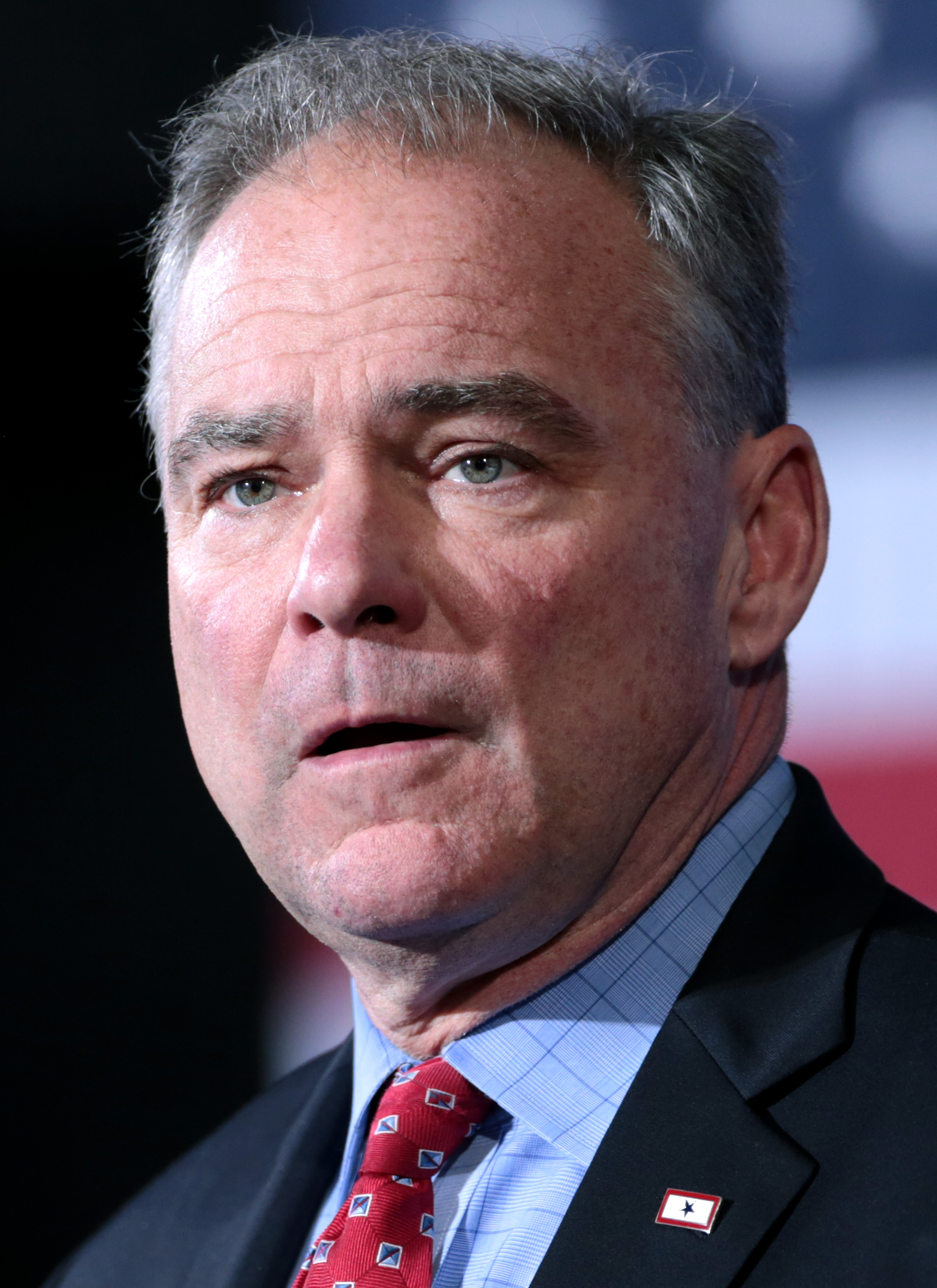
Senator and former Governor
Tim Kaine
from Virginia

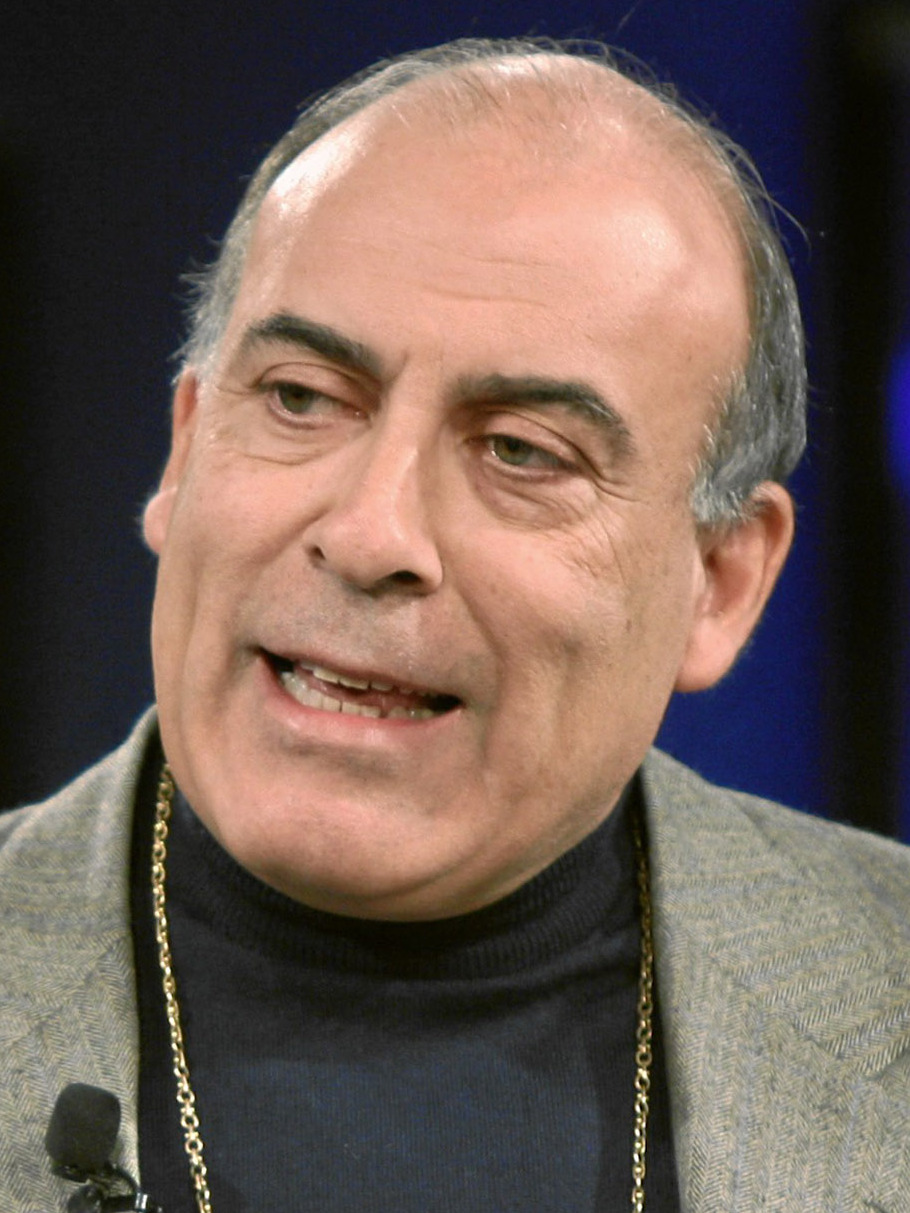
CEO of The Coca-Cola Company
Muhtar Kent
from Georgia

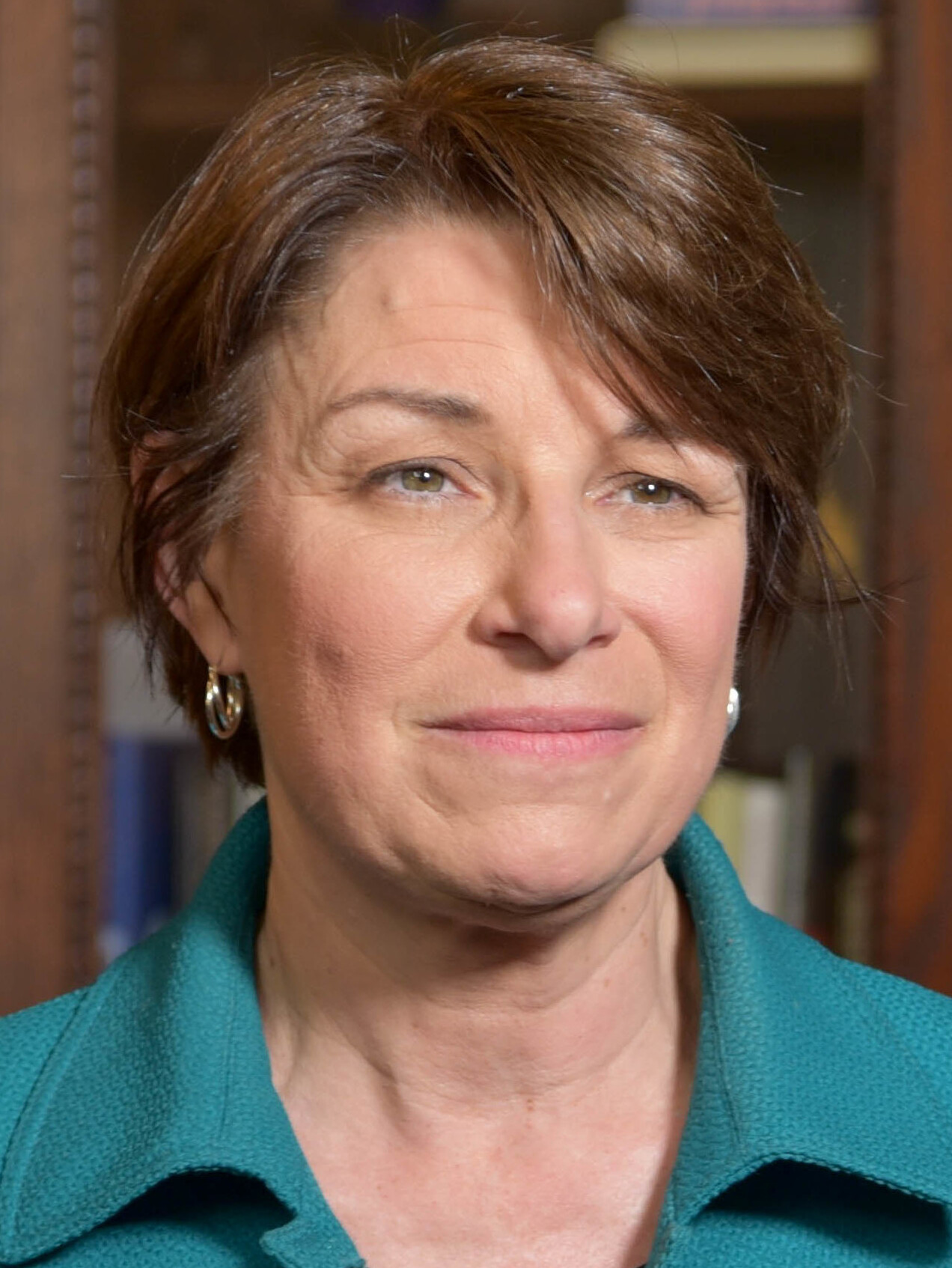
Senator
Amy Klobuchar
from Minnesota

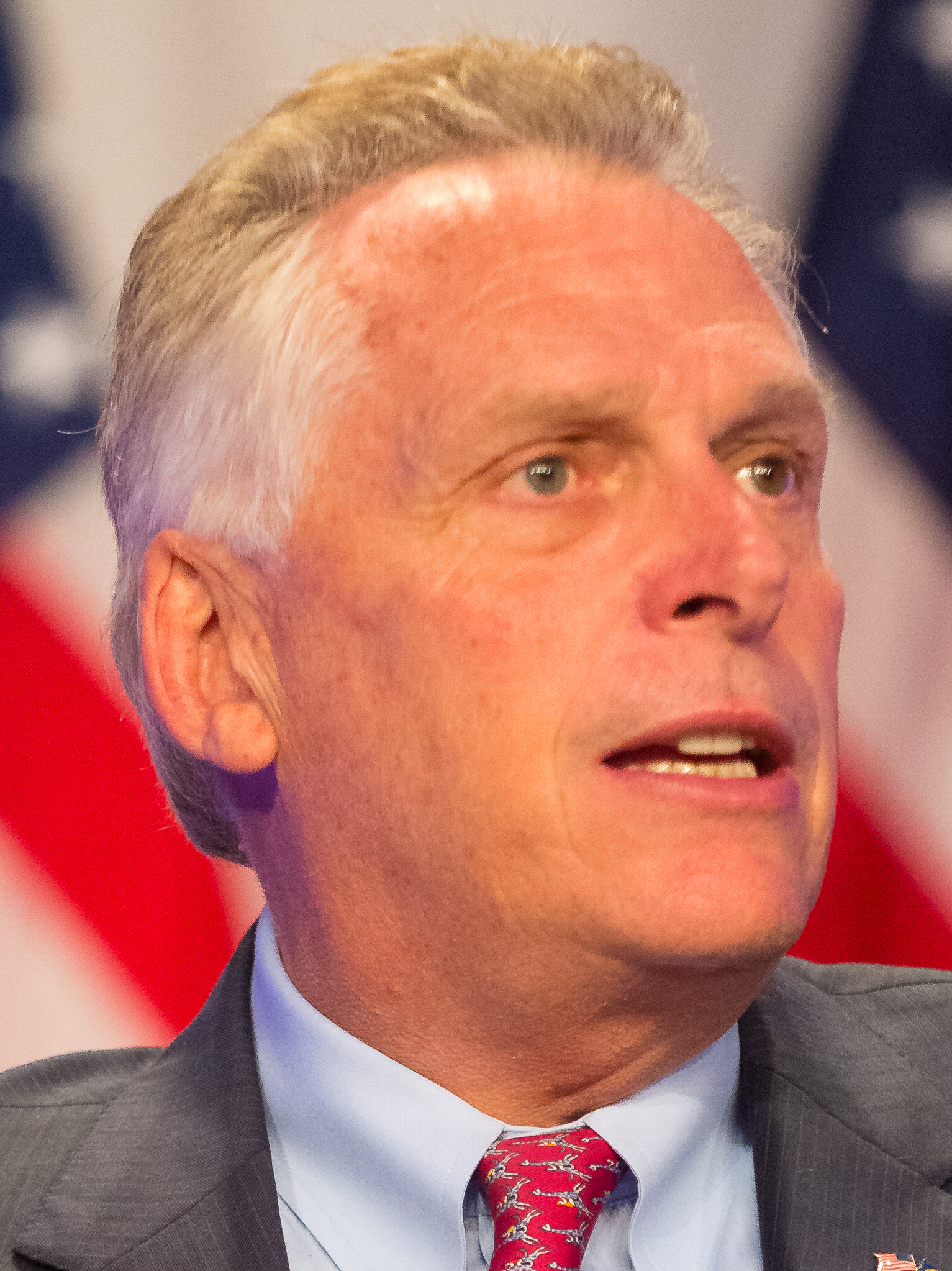
Governor
Terry McAuliffe
of Virginia

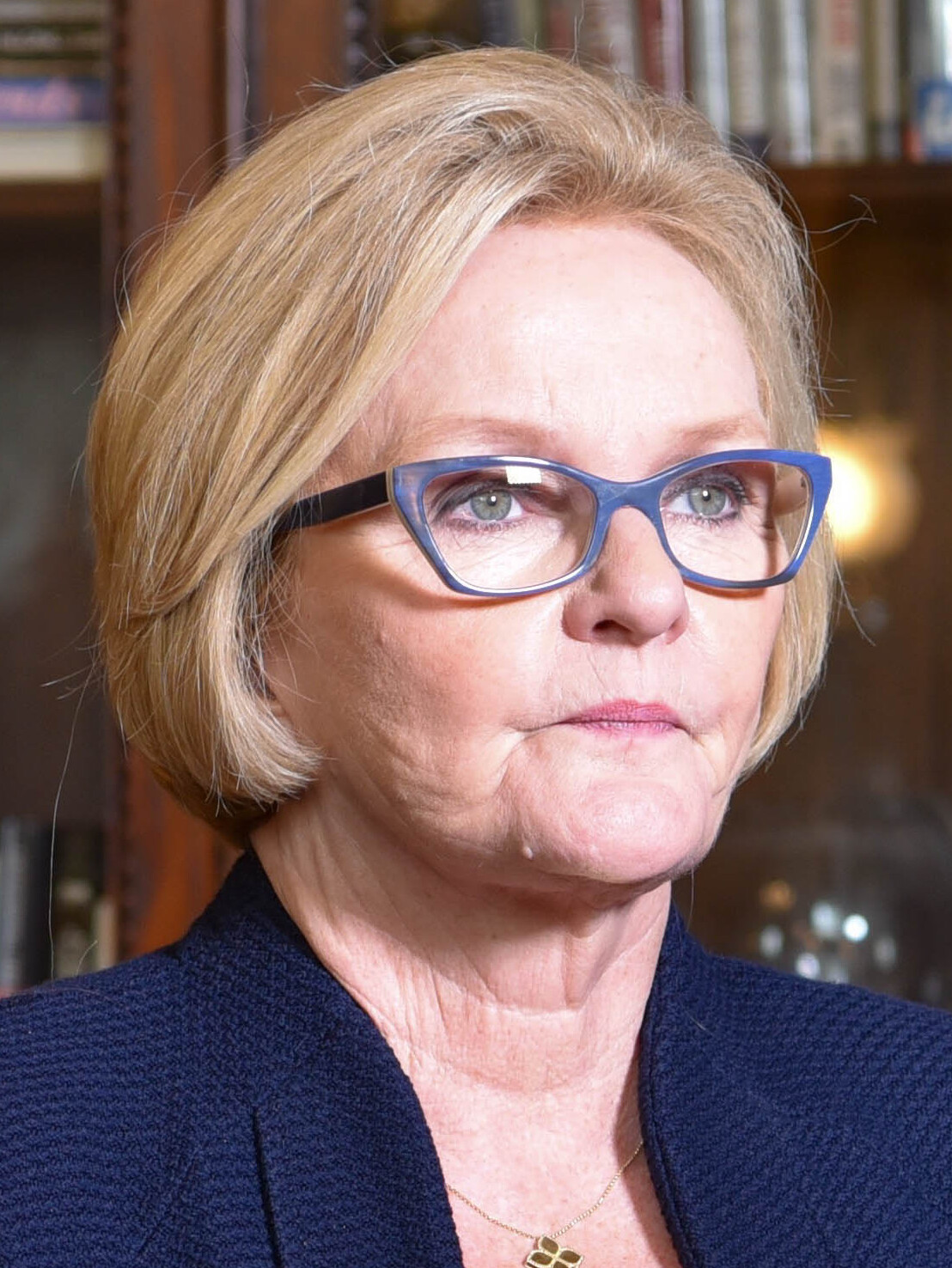
Senator
Claire McCaskill
from Missouri

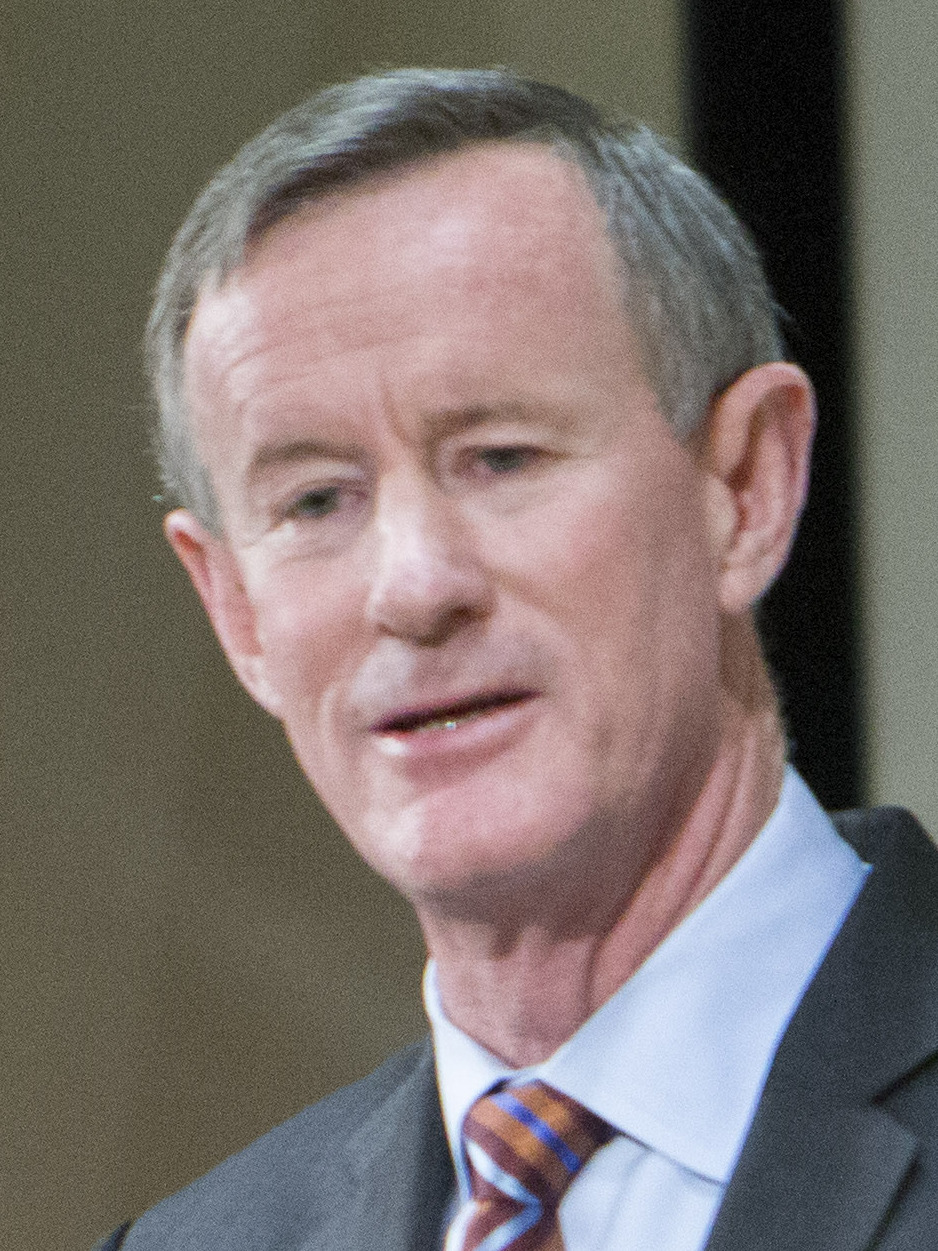
Retired U.S. Navy Admiral and chancellor of The University of Texas
Bill McRaven

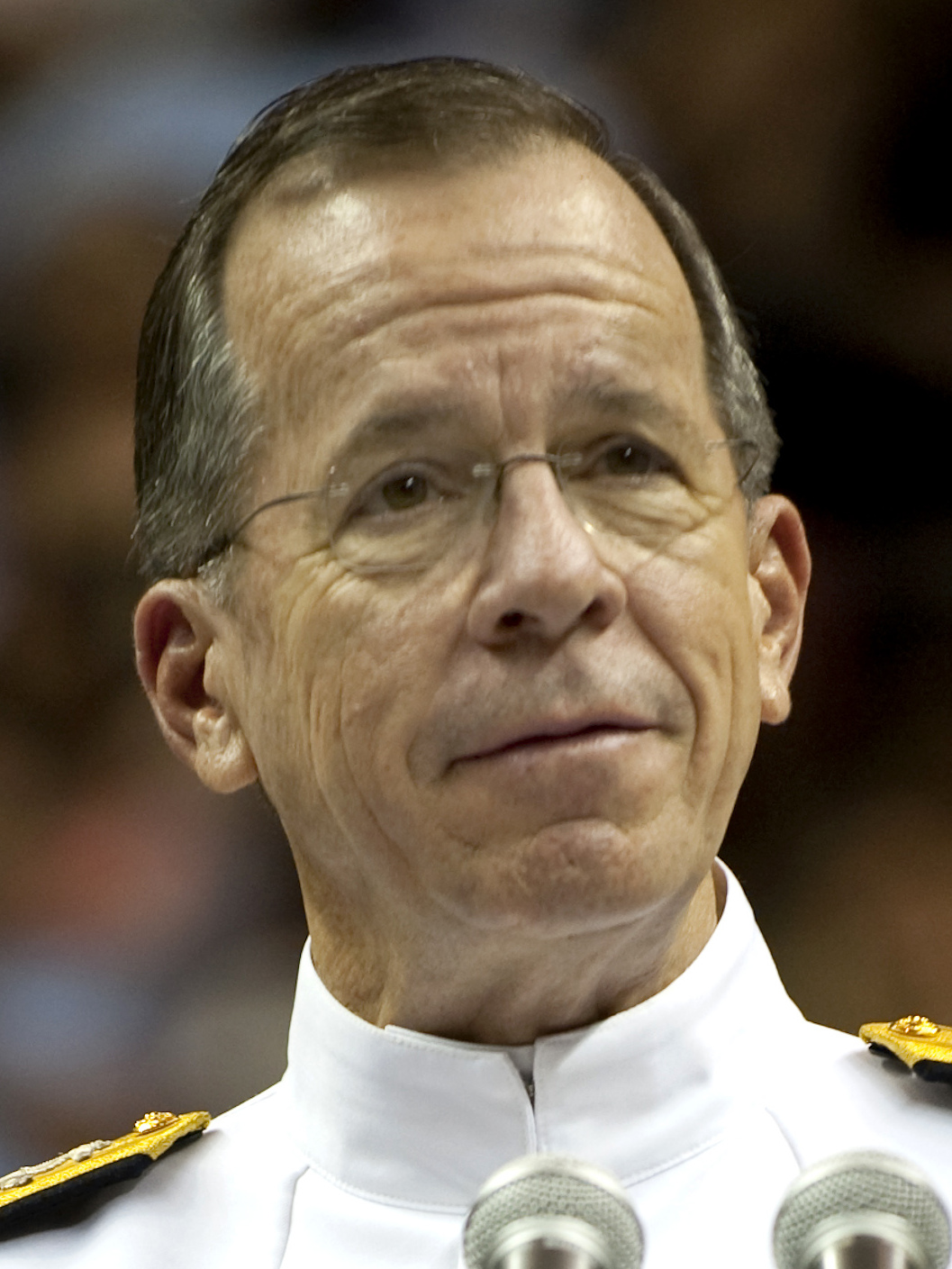
Former Chairman of the Joint Chiefs of Staff
Michael Mullen

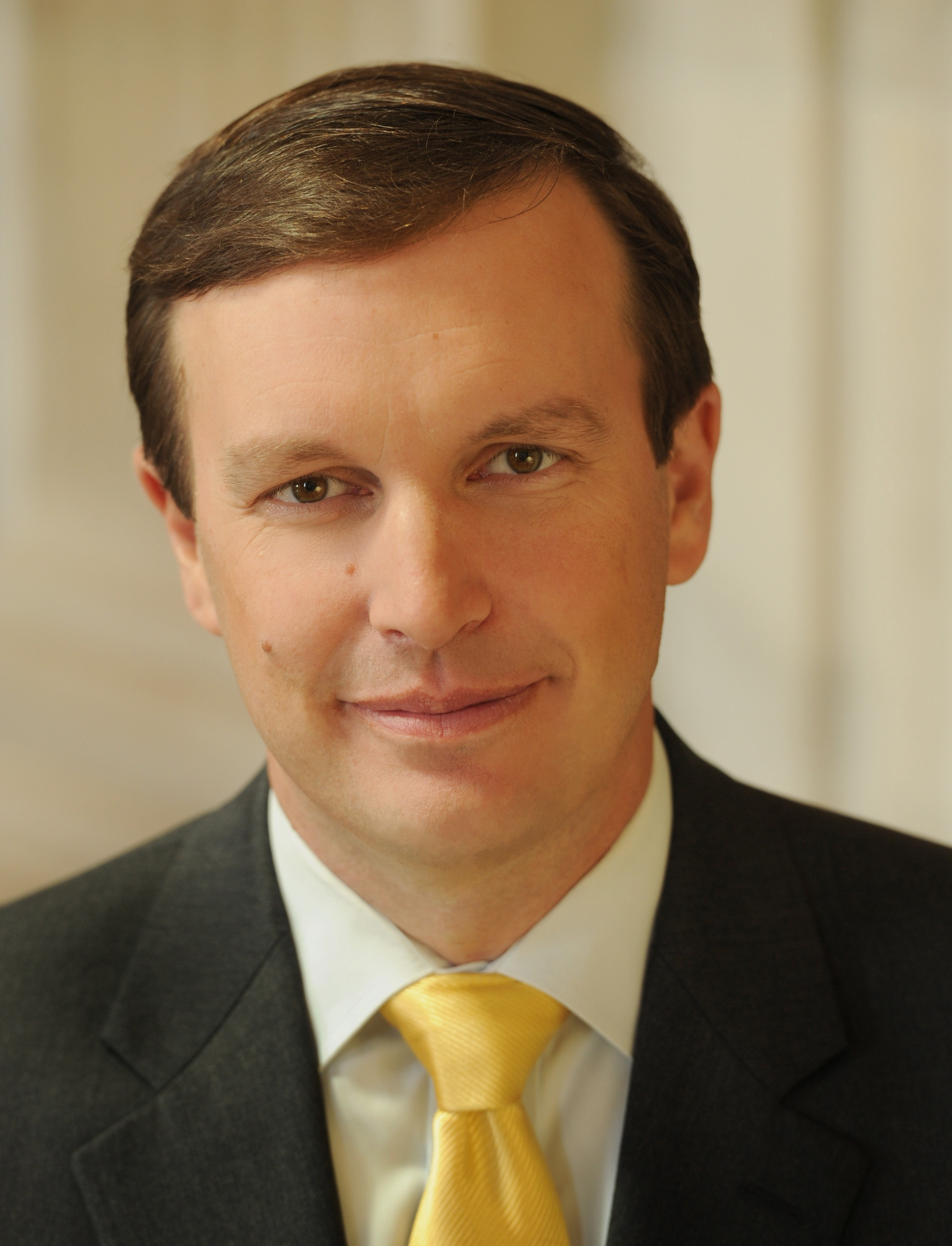
Senator
Chris Murphy
from Connecticut

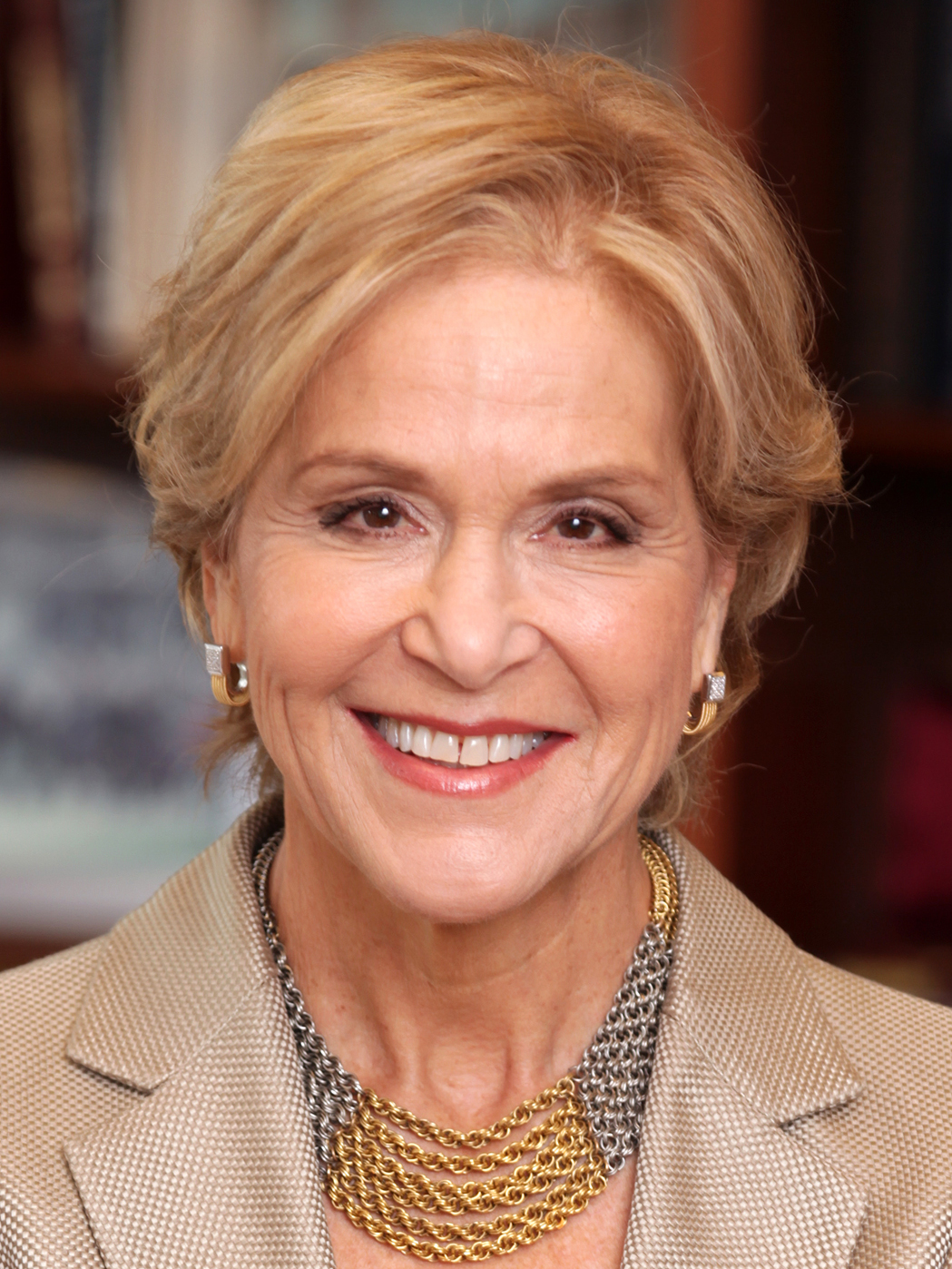
President of The Rockefeller Foundation
Judith Rodin
from Pennsylvania

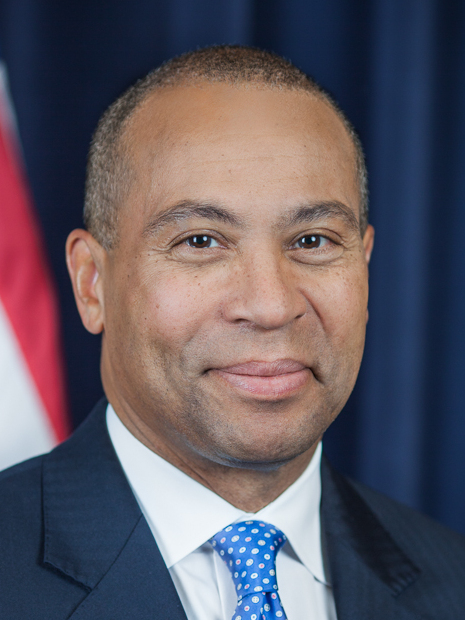
Former Governor
Deval Patrick
of Massachusetts

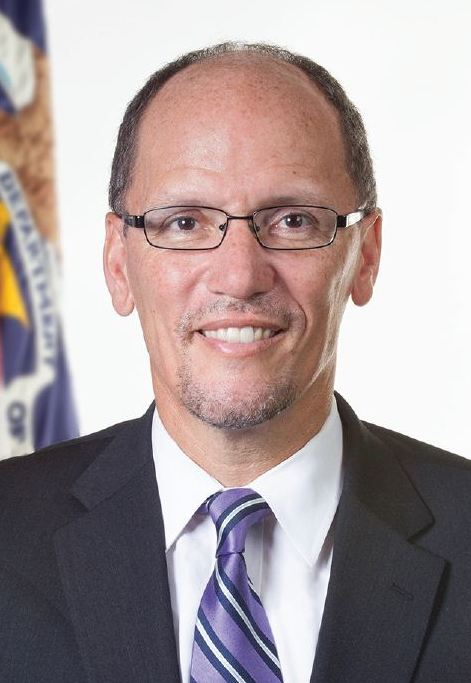
Secretary of Labor
Tom Perez
from Maryland

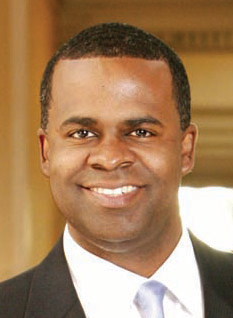
Mayor of Atlanta
Kasim Reed
from Georgia

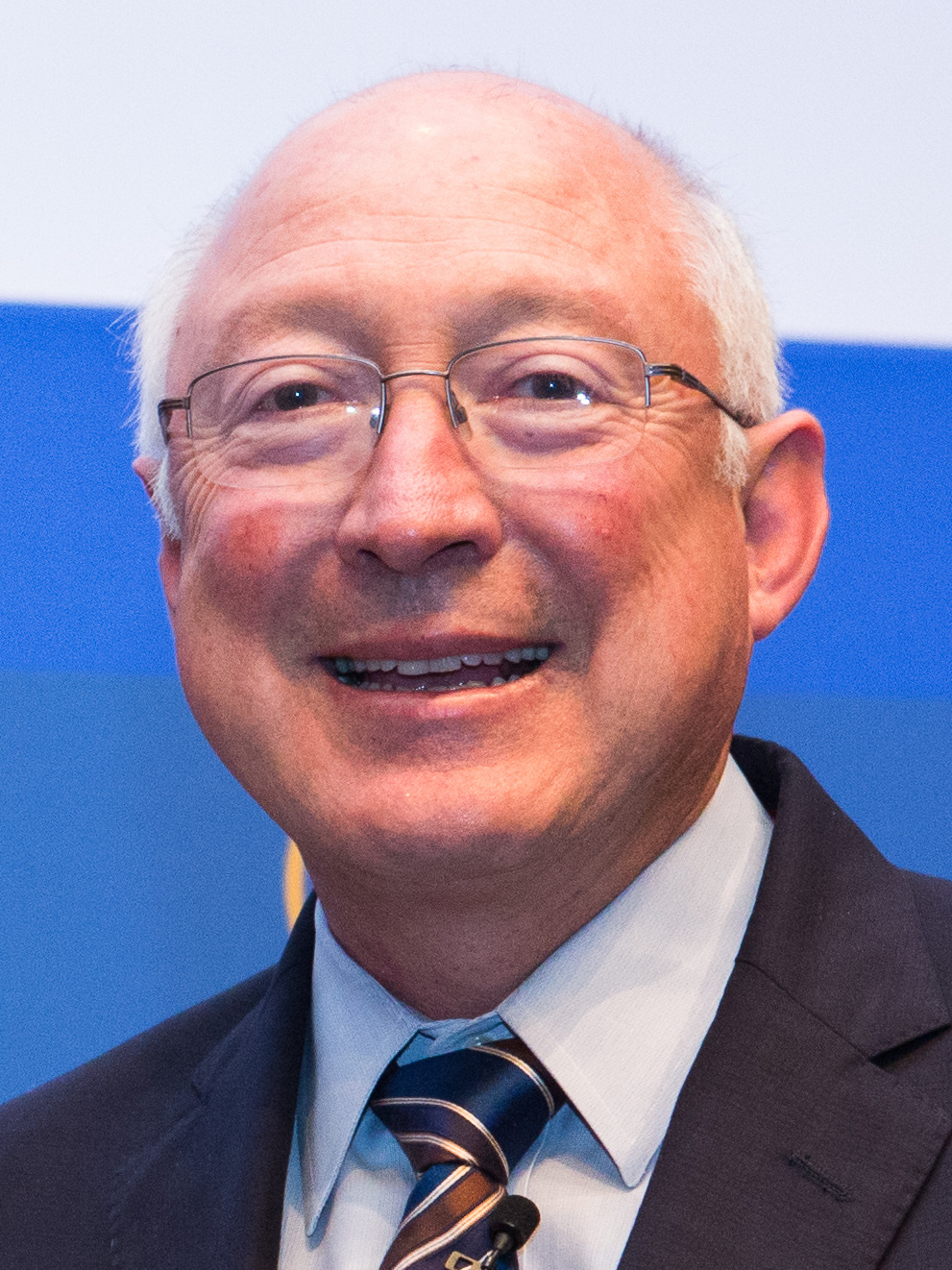
Former Secretary of the Interior
Ken Salazar
from Colorado

Senator and
2016 presidential candidate
Bernie Sanders
from Vermont

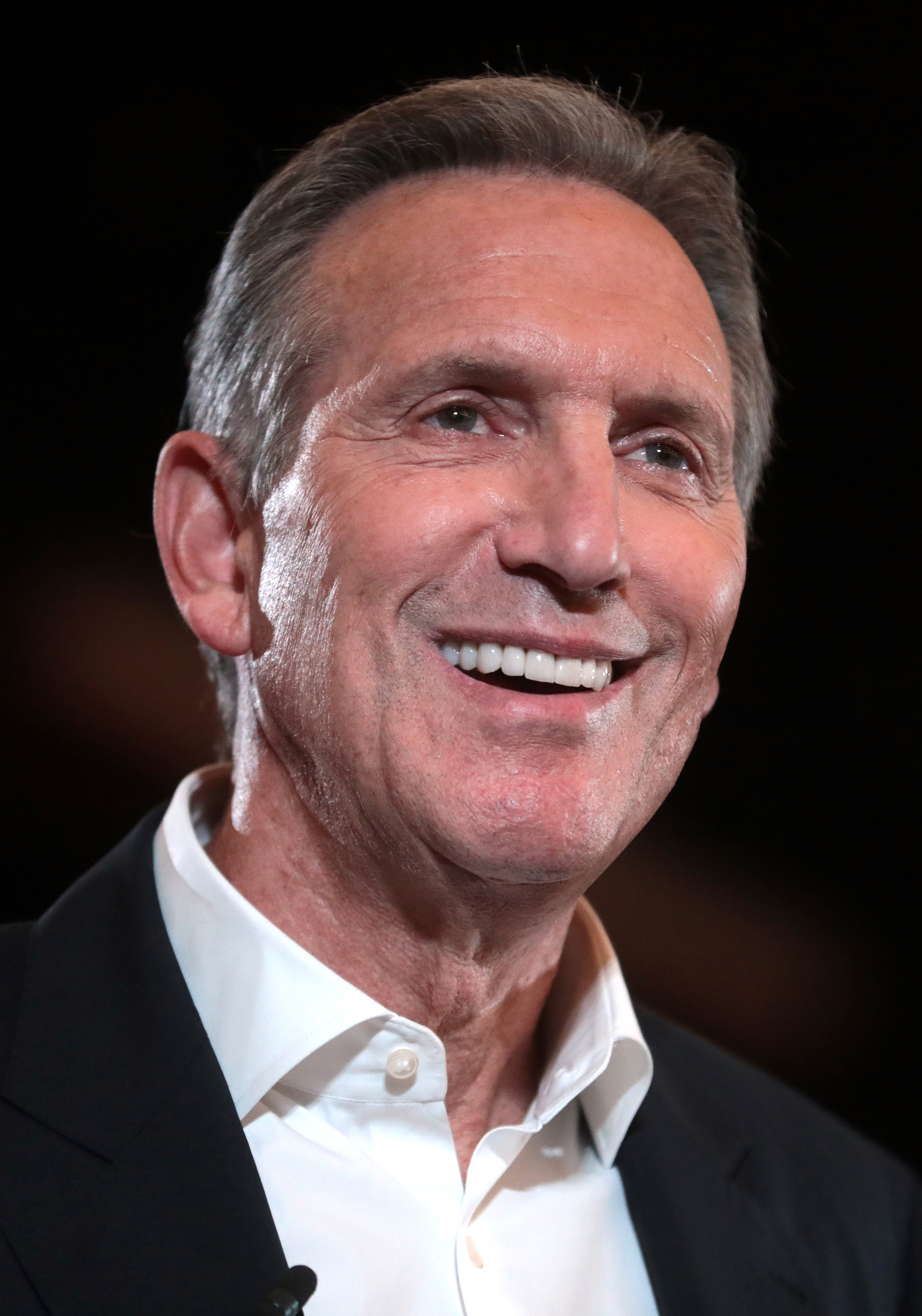
CEO of Starbucks
Howard Schultz
from Washington

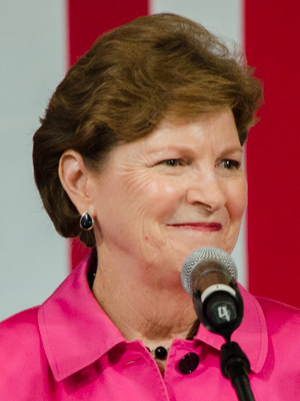
Senator
Jeanne Shaheen
from New Hampshire

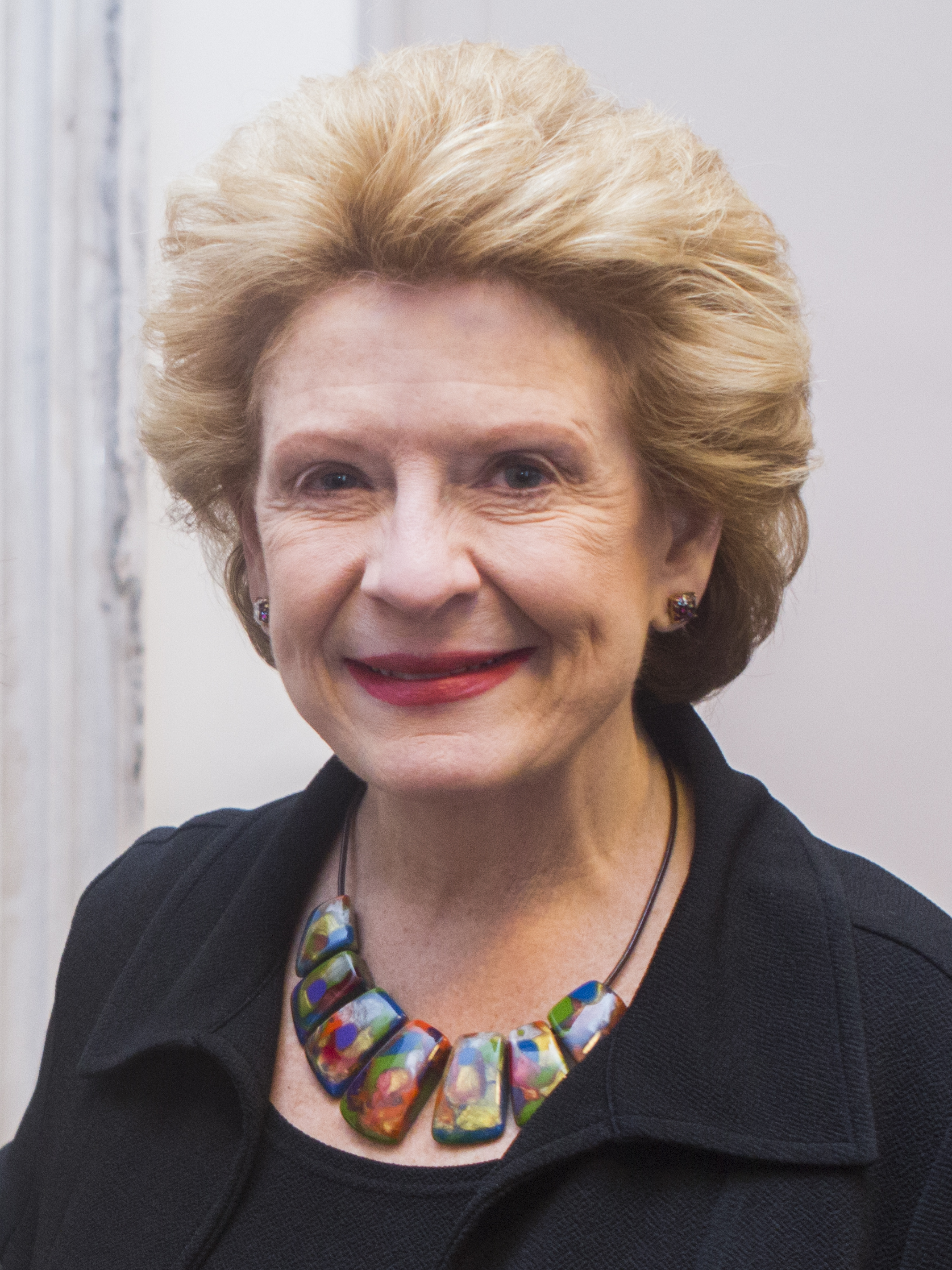
Senator
Debbie Stabenow
from Michigan

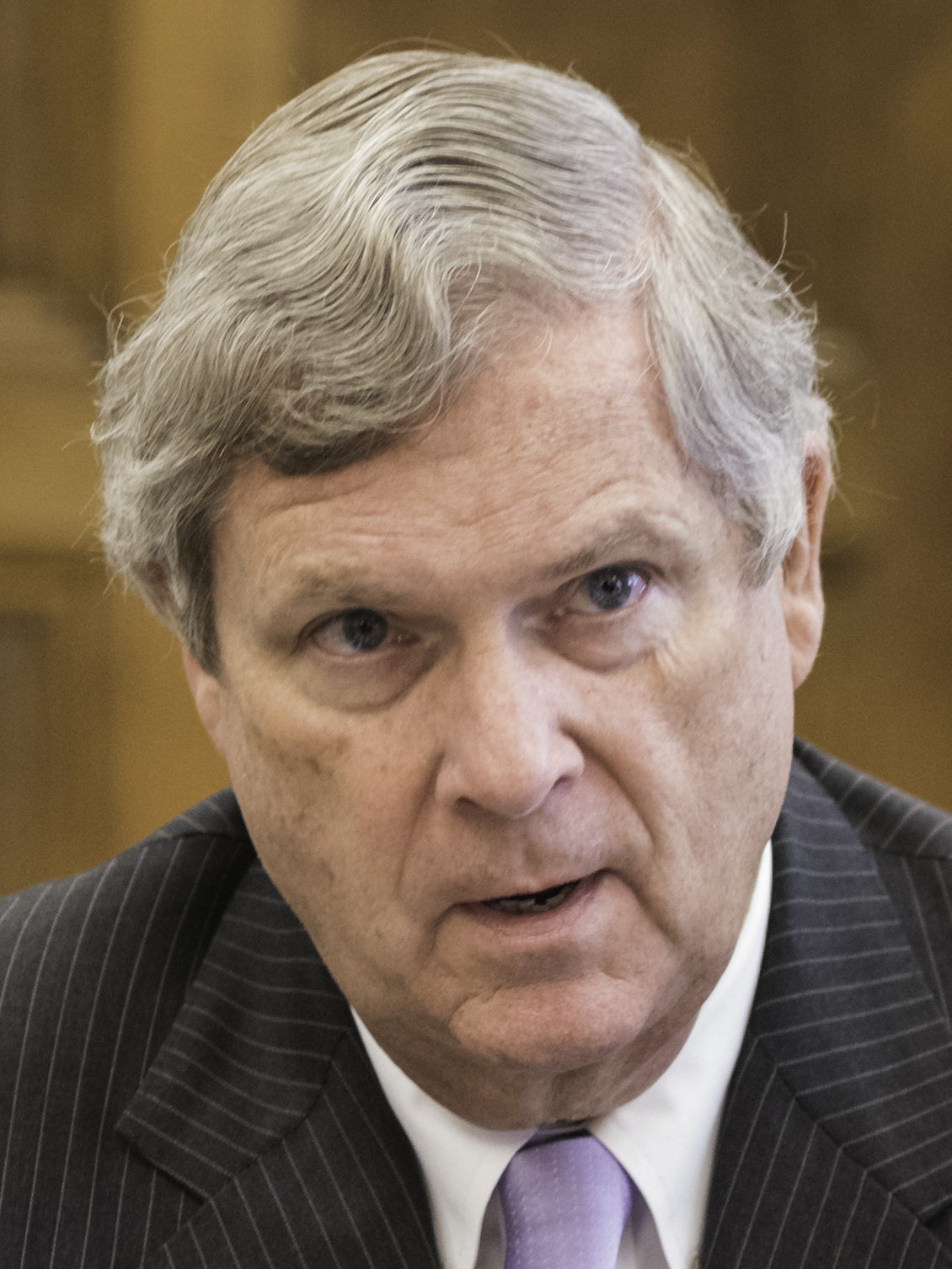
Secretary of Agriculture
Tom Vilsack
from Iowa

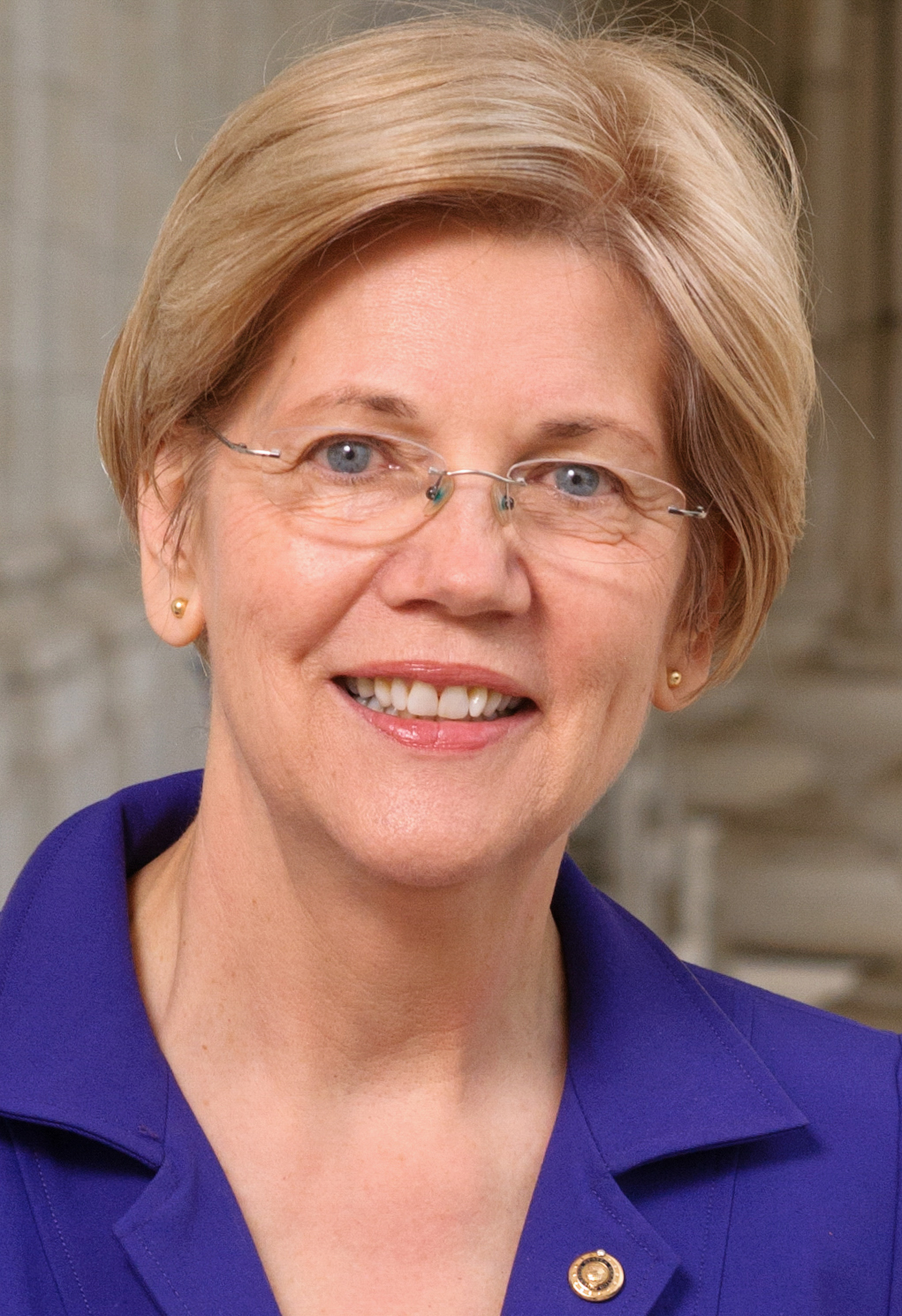
Senator
Elizabeth Warren
from Massachusetts

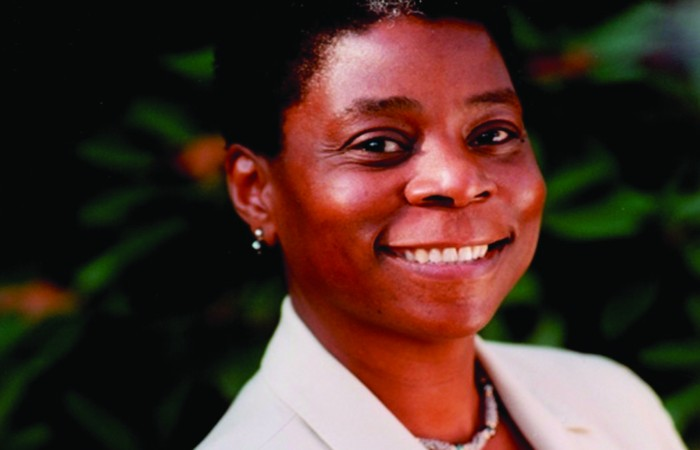
CEO of Xerox
Ursula Burns
from New York

== Other speculated candidates ==
The following individuals received coverage as potential running mates from multiple news sources. These individuals do not appear on the short list above or on the Wikileaks list.

=== Cabinet members ===
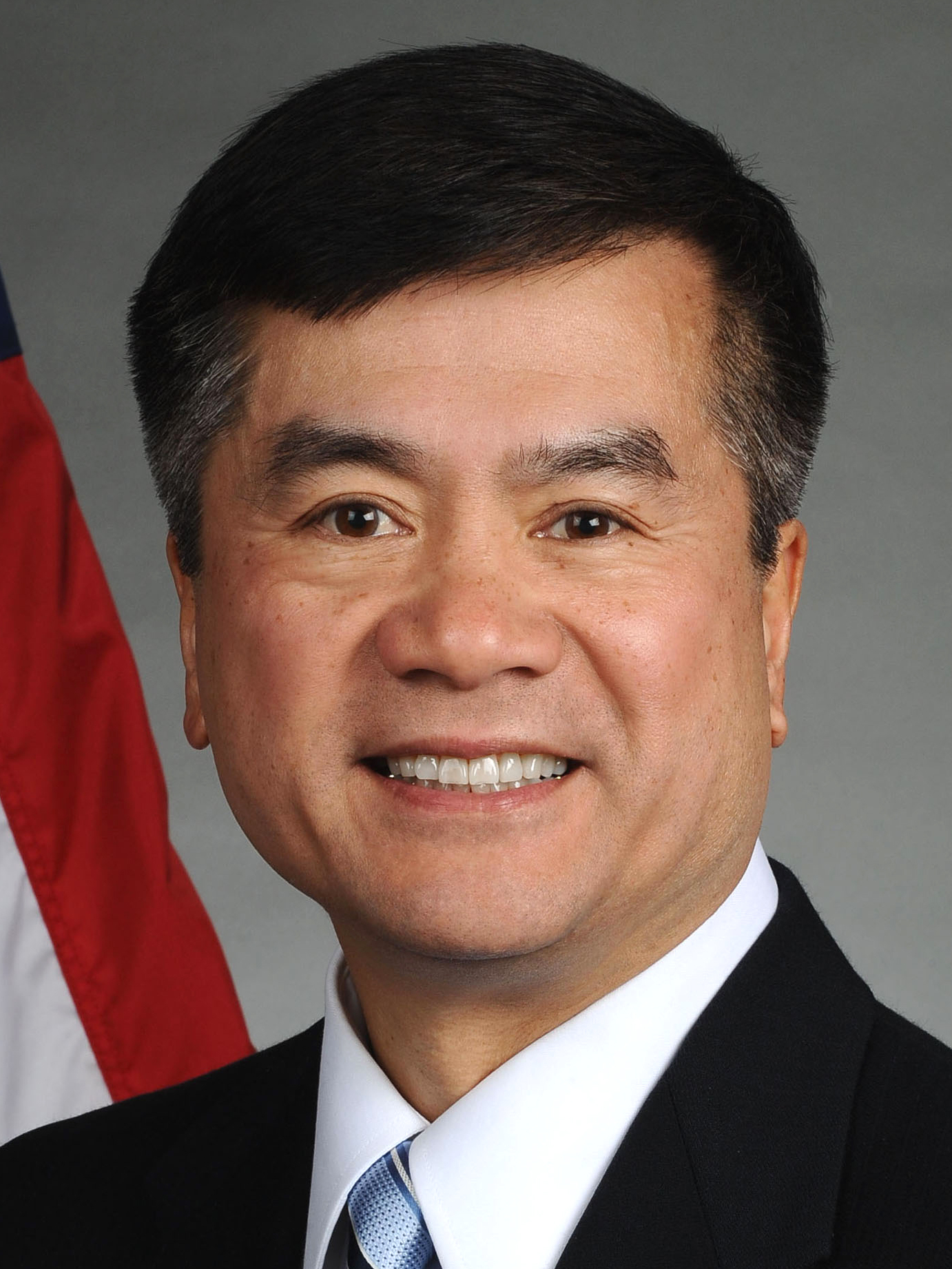
Former Secretary of Commerce
Gary Locke
from Washington
(2009–2011)

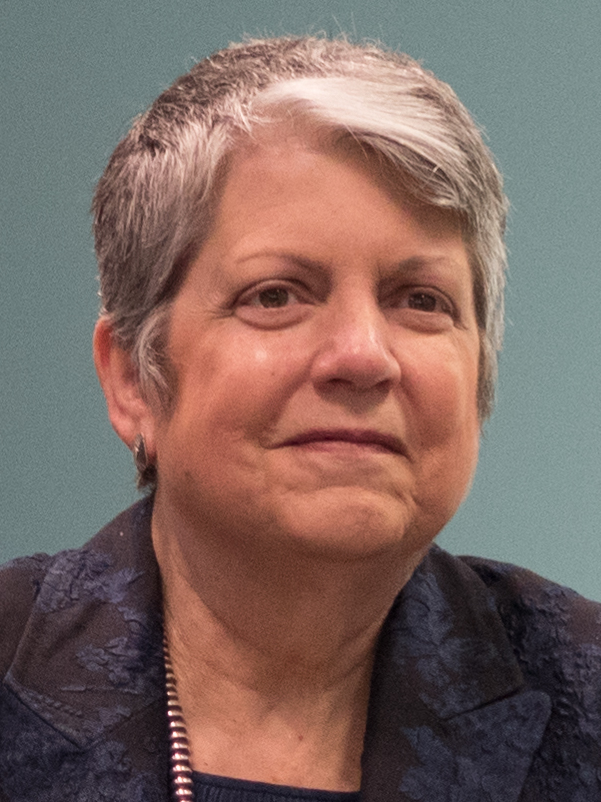
Former Secretary of Homeland Security
Janet Napolitano
of Arizona
(2009–2013)

=== Members of Congress ===
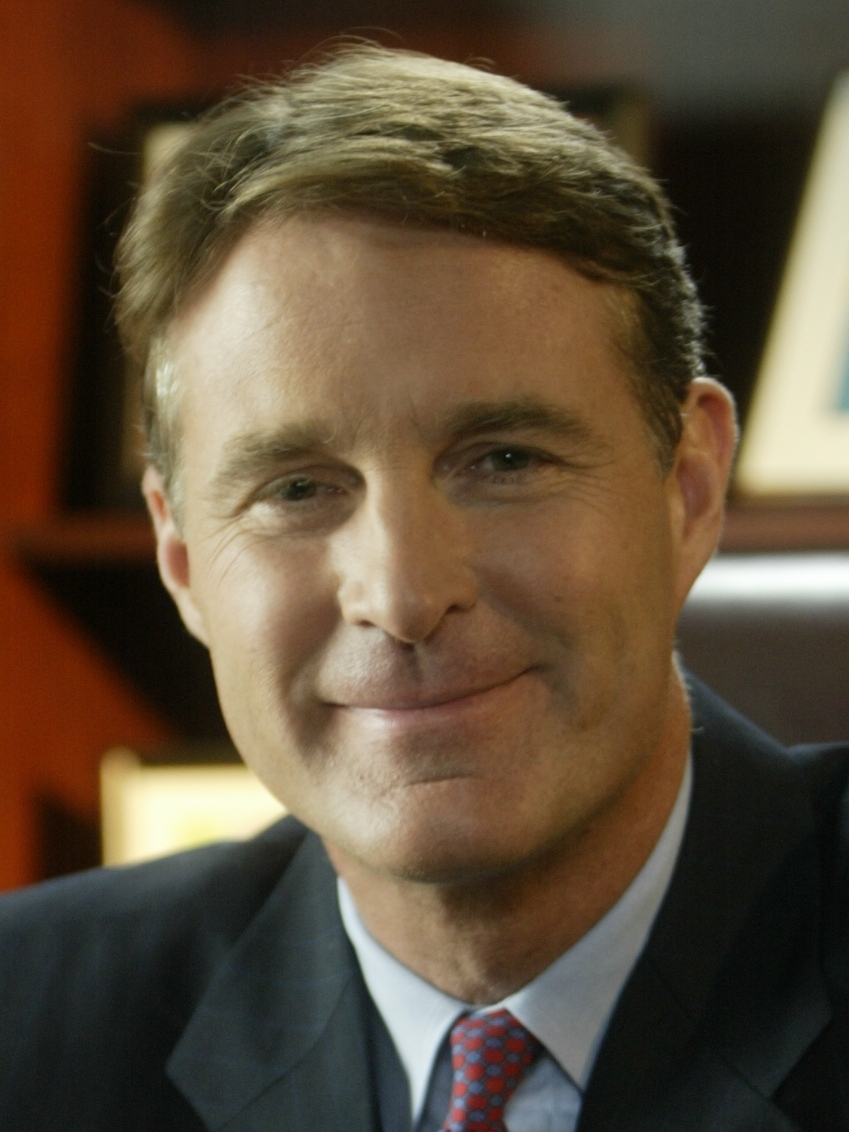
Former Senator
Evan Bayh
from Indiana
(1999–2011)

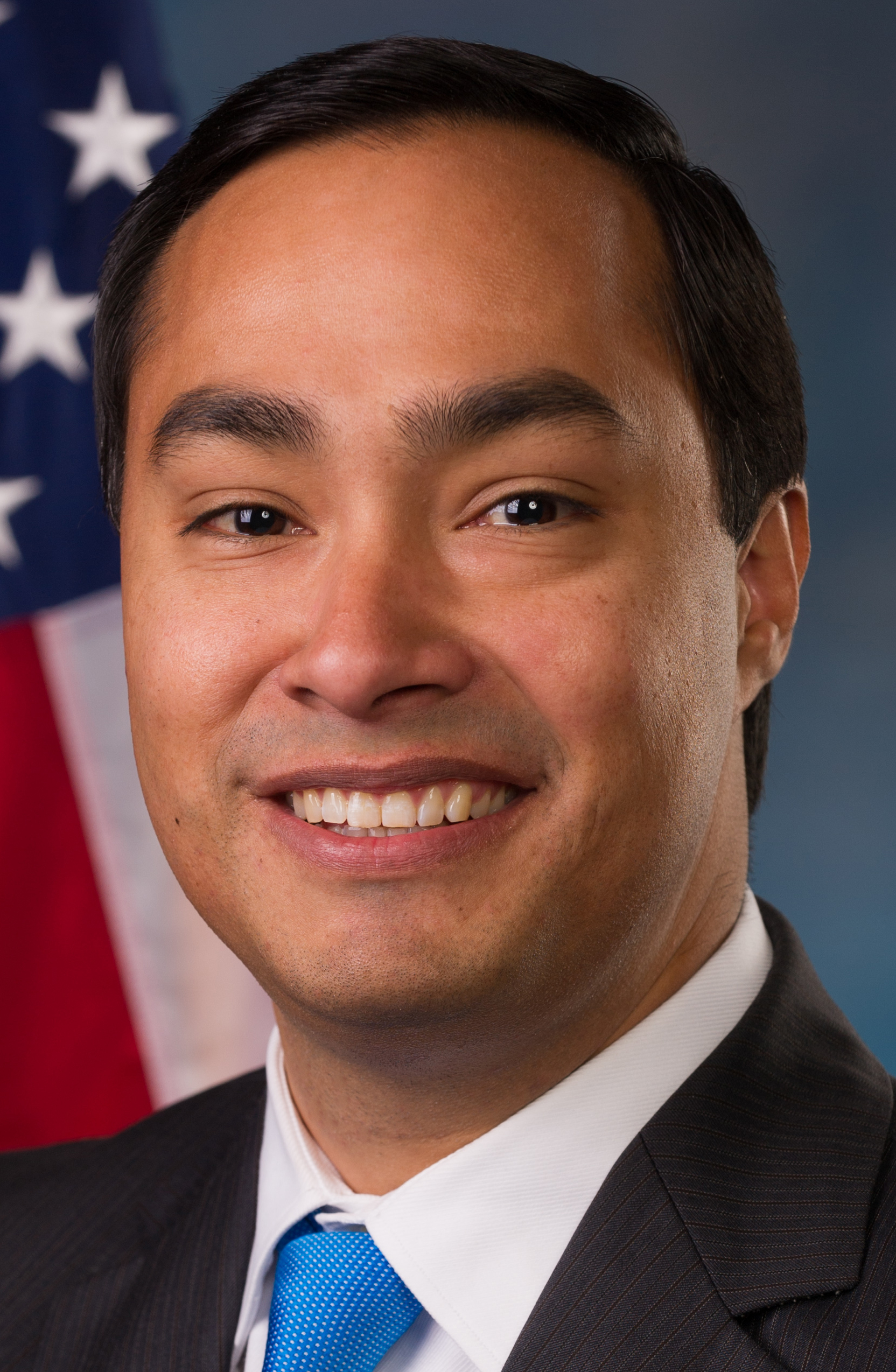
Representative
Joaquín Castro
from Texas
(2013–present)

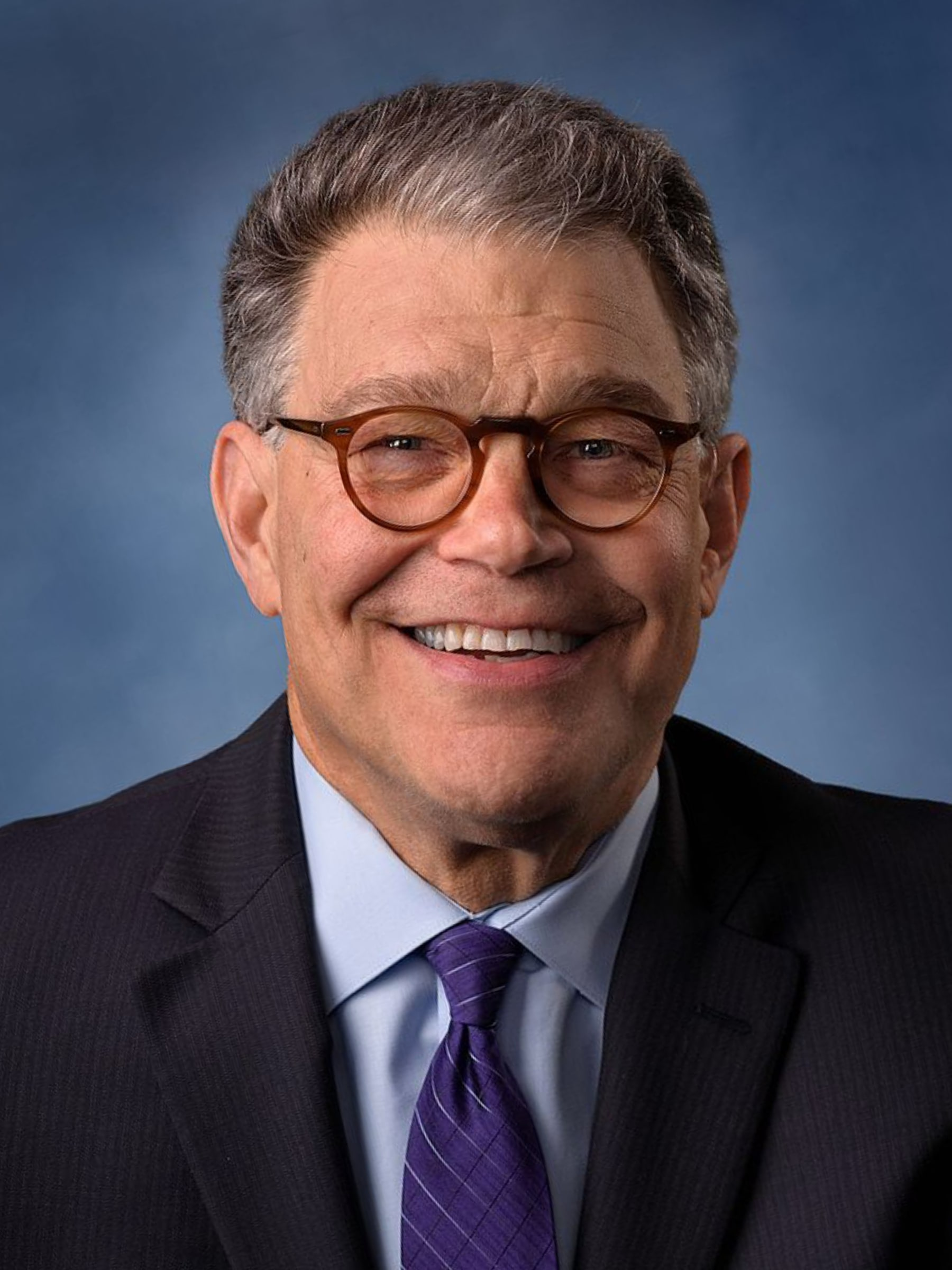
Senator
Al Franken
from Minnesota
(2009–2018)

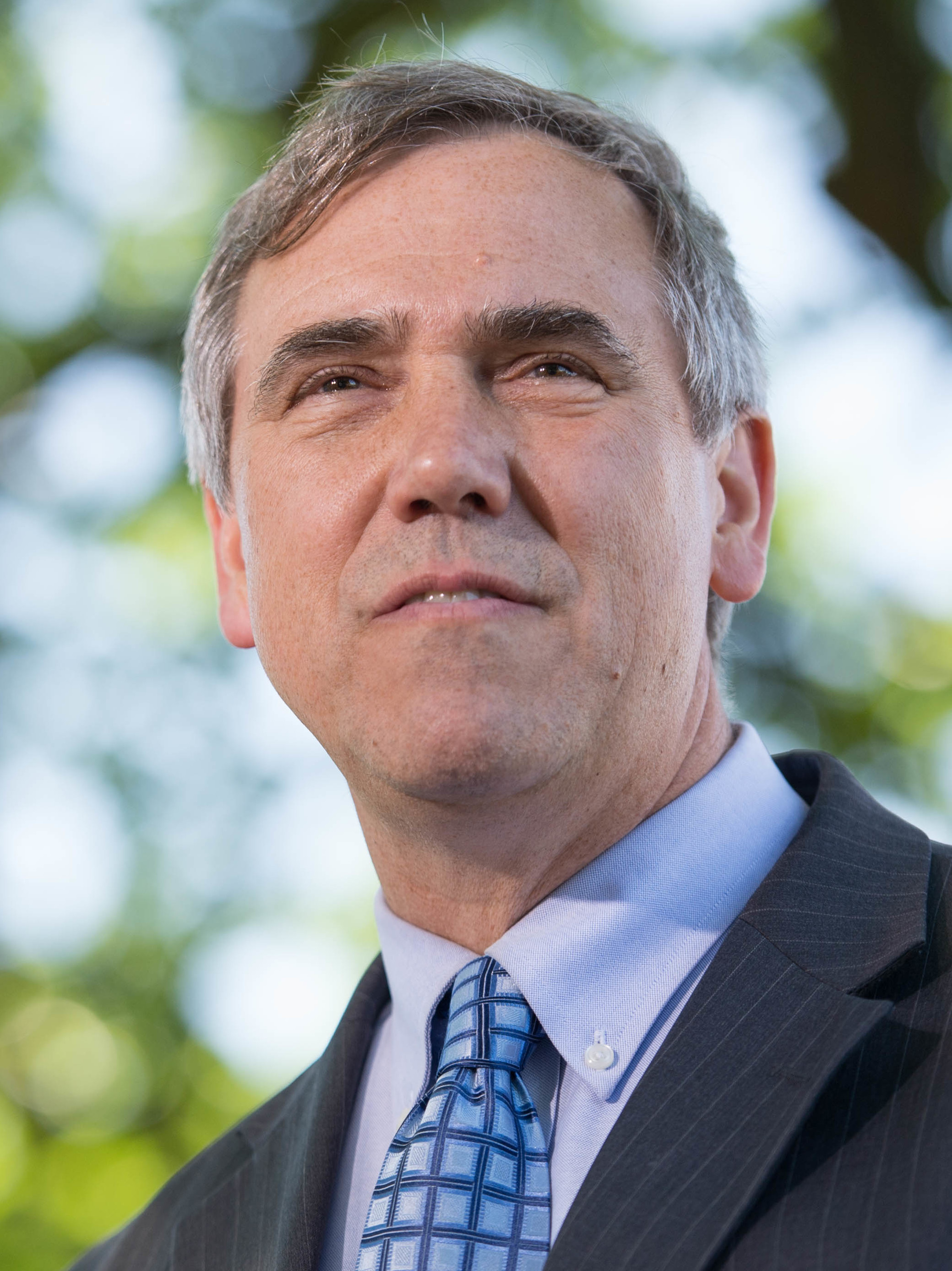
Senator
Jeff Merkley
from Oregon
(2009–present)

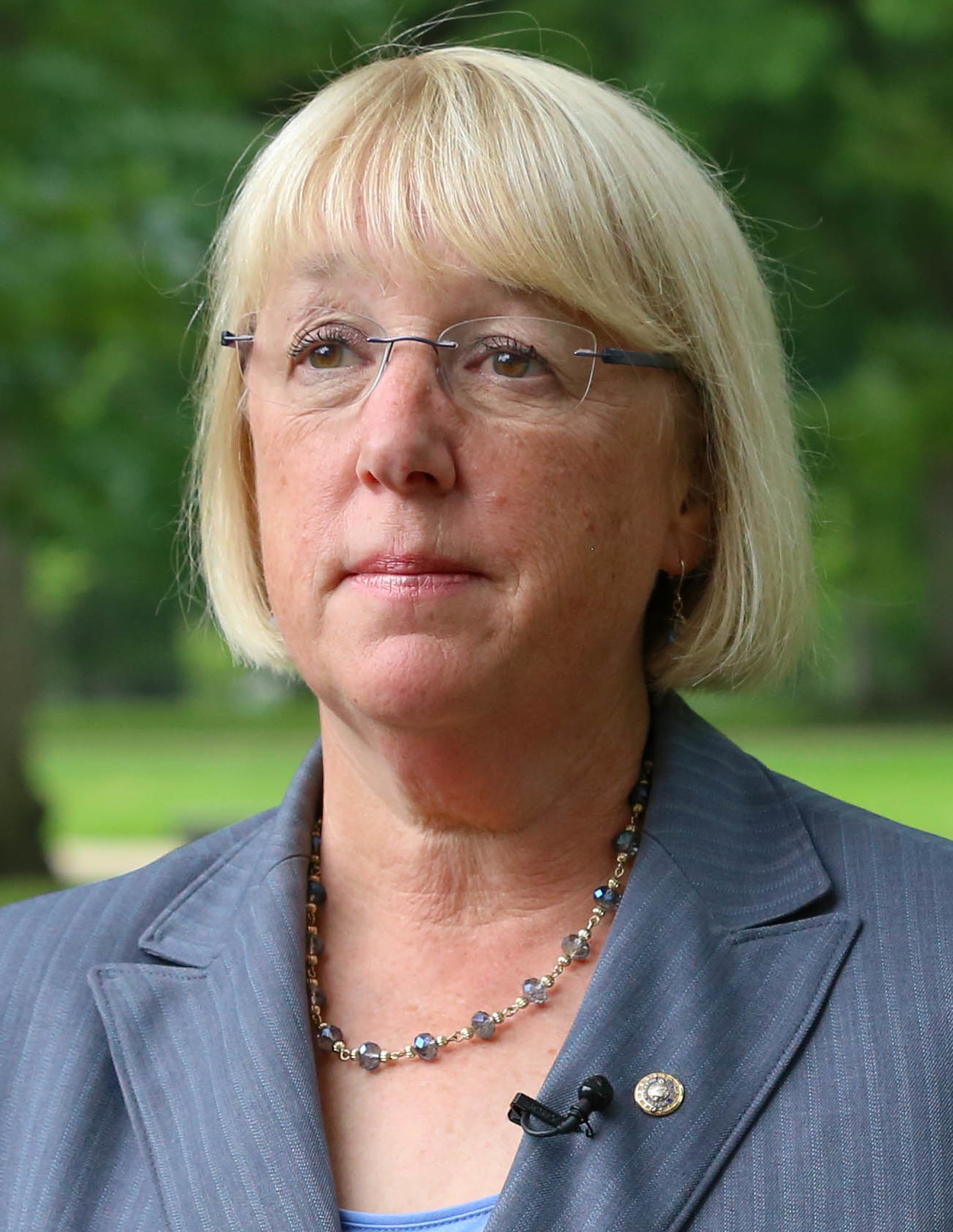
Senator
Patty Murray
from Washington
(1993–present)

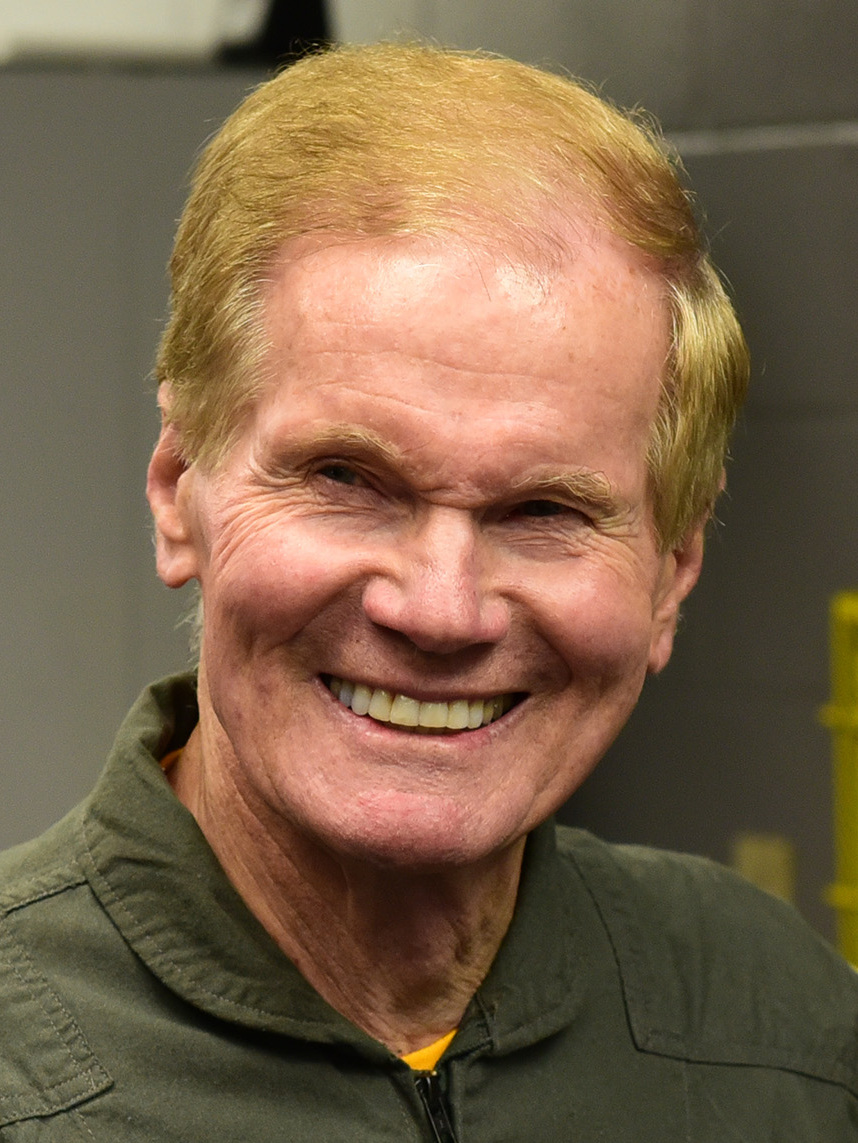
Senator
Bill Nelson
from Florida
(2001–2019)

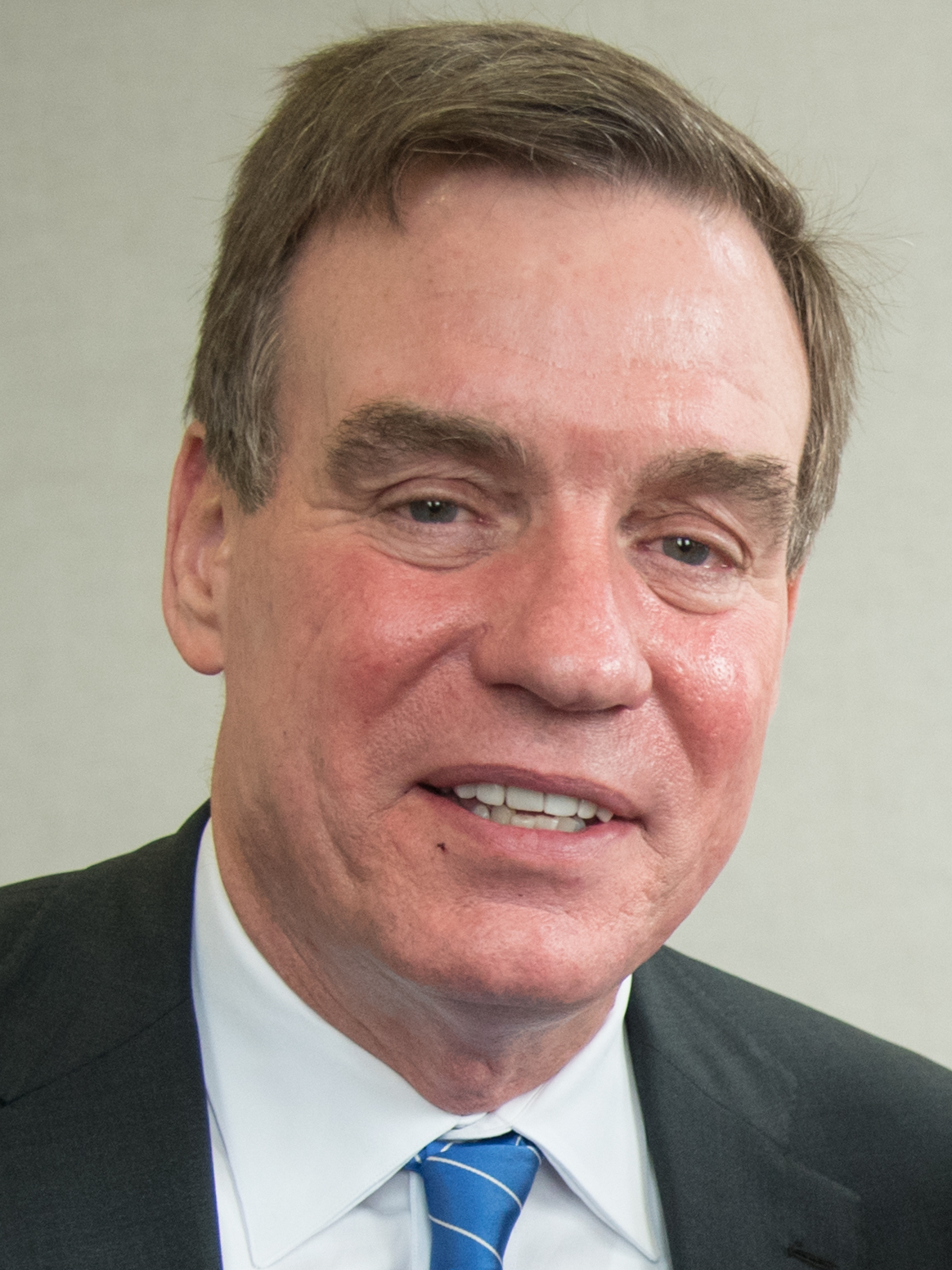
Senator
Mark Warner
from Virginia
(2009–present)

=== Governors ===
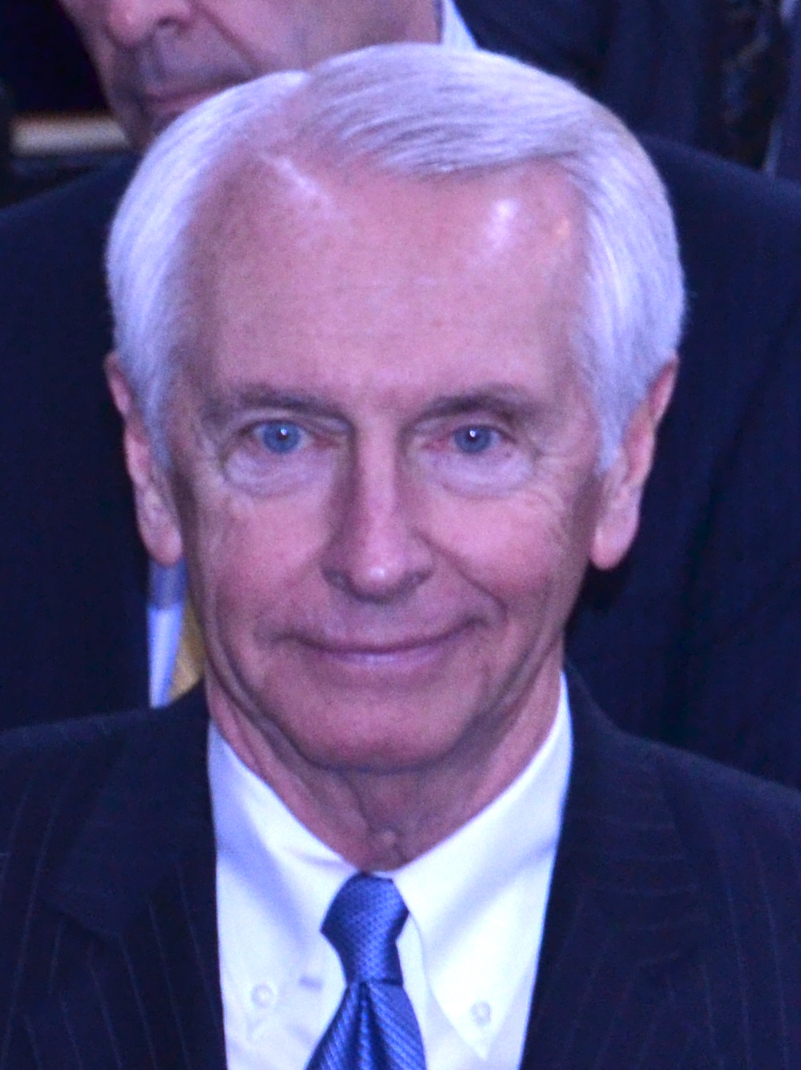
Former Governor
Steve Beshear
of Kentucky
(2007–2015)

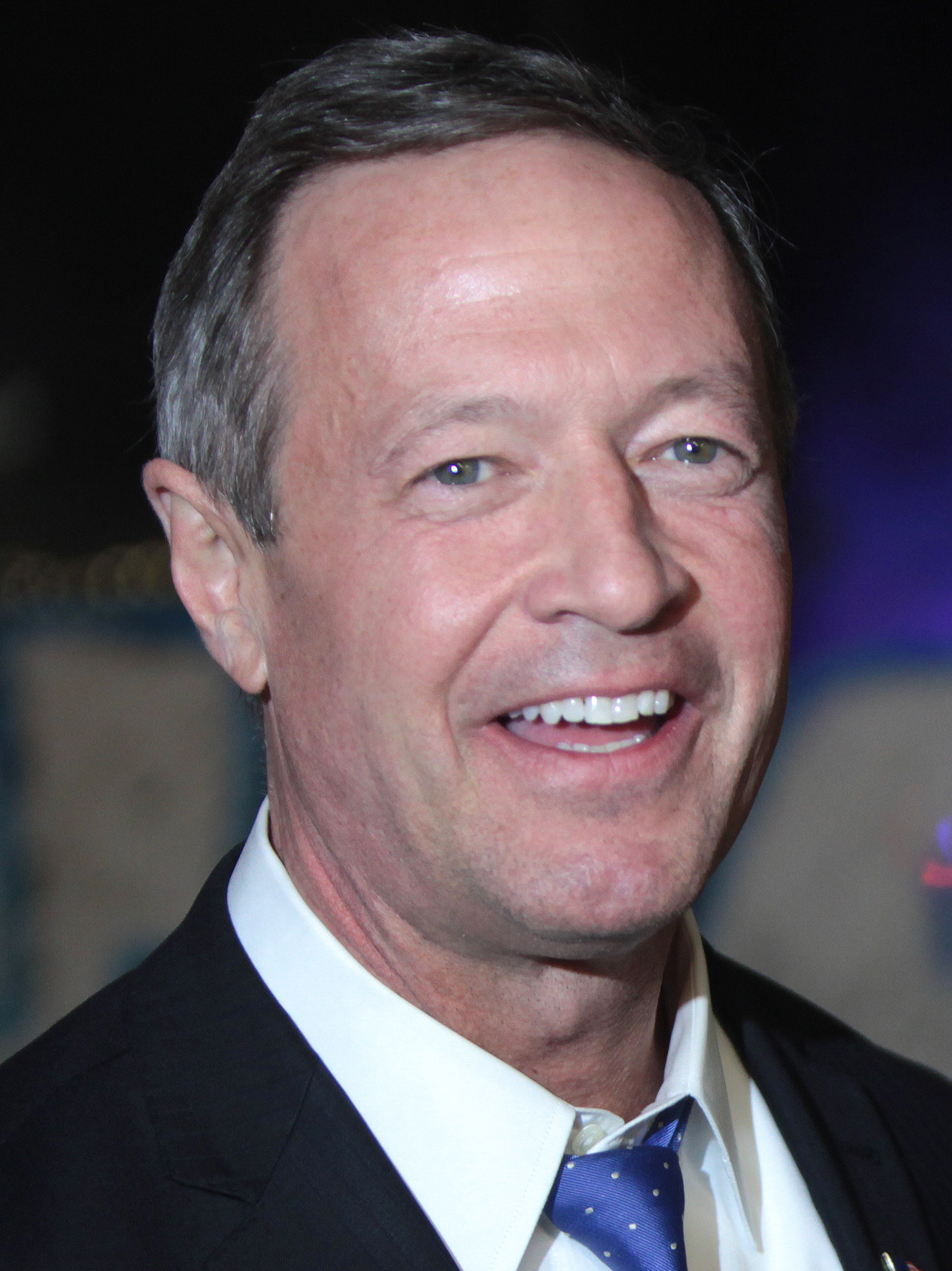
Former Governor
and 2016 presidential candidate
Martin O'Malley
of Maryland
(2007–2015)

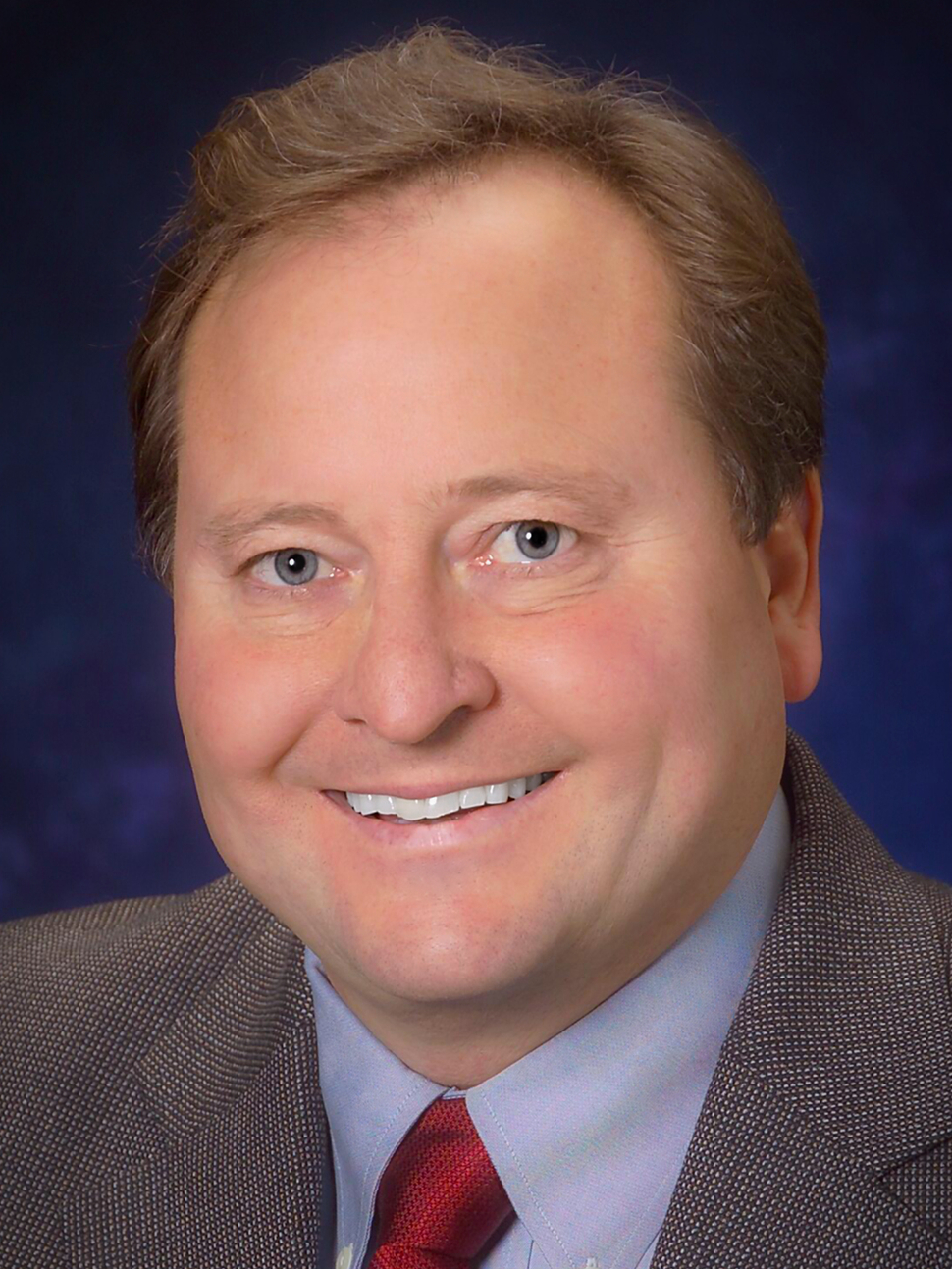
Former Governor
Brian Schweitzer
of Montana
(2005–2013)

=== Other individuals ===
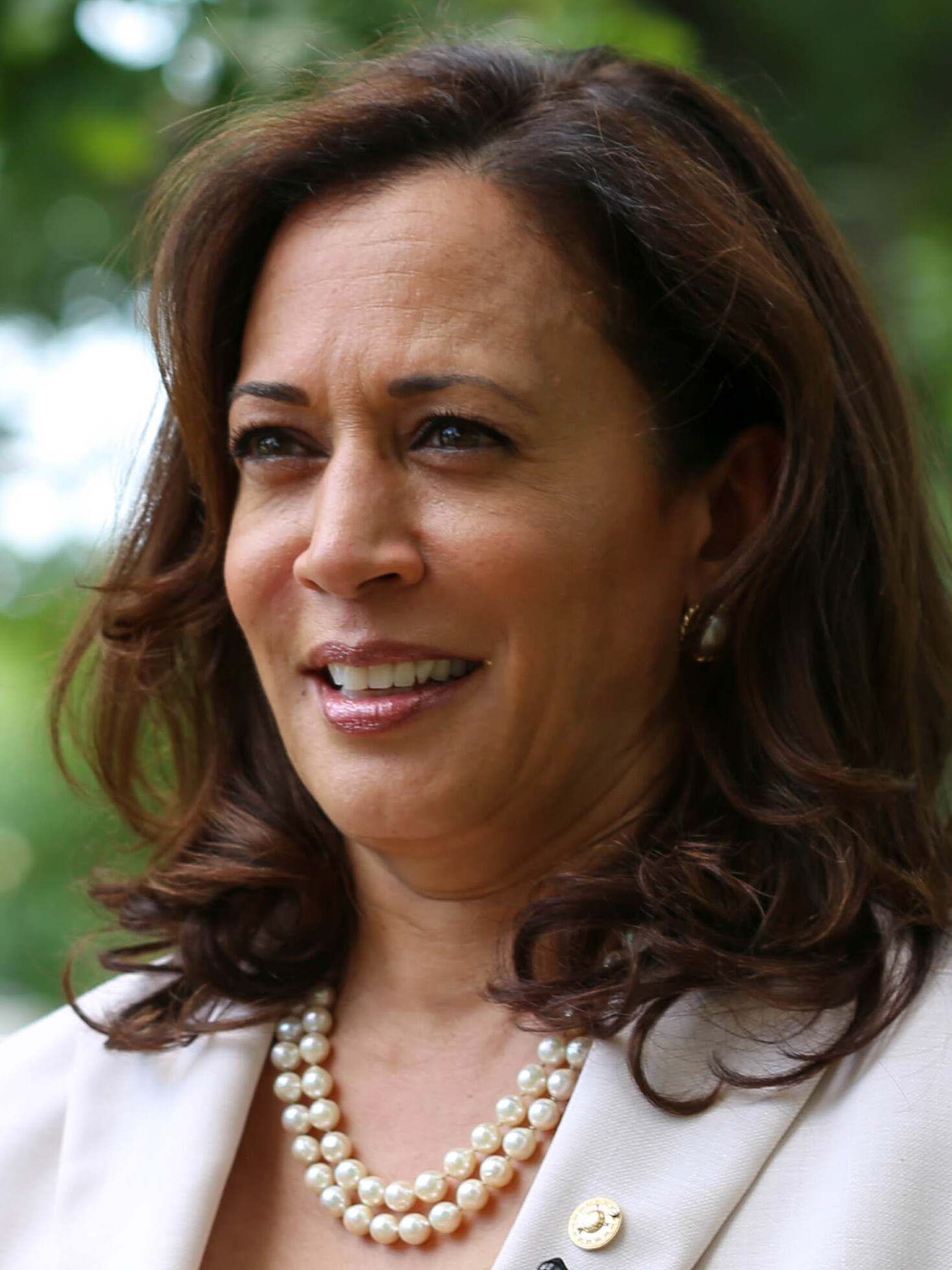
California Attorney General
Kamala Harris (Note: Harris was the vice presidential nominee for the 2020 election, and served as vice president from 2021 to 2025.)
from California
(2011–2017)

== See also ==
- Hillary Clinton 2016 presidential campaign
- 2016 Democratic Party presidential candidates
- 2016 Democratic Party presidential primaries
- 2016 Democratic National Convention
- 2016 United States presidential election
- List of United States major party presidential tickets
