= Heather Booth =

American civil rights activist and strategist, feminist (born 1945)

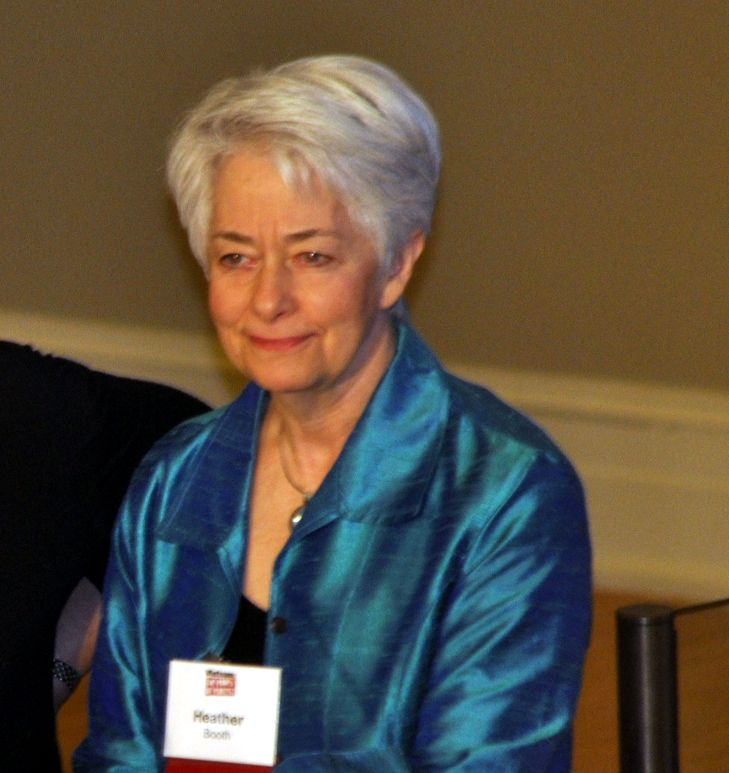
- Heather Booth in documentary by Lilly Rivlin, 2016.
- Born: December 15, 1945 (age 80); Brookhaven, Mississippi
- Education: University of Chicago (BA, MA)
- Known for: Progressive activist, community organizer, political consultant

Heather Booth (born December 15, 1945) is an American civil rights activist, feminist, and political strategist who has been involved in activism for progressive causes. During her student years, she was active in both the civil rights movement and feminist causes. Since then she has had a career involving feminism, community organization, and progressive politics.

== Early life and family ==
Booth was born in a military hospital in Brookhaven, Mississippi, on December 15, 1945, during a period in which her father was serving as an Army doctor. Soon after her birth, her family moved to Bensonhurst, Brooklyn, where she received her elementary education in P.S. 200 in the Bath Beach neighborhood. Later, she attended high school in Long Island's North Shore after her family had moved to that upscale area. She has two brothers, David and Jonathan. Booth said that she grew up in a warm, loving, and supportive family, and that her parents taught her the importance of recognizing injustice and acting to correct it. From her Jewish upbringing, Booth learned to take on responsibility for building a society that reflected these goals.

After her family had moved to Long Island, Booth's mother, using Betty Friedan's 1963 book The Feminine Mystique, made her aware of the growing discontent of prosperous suburban housewives with the conventionally narrow lives they led. In high school, she joined a sorority and the cheerleading team but left both of them when she came to believe that their members were discriminating against students who did not lead their privileged lives. She began leafleting against the death penalty. In 1960, she joined the Congress of Racial Equality in a protest against the segregationist policies of the Woolworth's chain.

Upon graduating from high school in 1963, Booth spent the summer traveling in Israel and that fall enrolled as a freshman at the University of Chicago. She chose that school in part because it had no sororities and deemphasized sports. In college, she quickly immersed herself in political activism, In 1967, she received a Bachelor of Arts degree in social sciences, then in 1970, a Master of Arts degree in educational psychology, both from the University of Chicago.

She and Paul Booth married in July 1967, shortly after she graduated from college. They had met at a sit-in protesting the University of Chicago's cooperation with the policies of the U.S. Selective Service System whose local boards were then drafting men to serve in the Vietnam War. Later that year, she was arrested during a protest at the U.S. Army induction center in Chicago. The couple had two sons, Eugene Victor Booth (born in 1968) and Daniel Garrison Booth (born in 1969). (Note: In an interview conducted in 2017, Booth explained that she and Paul decided to have children right away in part because of the draft. She said, "I had gone to my women's group, with Jo Freeman, Amy Kesselman and others and asked them if we should have kids. My husband was going to be drafted, and there was going to be a punitive draft because he was an anti-war leader. One way to get out of the draft was to have a kid. We were only married three months before we had to face this decision—it's a pretty big decision. I went to the group. They said, 'Yes, you should really do this.'" She went on to explain that the women's movement wasn't very welcoming to mothers with babies at that point.)

One of the founders of Students for a Democratic Society (SDS), Paul Booth was national secretary of the organization when they met. He helped organize the 1965 March on Washington for Peace in Vietnam, subsequently became president of the Citizen Action Program in Chicago (a group formed in 1969 by members of Alinsky's Industrial Areas Foundation), and was later a director of the Midwest Academy. Beginning in the 1980s, he held a series of positions within the American Federation of State, County and Municipal Employees union. In 2017, by then executive assistant to the union's president, he retired, continuing his political engagement by supporting Heather Booth in her work. He died January 17, 2018, from complications of chronic lymphocytic leukemia. (Note: On his retirement early in 2017, Representative Jan Schakowsky inserted into the Congressional Record an appreciation of Paul Booth's "contributions to the progressive movement as an activist, organizer, mentor and leader," praising the "rich legacy and a lasting record of achievement" that he would leave behind. After his death, his former boss, Lee Saunders, said "Paul was an organizer's organizer, a man of great generosity and integrity, a friend and mentor to so many people in Afscme, the labor movement and the progressive community.")

== Career ==
=== Civil rights ===
Booth's opposition to racial discrimination began when she was still in elementary school. She defended an African-American fellow student who was being attacked for allegedly stealing another student's lunch money. It was soon discovered that the girl who made the accusation had put the money in her shoe and forgotten it. In a 1985 interview, Booth said "I remember having the feeling that you don't do this to people." While in high school, she joined the Congress of Racial Equality (CORE) to help protest Woolworth's lunch counter segregation in the South. In 1963, soon after enrolling in college, she became head of a group, called Friends of SNCC, which was organized on campus to support the Student Nonviolent Coordinating Committee. She also became student liaison to the Chicago Council of Community Organizations (CCCO), which was then protesting school segregation in the city. As CCCO liaison, she helped coordinate Freedom Schools in the Chicago's South Side.

In 1964, Booth joined the Freedom Summer project in which volunteers from Northern and Western colleges and universities worked to register Black voters and set up Freedom Schools and Libraries in Mississippi. She was arrested for the first time while she was carrying a sign saying "Freedom Now!" during a peaceful demonstration in Shaw, Mississippi. In an interview conducted in 1989, she said that the experience had reinforced her commitment to the civil rights movement. Confronted by the violent resistance of white Mississippians, she feared for her own life, but also realized that she could leave whenever she wished and was awed by the extraordinary heroism of the Black residents with whom she worked. "They had a quiet heroism," she said, "not just by standing up to bullets, but by day to day being willing to go and talk to their neighbors, have meetings in their churches, take people into their homes." She said the work was full of tiring and frustrating tasks, but recognized that mundane everyday work is what brings meaningful change.

In 1965, Booth was again arrested while demonstrating at banks that were providing financial support for the apartheid regime in South Africa. Shortly afterward, she helped form a number of local groups that sought to learn about urban problems and find ways to overcome them. She left SNCC in 1967 when its leaders no longer welcomed whites as members. She then devoted more of her time to issues related to feminism and the anti-war movement.

=== Feminism ===
In 1965, she began to set up consciousness raising groups that focused on inequality between the sexes. These small groups of women met regularly to speak about incidents, both minor and more serious, that seemed to be unique but often proved to be shared by other women as well. In a pamphlet published in April 1968, Booth and two co-writers noted a tendency for women to "see their problems as personal ones and thus blame themselves." (Note: The pamphlet is Toward a Radical Movement, by Booth, Evie Goldfield, and Sue Munaker. As a corrective to the tendency to self-blame, the authors say "The first step in building a movement is to see that the problems are that men as individuals are not 'the enemy'; rather 'the enemy' is those social institutions and expectations perpetuated by and constraining members of both sexes.") In discovering how many ostensibly unique concerns were actually common ones, members gained a sense of the collective influence they might exert toward changing the unfair practices and dismissive attitudes they had previously accepted as cultural norms.

Booth also helped to organize a course on women's studies, began to coach women who were uneasy about speaking up in class, and conducted a study on the disparity of treatment between male and female students in the classroom. Noticing a similar unequal treatment among student activists, she founded a campus group, the Women's Radical Action Program, to document and counter the ways in which women were relegated to subordinate roles in national organizations such as Students for a Democratic Society and SNCC. (Note: In 1968, Booth and two other authors explained the role of SDS in stimulating feminist action: "In December, 1965, at a national conference of the Students for a Democratic Society, the subject of women's role in society and in the movement was openly discussed. The discontent of the women activists was brought to the surface, therein initiating a radical women's movement.") In 1967, Booth joined with other activists to form the Chicago West Side Group, which was reported to have been "the first women's liberation group in the country, with the primary goal of raising the consciousness of its members."

In 1965, a fellow student asked whether Booth could help his sister who was so greatly distraught about an unwanted pregnancy as to consider killing herself. By contacting the medical arm of the civil rights movement, she was able to refer the woman to a reputable doctor who was willing to perform an abortion. (Note: The group she contacted was the Medical Committee for Human Rights and the doctor was T. R. M. Howard who had been a Mississippi freedom fighter who made one of the earliest and most outspoken denunciations of Emmett Till's murder. Under threat of death he had relocated to Chicago in 1955 where he entered into a public dispute with J. Edgar Hoover over the FBI's failure to vigorously pursue killers of African Americans in the South.) As word quietly spread throughout the university community she was asked to make more referrals to the same doctor. In complying, she made sure that he would not only treat them, but also make sure the patients made a successful recovery. The Jane Collective, or simply Jane, emerged from this early start. Booth formed it by involving like-minded students in a clandestine organization for evaluating doctors, counseling women who contacted them, performing referrals, and conducting follow-up discussions by phone. By 1969 this group, calling itself the Abortion Counseling Service of Women's Liberation, began to advertise in student and underground newspapers, advising pregnant women who needed help to "Call Jane." (Note: Callers would leave a message on an answering machine. Some members of the group would do call-backs and interviews, handing those who wished to proceed to other members who would do face-to-face counseling. Doctors induced miscarriages or performed surgical abortions in safe places (either a member's home or a motel room) and patients were provided with antibiotics and instructions for follow-up care. The name "Jane" was used simply because it sounded nice. The collective took careful notes on its clients and held weekly meetings to discuss issues such as security and secrecy. When, in time, it became difficult to find qualified doctors, members of the collective obtained the necessary training to carry out simple procedures themselves and to refer complex or difficult cases to specialists.) The Jane Collective disbanded following the Roe v. Wade decision of the U.S. Supreme Court on January 22, 1973, which effectively legalized abortion throughout the country.

In 1969, recognizing the need to counter a strong tendency among feminists to see all organizational structures as oppressive, Booth joined with five other women to found the Chicago Women's Liberation Union (CWLU). (Note: The other women were Day Creamer, Susan Davis, Deb Dobbin, Robin Kaufman, and Tobey Klass. In 1972, these women joined with Booth in writing the group's manifesto, Socialist Feminism: A Strategy for the Women's Movement.) They believed that organization was essential for the movement be able to reach out to women who were not already radicalized and for it to develop strategies for winning reforms that would demonstrably improve women's lives. They said a structured approach was needed, including careful planning, the setting of specific goals, and developing strategies achieve these goals. Overall, they were committed to helping women to gain a sense of their collective power. The CWLU organized local chapters, published newspapers, engaged in direct action, and ran a liberation school founded by CWLU's first staff member, Vivian Rothstein. In 1969, Booth became a member of a feminist group called the Women's International Terrorist Conspiracy from Hell (WITCH). (Note: From the Wikipedia article on Witch (citing Eller, Cynthia (1993). Living in the Lap of the Goddess: The Feminist Spirituality Movement in America. Boston: Beacon Press."Spin-off "covens" were founded in Chicago, Illinois, and Washington, D.C.,[1] and W.I.T.C.H. zaps continued until roughly the beginning of 1970. In 1969, a Chicago "coven" gathered in an action outside the Chicago Transit Authority headquarters to "hex" the CTA over a proposed transit hike, dancing and chanting.[20] In another instance, W.I.T.C.H. members protested the firing of a radical feminist professor by entering the sociology department of the University of Chicago and leaving hair and nail clippings all over the building.")

After her marriage and the birth of her sons, Booth began to experience family-related issues that most feminist activists had considered to have little or no importance. Finding no local child care centers in the Hyde Park community where she lived, she joined with two friends in an effort to set one up. (Note: Booth later wrote: " We tried to set up a child care center (we wanted it to be called the Sojourner Truth Child Care Center) and found the city licensing for child care was designed to support two large contractors and not women and their children. We had to make 32 stops to get a city license, if we could get it at all. And centers in church basements (one of the most convenient places) were not allowed because nothing could be 'below land grade' and would need its own generator for kids under 3, as well as other requirements that were not necessary for safety and welfare of the kids.") The bureaucratic obstruction that they encountered led the three to set up a new citywide organization in Chicago called the Action Committee for Decent Childcare (ACDC). Based on the rationale given for setting up the CWLU, to which it was related, ACDC created an organizational structure having specific and achievable goals. A position paper written anonymously in 1972 stated these goals as building a power base of women who work together to accomplish specific reforms in childcare policy, with the expectation that each victory will provide an opportunity to expand the power base and bring further goals within reach. The committee did not set up childcare services but worked to overcome legal barriers to the substantial expansion of these services throughout the city. Within a few years it had forced the liberalization of licensing procedures and won a million dollar city investment in childcare centers.

In 1972, "Socialist Feminism: A Strategy for the Women's Movement", which is believed to be the first publication to use the term "socialist feminism", was published by the Hyde Park Chapter of the CWLU which included Booth, Day Creamer, Susan Davis, Deb Dobbin, Robin Kaufman, and Tobey Klass.

=== Midwest Academy and community organizing ===
After earning her master's degree in 1970, Booth took on part-time editorial work to help support her family. Outraged at her employer's treatment of its clerical staff, she encouraged them to organize. When they confronted him, the boss agreed to meet their demands but insisted on firing Booth. (Note: In a 1989 interview Booth described what happened: "The clerical staff got together and made 10 demands, none of which were monetary. They were all for due process. The boss said he'd grant their demands, but I had to be fired. I agreed. What was I going to say, that everyone else couldn't get what they wanted? A few months later, all the rest of the people who were involved in it were also laid off.") She sued and in 1972 won her case before the National Labor Relations Board. The next year, using money she was awarded in the suit, she founded the Midwest Academy, a training organization that taught grassroots community organizing methods based on earlier work done by Saul Alinsky.

Booth and the other leaders of the academy created a highly regarded tool for the use of the community organizers who came to them for training. Using the tool, academy instructors taught the importance of establishing organizations to set specific goals for using pressure-group tactics in a formally-structured campaign. This tool, the "Midwest Academy Strategy Chart," instructed students in the actions that must be taken following the articulation of a problem and the methods that must be used for determining the success of the resulting campaign. The steps include setting concrete near- and long-term objectives, identifying individuals or groups that are either committed to solving the problem or likely to become supportive allies, and they include measuring the strength and likely tactics of those who will oppose the change. The chart directs attention to targets—the specific individuals who hold decision-making power and are able to affect the campaign—and it asks how these people can be influenced. It focuses on the resources that the campaign can call upon: its budget, its staff, and facilities available to it. And it asks how the campaign can be used to strengthen the coordinating group, what experience its leaders will gain as they conduct it, and whether it offers a good chance to expand into new constituencies and raise additional money.

In May 2023 in Washington, Senator Bernie Sanders keynoted a 50th-anniversary celebration of the Midwest Academy, which included alumni from its training programs.

In 1978, Booth proposed and helped to found an alliance of citizen-activist and labor organizations called the Citizen Labor Energy Coalition, often referred to as CLEC. The group chose her as its executive director at its first meeting and began work toward overcoming the mutual distaste that was seen to exist between the major elements of the New Left and the leadership of the AFL–CIO. In the words of labor historian Andrew Battista, CLEC addressed "a crucial issue of American public life: the relationship between the decline of organized labor and the decay of liberal and progressive politics." CLEC's lasting contribution is seen to be the establishment of new citizen-labor activist groups at the state level.

The experience she gained as president of the Midwest Academy and the many contacts she made with people who attended its training programs enabled her to set up Citizen Action, a nationwide coalition of local activist groups. Set up in 1980, Citizen Action gradually absorbed the statewide groups set up by CLEC and, eventually, CLEC itself. By 1989 the new coalition had a membership of two million people with 24 state affiliates. The issues it took on included plant closings, affordable health care, high energy costs, toxic waste sites, and similar problems, most of them having a degree of bipartisan support. Largely influenced by the negative fallout following the 1980 election of Ronald Reagan, Citizen Action began to move away from the nonpartisan activism of the other organizations that Booth had founded. Departing from her previous practice, she began to take first steps toward entering mainstream politics by helping to defeat Republican candidates for office.

=== Progressive politics ===
In 1981, Booth was arrested while supporting miners during the Pittston Coal strike in Pennsylvania. A news report said she brought about 50 people to support the strike, about 20 of whom were arrested for blocking a courthouse entrance. She was an adviser to Harold Washington's 1983 and 1987 mayoral campaigns in Chicago, and subsequently served as field director for Carol Moseley-Braun's successful campaign for the U.S. Senate in 1992, both of whom were African Americans.

Because the headquarters of Citizen Action was in Washington, D.C., Booth's position as president of the organization caused her to make frequent trips there from her home in Chicago. In Washington she was able to make a growing number of connections with the national leadership of the AFL–CIO and the Democratic Party. In 1993, she became an outreach coordinator for the Democratic National Committee (DNC) for women, labor, and related concerns, and subsequently was named coordinator of the committee's National Health Care Campaign. The DNC made her its training director in 1996.

Four years later, Julian Bond asked Booth to lead the newly-established National Voter Fund of the National Association for the Advancement of Colored People. As a non-profit organization, the fund aimed, in its words, "to engage in issue advocacy, educate voters on candidates' stands on civil rights, and increase voter turnout in the African-American community through voter education and non-partisan registration and get-out-the-vote efforts." Its work helped to produce the unusually large African-American turnout in the presidential election of 2000.

Late in 1999, Booth helped found a federation of progressive community organizing groups called USAction. USAction absorbed some of the member organizations of Citizen Action and, like Citizen Action, it was a progressive advocacy organization intended to stimulate and coordinate community pressure groups.

In 2003, Booth was lead consultant to the Campaign for Comprehensive Immigration Reform and subsequently to the Voter Participation Center. She was also the senior advisor to the One Nation Working Together rally held in October 2010 and consultant to the National Committee to Preserve Social Security and Medicare a year later. Since 2011, she has been a member of an organization of political consultants called Democracy Partners.

They said, 'Elizabeth, if you really want to push for this consumer agency, you've got to get organized.' And I said, 'Great! How?' They said, 'I've got two words for you: Heather Booth.'

— Elizabeth Warren, appearing in the documentary film, Heather Booth: Changing the World.

In 2004, Booth was Get-Out-the-Vote (GOTV) coordinator for the New Mexico Kerry/Edwards presidential campaign. In 2008, she was director of the AFL–CIO Health Care Campaign. In 2009, she directed the campaign to promote congressional passage of President Obama's first budget.

Booth worked to achieve financial reform and establish the Consumer Financial Protection Bureau. In 2010, she was hired to direct Americans for Financial Reform (AFR), a coalition of about 200 consumer, labor, and special interest groups established during the 2008 financial crisis and the Great Recession. AFR played a key role in achieving passage of the Dodd-Frank Act later that year.

As Elizabeth Warren later explained:

AFR managed to scrape together some money, and they used it to hire a handful of employees, including Heather Booth as executive director and Lisa Donner as her deputy. Creating a small team to organize the overall campaign for reform was a brilliant move. Instead of each nonprofit putting a little time into fighting for this or that provision, AFR coordinated the efforts of dozens of groups, magnifying the work of each one by helping them speak with a single voice. Heather and Lisa and the rest of their crew put out press releases, coordinated briefings on Capitol Hill, and organized groups of volunteers. The staffers and lobbyist and lawyers for the megabanks outnumbered them by a zillion to one, but the AFR people were there—day in and day out—hammering on the need for financial reform. They worked their hearts out.

Regarding passage of the Dodd–Frank Act, Booth was jubilant but did not see the achievement as an end in itself. She wrote:

The big lesson is that if we organize, we can win. The progress we made was because people raised our voices, took the message to the public, to the streets, and to the Halls of Congress, where we were joined in our efforts by some committed elected representatives. ... [T]he legislation headed to the President's desk is a better start than almost anyone predicted was possible in the face of the powerful opposition and entrenched power of the status quo. We won. Now let's get back to work.

Calling her "one of the nation's most influential organizers for progressive causes," a profile published in 2017 by journalist David Wood said:

Inside almost every liberal drive over the past five decades—for fair pay, equal justice, abortion rights, workers' rights, voter rights, civil rights, immigration rights, child care—you will find Booth. But you may have to look hard. Because she's not always at the head of the protest march. More often, she's at a let's-get-organized meeting in a suburban church basement or a late-night strategy session in a crumbling neighborhood's community center. She's helping people already roused to action figure out practical ways to move their cause forward. And always she's advancing the credo she learned as a child: that you must not only treat people with dignity and respect, but you must shoulder your own responsibility to help build a society that reflects those values.

In 2018, Booth was arrested at a Capitol Hill protest in support of the DACA program. In 2019, she was arrested again, during a "Fire Drill Fridays" climate change rally, also on Capitol Hill.

During the Biden/Harris presidential campaign of 2020, Booth served as director of senior and progressive engagement and on December 15 of that year was quoted as saying "President-elect Joe Biden's team has always focused on older voters and their concerns will be top-of-mind in his upcoming term."

Booth was appointed Progressive Outreach Director for the 2024 Biden presidential election campaign.

== Political opponents and critics ==
As an activist on the national scene, Booth has drawn considerable criticism from political opponents. In 1978, Republican Congressman Larry McDonald claimed that Booth and the Midwest Academy were associated with the Communist Party USA. A year later, he quoted an article claiming that: "The founder of the Midwest Academy, Heather Tobis Booth, and her husband, Paul Booth, were top leaders of Students for a Democratic Society in the mid-1960s who decided like many other S.D.S. activists that the way to create a socialist system in the United States was to organize a 'hate the rich' campaign under cover of a 'populist' movement for those who have incomes near or below the poverty line." In a book published in 2010, conservative author Stanley Kurtz called Booth "arguably the queen of socialist politics in Chicago," and said she was determined "to drag modern American socialism, kicking and screaming, into the heart of America's mainstream institutions."

In 2013, Paul Sperry said she was a leading figure among the "socialist activists and their front groups [who] played a shockingly outsized role shaping and passing the monumental financial reform legislation that authorized the creation of President Obama's powerful consumer credit watchdog agency." Sperry is a conservative journalist and author of anti-Muslim books, who has served as bureau chief in Washington, D.C. for the conspiratorial website WorldNetDaily and written opinion pieces for the New York Post.

== Honors and awards ==
- On May 9, 1987, Booth received the Thomas-Debs Award at a dinner in her honor held by the Democratic Socialists of America. (Note: The evening's other awardee was Jacquelyne D. Grimshaw, Deputy Campaign Manager of the Committee to Re-Elect Mayor Washington.)
- On June 16, 2009, the Washington, D.C., office of AVODAH held a "Partner in Justice Event" honoring Booth.
- On July 6, 2013, during the national conference of the National Organization for Women, Booth accepted the Victoria J. Mastrobuono Women's Health Award on behalf of the Jane Collective.
- On September 23, 2015, the Chicago Abortion Fund honored Booth and the Jane Collective at its 25th anniversary celebration.
- On October 19, 2016, United Vision for Idaho gave a reception honoring Booth in conjunction with a showing of Heather Booth: Changing the World. This was one of quite a few receptions of similar nature that were held in conjunction with the showing of the documentary film.
- On October 21, 2020, Jane Fonda presented Booth with Personal PAC's Irving Harris Award at a virtual luncheon that was also attended by Hillary Clinton. Personal PAC is an Illinois-based political action committee that is dedicated to electing pro-choice candidates to state and local office.
- In March 2022, Booth received the Raphael Lemkin Human Rights Award from T'ruah, the Rabbinic Call for Human Rights. The T'ruah announcement says, in part, "Heather Booth has committed her life to bringing a Jewish lens to work for social justice."

== Documentary films, television appearances, and podcasts ==
- In 1989, as coordinator of Mobilization for Women's Lives, Booth appeared in television coverage of the 20th Anniversary Celebration & Conference of the National Abortion and Reproductive Rights Action League.
- In June 1990, as president of Citizen Action, she participated in a televised panel discussion concerning post Cold War strategies hosted by the Institute for Policy Studies. The topic was "Informing our Activism After the Cold War."
- In October 1990, as director of the Coalition for Democratic Values, she led a televised panel discussion hosted by the coalition on its formation and its goal of pressing the Democratic Party to retain progressive values.
- She was interviewed in the 1994 film Freedom on My Mind, directed by Connie Field and Marilyn Mulford, written by Michael Chandler.
- She was interviewed in the 1995 film Jane: An Abortion Service, directed by Kate Kirtz and Nell Lundy (Chicago, Juicy Productions, 1995).
- In April 1996, as training director of the Democratic National Committee, she gave a televised address to the National Association of Social Workers on "Women and the 1996 Elections."
- In November 2000, as Executive Director of the NAACP National Voter Fund, she participated in a televised discussion held by the fund concerning "African-American Voter Turnout" in that year's elections.
- In 2007, as director of the AFL–CIO health care campaign, she participated in a televised discussion on "Health Care Reform" hosted by the AFL–CIO.
- She appeared in the 2008 film The Coat Hanger Project, written, directed and filmed by Angie Young and featuring Loretta Ross, Heather Booth, Mildred Hanson, Vicki Saporta, and Jeannie Ludlow ([Washington, D.C.], Coat Hanger Project, 2008).
- She appeared in the 2013 film Feminist: Stories from Women's Liberation, directed, edited, and narrated by Jennifer Lee, and featuring Robin Morgan, Betty Friedan, Gloria Steinem, Eleanor Holmes Norton, Aileen Hernandez, Ruth Rosen, Vivian Rothstein, Kathie Sarachild, Heather Booth, Frances M. Beal, Himilce Novas, Eleanor Smeal, Sheila Tobias, Sonia Pressman Fuentes, Ti-Grace Atkinson, Jacqui Ceballos, Mary King, Richard Graham, Karen DeCrow, Eve Norman, Ivy Bottini, Chude Allen, Alix Kates Shulman, Byllye Avery, and Betita Martinez (New York, Women Make Movies, 2013).
- She was featured in the 2014 feminist history film She's Beautiful When She's Angry, a film by Mary Dore, Nancy C Kennedy, and Mark Degli Antoni of the International Film Circuit (New York, She's Beautiful Film Project, Cinema Guild, 2014).
- She appeared in the film This Little Light of Mine: The Legacy of Fannie Lou Hamer, by Robin N. Hamilton with Leslie Burl McLemore, Dorie Ladner, Heather Booth, and Rev. Ed King (New York, Filmmakers Library, Imprint of Alexander Street Press, [2015]).
- She was the subject of the documentary Heather Booth: Changing the World, directed, written, and produced by Lilly Rivlin (New York, Just Luck Productions, Women Make Movies (Firm), [2016]).
- On February 6, 2017, she was interviewed on the Ben Joravsky Show on radio station WCPT in Chicago, available as a podcast from SoundCloud.
- She is interviewed for the inaugural episode of This Way Forward, a podcast by Wylie Chang, a student at Bowdoin College, (Bowdoin Commons, Bowdoin, Maine).
- She is the subject of a podcast by Anna Greenberg, "Heather Booth" (That's What She Said, May 13, 2017).
- In a review of the film Call Jane, Variety author, Peter Debruge says that the character "Virginia" (played by Sigourney Weaver) is "loosely based" on Booth's life.
- A recollection Booth made in this documentary was quoted in the Washington Post in January 2022. Booth said, "A friend of mine was raped at knifepoint, in her bed in off-campus housing. I went with her to student health. She was given a lecture on promiscuity."
- Booth appeared in a video program on this documentary produced by Democracy Now! on January 24, 2022. The program summary quoted her as saying, "You have to stand up to illegitimate authority."
- In January 2022, Booth was interviewed by Jennifer 8. Lee on the Chicago educational radio station, WBEZ in a program whose transcript has been published by the station.

== Writings ==
The following are Booth's contributions to books, pamphlets, and blog posts as sole author, joint author, or contributor.

- Heather Booth, Evie Goldfield, and Sue Munaker, Toward a Radical Movement (Boston, New England Free Press, April 1968).
- Harry C. Boyte, Heather Booth, and Steve Max, Citizen Action and the New American Populism (Philadelphia, Temple University Press, 1986).
- Heather Booth (ed.) Midwest Academy Records : Heather Booth's Personal Files, 1964 and 1984, (e-book) (Bethesda, Md. : University Publications of America, 2014). (Note: Summary: "The papers were assembled by Heather Tobis Booth, co-founder of the Midwest Academy in Chicago, Illinois and concern in large measure the Mississippi Freedom Summer project of 1964. Documents date to 1964, with a few documents from 1963 and one newspaper retrospective supplement on the Freedom Summer from 1984. Document types include personal and professional correspondence; membership literature and statistics; Freedom Summer brochures and background information on race relations and politics in Mississippi; speech transcripts; newspaper clippings; and internal and external reports as part of administrative and organizational records." — Provided by publisher.)
- Heather Booth, Obama Is Right to Fight for Real Financial Reform: Let's Organize to Hold Big Banks Accountable, HuffPost (weblog), March 30, 2010.
- Heather Booth, Is the Senate Afraid of Ghosts?, HuffPost (weblog), April 7, 2010.
- Heather Booth, Beware Frank Luntz's Lies and Rein in the Big Banks!, HuffPost (weblog), April 10, 2010.
- Heather Booth, Bipartisanship Is Not a Substitute for Real Reform, HuffPost (weblog), May 3, 2010.
- Heather Booth, The Two Rules of Real Financial Reform, HuffPost (weblog), May 12, 2010.
- Heather Booth, Bankers Swarm Capitol Hill Because They Love You, HuffPost (weblog), May 19, 2010.
- Heather Booth, It All Comes Down to This, HuffPost (weblog), June 23, 2010.
- Heather Booth, When the public is watching, the Senate is forced to side with Main Street over Wall Street, HuffPost (weblog), June 29, 2010.
- Heather Booth, Big Victory in the House, but Big Fight Remains, HuffPost (weblog), June 30, 2010.
- Heather Booth, V-I-C-T-O-R-Y !!!, HuffPost (weblog), July 15, 2010.
- Heather Booth, Fasting for Families: When We Act, We Can Change the World, HuffPost (weblog), December 2, 2013.
- Heather Booth, To My Progressive Friends – About Tim Kaine, HuffPost (weblog), July 25, 2016.

== Organizations ==
This is an incomplete chronological list of organizations that Booth has founded, directed, consulted for, and/or participated in.

- Early in her high school years, she participated in anti-death penalty action via the American Friends Service Committee.
- In 1960, she joined CORE and participated in picketing Woolworth's because of that retail chain's discrimination against African Americans in the Southern states.
- In 1963 or 1964, she joined with Chicago Council of Community Organization members who were attacking the segregationist policies of school superintendent Ben Willis. He refused to address overcrowding in black schools and rather than integrate students, he sent black children to mobile classrooms on the playground.
- Between 1963 and 1965, she became head of the campus Friends of SNCC organization, worked in mental institutions, tutored students in Woodlawn, and helped coordinate South Side freedom schools.
- In 1964, she helped register voters and taught in freedom schools during Freedom Summer in Mississippi.
- In 1965, she was arrested for the first time. She later said: "My first arrest was at an anti-apartheid effort, in 1965. There was a consortium of 10 U.S. banks that bailed out the South African apartheid regime that would collapse otherwise, so there were demonstrations at those banks."
- In 1965, she formed Women's Radical Action Program.
- In 1965 or 1966, she founded the Jane Collective, a clandestine abortion counseling and abortion service that performed 11,000 abortions prior to the Roe v. Wade court decision in 1973.
- In 1967, she helped to found the Chicago Women's Liberation Union.
- In 1967, she left SDS, during a disagreement over tactics. She later said she was committed to "old new left" and believed in better strategic planning than the "new new left" was advocating.
- In 1968, she left SNCC when new leadership made it clear that whites were no longer welcome.
- In 1970, she participated in the Women's Strike for Equality and joined NOW.
- In 1970–72, she won a suit for unfair labor practice from a business that had hired her as an editorial consultant.
- In 1973, she used the monetary award from that suit to set up Midwest Academy.
- In 1980, she founded and became executive director of the Citizen-Labor Energy Coalition.
- In 1980, she organized Citizen Action.
- In 1983, she was named the deputy field director for the Harold Washington mayoral campaign.
- In 1984, she helped found Jewish Fund for Justice.
- In 1987, she received the Eugene Debs Award from the Chicago branch of Democratic Socialists of America.
- In 1987, she worked on the re-election campaign of Harold Washington.
- In 1989, having moved from Chicago to Washington, D.C., she served as president and head of the national office of Citizen Action.
- In 1992, she headed the field operation for Carol Moseley Braun's Senatorial campaign.
- In 1993, she became outreach coordinator for the Democratic National Committee and coordinator of DNC National Health Care Campaign.
- In 1994, she joined the advisory council of the Women's Information Network.
- In 1996, she was named training director of the Democratic National Committee.
- In 1999, she helped found and has variously served as vice chair, board member, executive committee member, and senior advisor to USAction.
- In 2000, she became director of the NAACP National Voter Fund.
- In 2003, she was the lead consultant in the founding of the Campaign for Comprehensive Immigration Reform.
- In 2003 or later, she was consultant to the Voter Participation Center.
- In 2004, she was get-out-the-vote coordinator for the New Mexico Kerry/Edwards campaign.
- In 2005, she joined the board of the Center for Community Change.
- In 2007–2008, she directed the AFL-CIO campaign for universal health care.
- In 2009, she directed the field campaign for passage of President Obama's first budget.
- In 2010, she was founding director of Americans for Financial Reform.
- In 2010, she was senior advisor to the One Nation Working Together rally.
- In 2011, she became a consultant to the National Committee to Preserve Social Security and Medicare.
- In 2011, she joined the Democracy Partners consultancy.
- In 2011, and following years, she has been an advisor to the Alliance for Citizenship. She has also served as consultant with NOW, MoveOn.org, the National Committee to Preserve Social Security and Medicare, the National Council of La Raza, People's Action, the Center for Community Change, and other progressive nonprofit groups.
