= One Nation Working Together rally =

Reform activism in the United States

One Nation Working Together
- Date: October 2, 2010
- Location: The National Mall Washington, D.C.
- Participants: Sponsored by over 400 progressive organizations such as unions and political advocacy groups

The One Nation Working Together rally was held on October 2, 2010 in Washington, D.C. by a coalition of liberal and progressive organizations operating under the umbrella of "One Nation Working Together". It was held on the steps of the Lincoln Memorial to demand better jobs, immigration and education reform and as an "antidote" to the Tea Party movement.

== Rally ==
With crowds assembling as early as 6:00 AM EST, the rally began with an interfaith service at 11:00 AM, followed by the beginning of musical performances by various recording artists and groups at noon. The event progressed with a series of speeches by various figures before concluding at 4:30 PM.

One of the masters of ceremonies for the event was television personality Ed Schultz. The coordinator for the event was Leah D. Daughtry.

The rally attracted criticism from the right because the Communist Party USA and International Socialist Organization were among the 400 sponsors who endorsed the rally.

=== Speakers ===
- Harry Belafonte
- Mary Kay Henry
- Jesse Jackson
- Benjamin Jealous
- Van Jones
- Bob King
- Joe Madison
- Marc Morial
- Al Sharpton
- Richard Trumka

=== Performers ===
- Black Ice
- George Clinton
- Charlie Hill (comedian)

=== Attendance ===
There is no official police or Parks Department estimate of Washington DC mass events. Most media outlets, including The Washington Post, The Huffington Post, and The New York Times estimated the crowd was in the tens of thousands. Organizers said the crowd was between 175,000 and 200,000. Organizers claimed the rally had more attendees than the Restoring Honor rally, but various media outlets rejected this claim. The Associated Press said "Saturday‘s crowds were less dense and didn’t reach as far to the edges as they did during Beck’s rally." The New York Times said "significant areas of the National Mall that had been filled during Mr. Beck’s rally were empty." ABC News, Politico, and NPR agreed.

Conservative Michelle Malkin posted a report on her blog showing that the "One Nation" website – as of two days after the rally – was showing a photograph of the crowd that was actually taken at Martin Luther King Jr.'s 1963 March on Washington for Jobs and Freedom. The image included text thanking the participants who attended and asking for them to share their stories from October 2010. One Nation updated its website by the next day, posting an image from October 2, 2010.

== Reactions ==
"This is true democracy and good old-fashioned organizing at work," said Leah Daughtry, national campaign director of One Nation Working Together, adding that the turnout exceeded her expectations, marking "an important moment in the progressive movement." Ben Jealous of the NAACP said that "we're not an alternative to the Tea Party. We want to be an antidote... We want to make the mainstream of the country visible to itself."

Communist Party USA sponsored and participated in the rally, and Sam Webb, CPUSA national chair, said, "There's never been anything quite like this march. The great thing is that it happened, who was there, who spoke, the spirit and politics."

Before the event took place, it received derision from right-wing oppositional circles, with Glenn Beck criticizing the participation of Marxist and Communist groups. He also criticized it as "truly, truly Astroturf" and said labor unions paid travel expenses for many while Restoring Honor attendees paid for themselves.

From the other side, many on the left offered advance criticism for it being organized as a "pep rally" for the Democrats, and limiting criticism of the War in Afghanistan and the Obama administration.

The United Methodist Church's General Board on Church and Society withdrew its endorsement the day before the rally, saying what "began with a clean, clear message consistent with the social teachings of The United Methodist Church" devolved into nothing more than a gathering organized in opposition to the Restoring Honor rally. It also denounced the "un-Christ-like tone" of discourse in the country, including within the church itself. It was the only major endorser to withdraw.

== See also ==
- List of protest marches on Washington, D.C.
