= Americans for Financial Reform =

Nonprofit organization

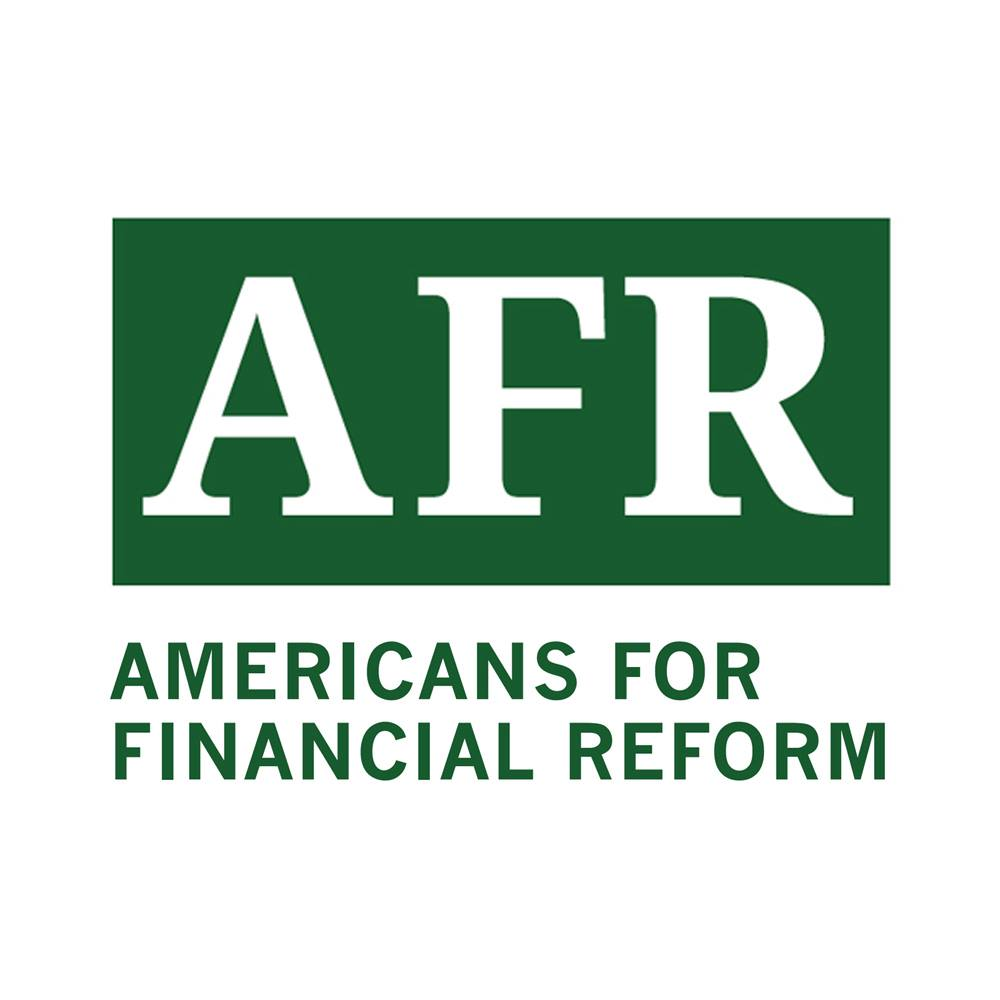
- Formation: 2009
- Type: Nonprofit advocacy group
- Purpose: Stricter regulation of U.S. financial system
- Location: Washington, D.C.
- Co-Executive Director: Lisa Donner
- Co-Executive Director: Ericka Taylor
- Website: ourfinancialsecurity.org

Americans for Financial Reform (AFR) is a progressive nonprofit organization which advocates for financial reform in the United States, including stricter regulation of Wall Street. AFR is a coalition of approximately 200 consumer, labor and special interest groups.

== Activities ==
The group supported the passage of the Dodd–Frank Wall Street Reform and Consumer Protection Act as well as the creation of the Consumer Financial Protection Bureau. AFR has received funding from the Democracy Alliance.

AFR launched the Take on Wall Street coalition in 2016 that Elizabeth Warren helped popularize. Like Occupy Wall Street, the coalition aims to turn populist anger into financial reforms like public or postal banking.

During the Biden administration, AFR pushed for the appointment of progressives to federal office. The group praised the nomination of Saule Omarova to lead the Office of the Comptroller of the Currency (OCC).
