= Coalition for Comprehensive Immigration Reform =

U.S. nonprofit organization

NAOC Logo

The Coalition for Comprehensive Immigration Reform (CCIR), also known as CCIR/NAOC or New American Opportunity Campaign (NAOC), is a non-profit immigrant rights advocacy organization based in Washington, DC, established in 2003 to pass comprehensive immigration reform. It was instrumental in the 2004 Immigrant Workers Freedom Ride, modeled after the Freedom Rides of the Civil Rights Movement, and acts as an umbrella organization for several national and local immigrant rights organizations for advocacy and coalition building.

The New American Opportunity Campaign was launched by CCIR in 2004. Soon, the campaign became the core project of the coalition, and NAOC became a better-known name than CCIR. CCIR consolidated its identity into the single "Coalition for Comprehensive Immigration Reform" name in 2007.

== Board of directors ==
- Deepak Bhargava, Center for Community Change
- Cecilia Muñoz, National Council of La Raza
- Frank Sharry, America's Voice
- Chung-Wha Hong, New York Immigration Coalition
- Eliseo Medina, Service Employees International Union (SEIU)
- Tom Snyder, UNITE HERE
