= David Smith (journalist) =

British journalist

- Born: David Richard Smith
- Education: University of Leeds
- Occupation: Journalist
- Employer: The Guardian
- Writing career
- Genre: Non-fiction

David Richard Smith is the Washington, D.C., bureau chief for The Guardian. From 2010 to 2015, Smith was the Africa correspondent for The Guardian, for which he was based in Johannesburg, South Africa.

== Personal life ==
Smith is a graduate of the University of Leeds. Smith married American actress Andrea Harris, a grand-daughter of historically influential African-American psychologists and educators Kenneth and Mamie Clark, at the Loeb Boathouse in Central Park, Manhattan, New York City, on 18 September 2010.
