= Paul Booth (labor organizer) =

Activist and labor organizer(1943 - 2018)

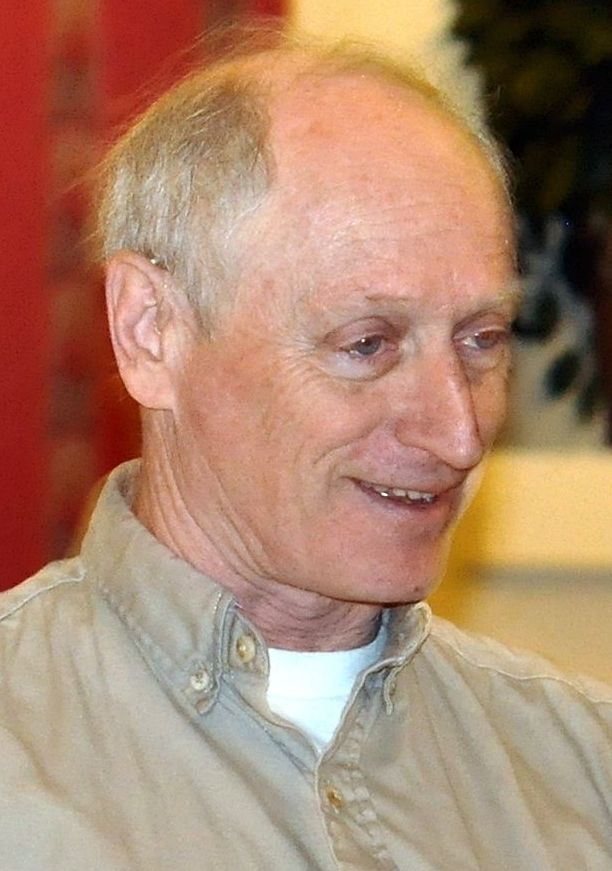
Paul Booth in 2016

Paul Booth (June 7, 1943 – January 17, 2018) was an American activist, anti-war protester, and lifelong labor organizer.

Called "one of the labor movement's key strategists" by Harold Meyerson and "an organizer's organizer" by American Federation of State County and Municipal Employees (AFSCME) President Lee Saunders, he began his work in labor movement in 1966 as research director for the United Packinghouse Workers of America. He became an organizing director for AFSCME where he worked for four decades. Prior to that, he was a student organizer in the class of 1964, forming a chapter of the Students for a Democratic Society (SDS) at Swarthmore and was one of the drafters of the SDS Port Huron Statement. He became the SDS national secretary for a year, moving to Chicago in 1965. He was one of the chief organizers of the April 1965 March on Washington to End the War in Vietnam as part of SDS's Peace Research and Education Project which he co-led with Todd Gitlin. In 1971, Booth co-chaired the Citizens Action Program (CAP), a group which first investigated air pollution but soon switched to exposing fraudulent underassessment of property values for tax evasion purposes. CAP's investigations found that U.S. Steel had evaded billions of dollars in taxes through low assessment of its properties. Booth's organizational skills and the activities of CAP inspired other groups to launch further investigations into taxation—especially property taxation—throughout Illinois.

He spoke at the first day of the Democratic National Convention in Philadelphia in 2016 after Hillary Clinton appointed him to serve on the Democratic Party's platform drafting committee. He retired from his position of executive assistant to AFSCME's President Saunders in 2017 and continued to write about political strategy for the 2018 election. On his retirement early in 2017, Representative Jan Schakowsky inserted into the Congressional Record an appreciation of Paul Booth's "contributions to the progressive movement as an activist, organizer, mentor and leader," praising the "rich legacy and a lasting record of achievement" that he would leave behind.

== Personal life ==
Booth grew up in Washington, D.C. His parents were both Socialist Party members: his mother was a psychiatric social worker and his father was an economist with the Department of Labor who helped craft Social Security during the Roosevelt administration. He graduated from Swarthmore College in 1964. He was married to Heather Booth (née Tobis) in July 1967 and was interviewed in a documentary about her life. They had two children, Gene and Dan.

He died January 17, 2018, from complications of chronic lymphocytic leukemia.

== Writings ==
Paul Booth (c. 1965) A Strategy for University Reform. Students for a Democratic Society. New York. Retrieved January 27, 2018.
