= Wall Street reform =

Wall Street reforms are reforms or regulations of the financial industry in the United States.

Wall Street is the home of the country's two largest stock exchanges, and "Wall Street" is a metonym for the United States financial sector. Major historical Wall Street reform bills include the Federal Reserve Act of 1913, the Glass-Steagall Act of 1933, the Truth in Lending Act of 1968, the Community Reinvestment Act of 1977, the Gramm–Leach–Bliley Act of 1999, and the Sarbanes-Oxley Act of 2002. On July 22, 2010, the most recent Wall Street reform bill, the Dodd–Frank Wall Street Reform and Consumer Protection Act, was signed by President of the United States Barack Obama, after the 2008 financial crisis.

== The Glass–Steagall Act of 1933 ==
The Glass–Steagall Act of 1933 placed a "wall of separation" between banks and brokerages, which was largely repealed by the Financial Services Modernization Act of 1999. The bill was enacted during the Great Depression, which began with the Wall Street crash of 1929. The Gramm–Leach–Bliley Act of 1999 repealed the "wall of separation," allowing companies to simultaneously act as commercial banks, investment banks, and insurance companies. House Democratic leaders refused to allow an amendment by Rep. Maurice Hinchey (D-NY) to restore Glass-Steagall as part of the 2009 Frank bill. Hinchey introduced his proposal as a separate bill, the Glass-Steagall Restoration Act of 2009. Nonetheless, the "Volcker rule" proposed by the Obama administration has been described as a "new Glass-Steagall Act for the 21st century", as it establishes stringent rules against banks using their own money to make risky investments.

== Sarbanes–Oxley Act of 2002 ==
The Sarbanes–Oxley Act, by Sen. Paul S. Sarbanes (D-MD) and Rep. Michael G. Oxley (R-OH), was signed into law by George W. Bush in July 2002. The bill was enacted as a reaction to a number of major corporate and accounting scandals including those affecting Enron and WorldCom.

== Dodd–Frank (2010) ==
As of May 2010, both the House and Senate bills had been passed, but the differences between the bills were to be worked out in United States congressional conference committee. Differences which to be resolved included: whether the new consumer protection agency would be independent (Senate) or part of the Federal Reserve; whether to require banks to issue credit derivatives in separately capitalized affiliates (Senate); how exactly the Federal Deposit Insurance Corporation (FDIC) will wind down or bail out large institutions which fail; the circumstances under which large institutions could be broken up; a 15 to 1 leverage limit in the House bill; the terms of a Fed audit (continuous as in the House bill or one-time as in the Senate bill); both bills include the Volcker rule which prohibits proprietary trading by bank holding companies, but both have a caveat which allow for regulators to overrule the rule; both bills propose to regulate credit rating agencies, but the Senate's bill is much stronger.

=== House bill ===
H.R. 4173, the Wall Street Reform and Consumer Protection Act of 2009 by Rep. Barney Frank (D-MA), passed by the House of Representatives in December 2009, and awaiting action by the Senate as of April 2010.

=== Senate bill ===
S.3217 was introduced by Senate Banking Committee chairman Chris Dodd (D-CT) on April 15, 2010. Dodd's bill included a $50 billion liquidation fund which drew criticism as a continuing bailout, which he was pressured to remove by Republicans and the Obama administration. The Senate bill passed on May 20, 2010.

=== Volcker Rule ===
The Volcker Rule was proposed by President Barack Obama in 2010 based on advice by Paul Volcker, and a draft of the proposed legislation was prepared by the U.S. Treasury Department. It limited any one bank from holding more than 10% of FDIC-insured deposits, and prohibited any bank with a division holding such deposits from using its own capital to make speculative investments. The Volcker rule faced heavy resistance in the Senate and was introduced as part of the subsequent Dodd bill only in a limited form.

=== Financial Stability Oversight Council ===
Chaired by the United States Secretary of the Treasury, a new multi-authority oversight body called the Financial Stability Oversight Council of regulators will be established. The council will consist of nine members including regulators from the Federal Reserve System, U.S. Securities and Exchange Commission, Federal Housing Finance Agency, and many other agencies. The main purpose of the council is to identify risk in the Financial system. Also, the council will look at the interconnectivity of the highly leveraged financial firms and can ask companies to divest holdings if their structure poses a great threat to the Financial system. The council will have a solid control on the operations of the leveraged firms and also help in increasing the transparency.

== See also ==
- Monetary reform
