= Leah D. Daughtry =

American minister and political activist

Personal details
- Born: New York City, New York, U.S.
- Party: Democratic
- Education: Dartmouth College (BA); Wesley Theological Seminary (MTS)

Leah D. Daughtry is an American political activist and Christian minister.

She was the CEO of the 2016 and 2008 Democratic National Convention committees, and the chief of staff to Howard Dean, the former chairman of the Democratic National Committee.

== Early life ==
Born and raised in Brooklyn, New York, Leah Daughtry is a graduate of Dartmouth College and Wesley Theological Seminary.

== Career ==
Daughtry is a nationally known organizer, activist, political strategist, author, faith leader, and public theologian. The daughter of a long line of community organizers and activists, she represents the fifth consecutive generation of pastors in the Daughtry family.

She is principal of On These Things, LLC.

Currently, Daughtry serves as presiding prelate of the House of the Lord Churches. She has also served as a resident fellow at Harvard University's Institute of Politics, where she focused on the role faith and values play in American politics.

She was formerly Acting Assistant Secretary for Administration and Management at the United States Department of Labor. She directs the Democratic Party's Faith in Action initiative to reach out to Protestant, Catholic, Jewish, and Muslim voters. In the 2008 DNC convention, Daughtry as convention CEO, denied non-religious groups participation in the interfaith service.

In 2018, Daughtry launched Power Rising, an organization designed to support Black women in leveraging political, economic, and social power to ensure equity, opportunity, and representation.

In a 2019 article for The New York Times, she was critical of the Bernie Sanders 2020 presidential campaign.

In 2023, President Biden appointed Daughtry to serve as vice chair of the board of directors of the Wilson International Center for Scholars. She also serves as an equity advisor for Sephora, and on the editorial board of the Global Women’s Forum for the Economy and Society. She sits on the board of directors of Wesley Theological Seminary, the National Council of Negro Women, Higher Heights for America, and the Katie Geneva Cannon Center for Womanist Leadership. in addition, she is co-founder and co-chair of Black Church PAC, and co-chair of the Samuel DeWitt Proctor conference. She is a member of Alpha Kappa Alpha. An at-large member of the Democratic National Committee, the governing body of the Democratic Party, she serves as a member of its rules and bylaws committee.

== Select bibliography ==
- Brazile, Donna; Daughtry, Leah; Moore, Minyon; Chambers, Veronica; Caraway, Yolanda (2019). For Colored Girls Who Have Considered Politics. New York: Picador. ISBN 9781250137739. OCLC 1076512988.
- Darro Ringer, Christophe (2023). Moved by the spirit: religion and the movement for Black lives. Maryland: Lexington Books. ISBN 9781793647788. OCLC 1370249202.
