= Jane Collective =

1969–1973 American underground abortion organization

The Jane Collective or Jane, officially known as the Abortion Counseling Service of Women's Liberation, was an underground service in Chicago, Illinois affiliated with the Chicago Women's Liberation Union that operated from 1969 to 1973, a time when abortion was illegal in most of the United States. The foundation of the organization was laid when Heather Booth helped her friend's sister obtain a safe abortion in 1965. Other women with unwanted pregnancies began to contact Booth after learning via word-of-mouth that she could help them. When the workload became more than what she could manage, she reached out to other activists in the women's liberation movement. The collective sought to address the increasing number of unsafe abortions being performed by untrained providers. Since illegal abortions were not only dangerous but very expensive, the founding members of the collective believed that they could provide women with safer and more affordable access to abortions.

Initially, the organization directed the women to male doctors. After a few years, however, they learned that one of their most-used doctors had lied about having medical credentials. This created a conflict in the group, causing some members to leave. Others realized that if a man without medical credentials could perform a safe abortion, then they could learn as well. A few of their number learned how to perform surgical abortions, with the dilation and curettage method most commonly used. Members of the group performed an estimated 11,000 abortions, mostly to low-income women who could not afford to travel to the places where abortion was legal, as well as women of color.

In 1972, one of the Jane Collective apartments was raided by the police, and seven of its members were arrested. Each was charged with eleven counts of abortion and conspiracy to commit abortion, carrying a maximum prison sentence of 110 years. Their attorney was able to delay court proceedings in anticipation of the Supreme Court's decision on Roe v. Wade. As the attorney hoped, the Court's decision in Roe in 1973 struck down many abortion restrictions in the US, and the charges against the Jane Collective members were dropped. As women now had access to legal abortion, the Collective disbanded shortly afterwards. While their abortions sometimes resulted in complications, none of their clients were known to die from their abortions.

== Historical context ==
By the mid-1900s, abortion was illegal in almost every US state. In the state of Illinois, at the time the Jane Collective formed, abortion was considered felony homicide. However, in the 1960s, it was estimated that a third of US women who wanted no more children would have at least one unintended pregnancy by the end of their childbearing years. In the 1950s and 1960s, it was estimated that 200,000–1.2 million illegal abortions occurred annually. Women sometimes died as a result of these procedures, accounting for 17% of all deaths attributed to childbirth and pregnancy in 1965. Low-income women had relatively high rates of obtaining illegal abortions, at 8% of those surveyed in New York City, with the majority attempting a self-induced abortion and only 2% involving physicians. In New York City, non-white and Puerto Rican women were more at risk from illegal abortions: abortion accounted for half of all their pregnancy-related deaths, in contrast to 25% of pregnancy-related deaths for white women. Nationwide, the abortion-related mortality rate for non-white women was twelve times greater than that of white women from 1972–1974.

Abortion remained illegal in each state until Colorado was the first to decriminalize abortion in some circumstances in 1967. In 1970, four states—Washington, New York, Hawaii, and Alaska—repealed laws against abortion, making it generally legal before the age of viability. Traveling to obtain legal abortion became easier for the affluent, as they no longer had to travel to destinations such as the United Kingdom. Traveling to obtain an abortion was cost prohibitive for those who could not afford the procedure, let alone travel and lodging expenses.

For those who could procure an illegal abortion, results were mixed. Some women experienced hemorrhaging or sepsis. Others paid for abortions only to still be pregnant afterwards from a botched procedure.

== Origins ==
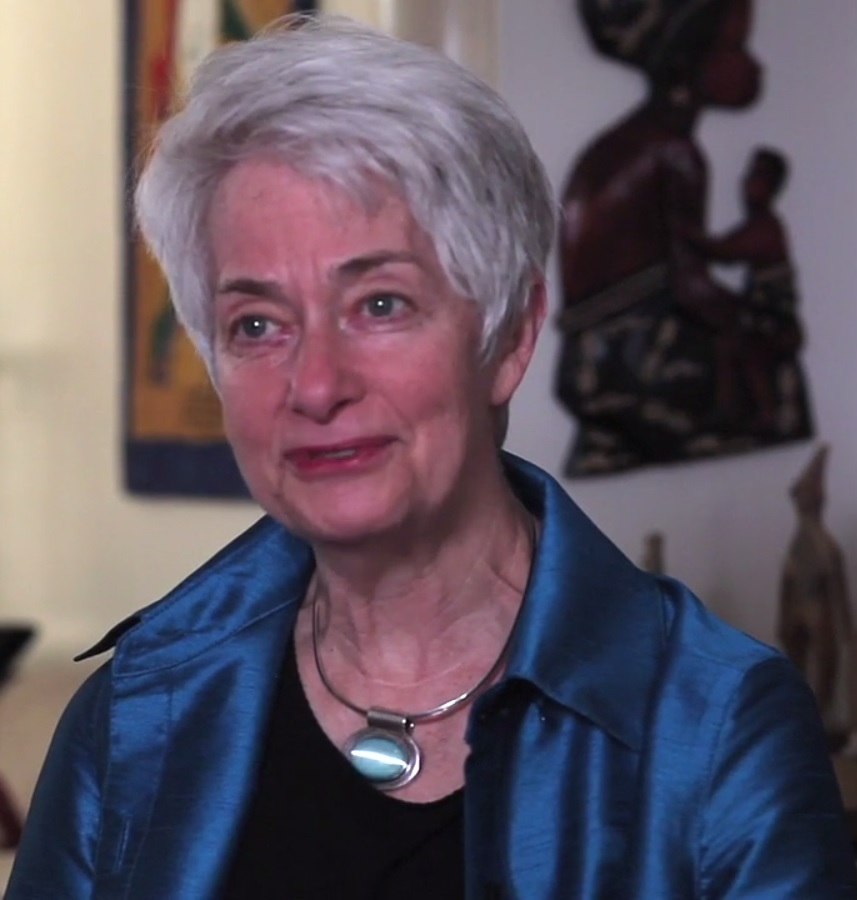
Heather Booth, the founder of the Jane Collective

In 1965, University of Chicago student Heather Booth learned that her friend's sister had an unwanted pregnancy that left her distraught and nearly suicidal. Booth had previously not given much thought to abortion access; her exposure to the experience of an unwanted pregnancy led her to consider abortion restrictions as unjust laws, saying, "in the face of an unjust law, you need to take action to challenge it". To seek assistance for her friend's sister, Booth contacted the Medical Committee for Human Rights, who connected her with civil rights leader and surgeon T. R. M. Howard. Howard worked at the Friendship Medical Center in Chicago, and Booth sent her friend to his facility. Word spread that Booth was able to help women obtain safe abortions, and she soon began receiving calls from other women. Operating under the pseudonym "Jane", Booth began taking such phone calls at her college dormitory, referring more clients to Howard, who performed the abortions for $500. Booth later switched to an abortion care provider alternately referred to as "Mike" or "Nick".

Location of Hyde Park, Chicago, where the Jane Collective was founded

Booth continued to refer patients for abortions, averaging one per week, mostly for low-income women and women of color. This continued until 1968 when she was out of college, married, pregnant, and employed full-time. With less time to devote to connecting women with abortion providers, she recruited and trained ten other women to help her. She transferred her leadership role to Ruth Surgal and Jody Parsons. The organization, founded in Hyde Park, Chicago, adopted the name Abortion Counseling Service of Women's Liberation, proclaiming that they were for "every woman having exactly as many children as she wants, when she wants, if she wants." They decided that the name was wordy, though; women who called should ask for "Jane", which they considered the "everywoman name". The Abortion Counseling Service of Women's Liberation was a work group of the Chicago Women's Liberation Union. One member of the Jane Collective was known as "Jenny". She was motivated to help provide abortion access by her past struggles to obtain a safe abortion. Jenny discovered that she was pregnant shortly after she was diagnosed with Hodgkin's lymphoma. She sought an abortion due to concerns about the effects of her radiation treatment on the fetus, but was denied by the hospital board. After informing two psychiatrists that she intended to kill herself if not allowed an abortion, she was allowed her request.

== Organization structure and services ==
The services of the Jane Collective spread through word of mouth. The organization also reached women through posting signs in the city that read, "Pregnant? Don't want to be? Call Jane", listing the phone number. They placed ads in underground newspapers saying, "Pregnant? Worried? Call Jane." The number directed the caller to an answering machine, where they were instructed to leave their name, phone number, and date of their last period. The woman would then be contacted by a member of the Collective, who would schedule a meeting to discuss the procedure. The Jane Collective had patients referred to them by medical professionals, which annoyed them, as the doctors were almost always unwilling to provide any assistance. If the woman decided to proceed with the abortion, she was given the address of "The Front". "The Front" was one of the many apartments that the Collective rented throughout the city. Before the abortion, the patient and a member of Jane would meet at The Front, where the patient would then be driven to a second location to undergo the abortion.

"Jenny", one of the members, eventually began demanding to be in the room with the patients while the procedure was performed to ensure that the women were treated well. Jenny was highly critical of how her health was managed by men when she was pregnant with cancer, saying "Through that whole experience, there wasn't one woman involved. It was men — the doctors, the hospital board — controlling my reproductive rights and condemning me to death." Jenny learned about providing abortions by watching "Nick", who eventually trained her as his nurse.

Abortions remained cost-prohibitive for their clients, who were generally low-income. Even after guaranteeing some abortion providers ten clients per week, the per-abortion cost remained $500. Members of the Collective used fundraising to help cover the costs of the procedure for those who couldn't afford it. In 1971, however, the Collective discovered that "Nick" was not actually a doctor, as he had claimed. This caused emotional duress for some members of the Collective, who insisted that using an abortion provider with fake credentials made them "just like the back-alleys", and that they should shutter the organization. Up to half of the group's members left after learning that their abortion provider was not an actual doctor. He was performing up to twenty abortions a day with skill, however, and other members realized: "If he can do it, then we can do it, too." As Jenny learned to perform the procedure, she was able to teach other members. It remained a limited skill, however, with only about four members trained to perform surgical abortions.

Members took over performing abortions, which enabled them to drop the price from $500–600 to $100. However, they accepted whatever amount a client was able to pay. The Jane Collective learned how to perform pap smears and found a laboratory to read the results for $4. The drop in prices resulted in more low-income clients, as well as more black clients. One black woman, Lois, criticized the group when she came to them for an abortion for their lack of diversity, as they were nearly all white and middle-class. She stated, "You guys are the white angels that are going to save everybody and where are the black women at?" Lois decided to join the Collective to help counsel its black patients. Seeking an abortion could be especially difficult for black women, as some black nationalists decried that abortion was an agent of black genocide.

The women learned several abortion methods, such as the cannula method for early stage abortions, and the super coil method used in later stage abortions which caused the women to miscarry, but the most widely used was the D&C (dilation and curettage) method.

== Legal issues and dissolution ==
It was rumored that the police intentionally turned a blind eye to the Collective's illegal activities, possibly because unwanted pregnancies and resulting abortions also occurred in their families. Some of their clients were from such families, or were even policewomen themselves. One of the women who was trained to perform abortions noted, "Neither the Chicago Police nor the Outfit/Mafia had previously bothered us though each knew of our work: we were clean, damn good, and made too little money to interest them." Pauline Bart noted that "unlike other illegal abortionists, Jane did not leave bleeding bodies in motels for the police to deal with", which could explain the years of inaction of the Chicago police regarding the Collective's activities.

In 1972, two Catholic women went to the police to report that their sister-in-law was planning on having an abortion. Two police officers arrived at one of the Collective's apartments on 3 May and asked, "where's the doctor?", looking for a male practitioner. Seven of the women working for Jane were arrested and charged with eleven counts of abortion and conspiracy to commit abortion. They became known as the "Abortion 7". While in the police van, one woman removed a stack of index cards from her purse that had the contact information of their patients. They ripped the names and addresses off of the index cards and swallowed them to protect the information. Each woman faced up to a maximum of a 110-year prison sentence, with 1–10 years possible on each count.

Jeanne Galatzer-Levy, one of the women arrested, recalled that she felt that the police treated them, the abortion providers, better than their patients. She stated, "...there were all kinds of class and race things going on with the police. They felt more like us than like the women they were supposedly protecting from us, and they kinda wanted that relationship. So that was bizarre, just bizarre." The 7 were soon released on bail.

The 7 hired an attorney, Jo-Anne Wolfson. Wolfson "really wanted the case, because she was a woman and she thought a woman should handle the case". She pursued a legal strategy of delaying the court proceedings as long as possible. It was known that the Supreme Court was currently deciding the Roe v. Wade case: a favorable ruling would make it easier for Wolfson to have the charges dismissed or obtain a more favorable plea deal. In 1973, Roe v. Wade was decided, which struck down many abortion restrictions. All of the charges against the Abortion 7 were dismissed; additionally, they were not charged with practicing without a license in exchange for not requesting the return of their medical instruments.

After abortion was legalized, the Jane Collective disbanded. One doctor offered the Jane Collective abortionists a job at her office performing abortions, but was then dissuaded by her lawyer. Several members were critical of the Roe v. Wade decision, with Laura Kaplan saying it was "written emphatically in terms of physician's rights, not women's rights". In her eyes, illegal abortion with women helping women was supplanted by a process in which men would be in charge of women's bodies once again. Linnea Johnson said, "what we did was to remand women back into the realm of male law, male custom, medical custody. Bad idea then as now." The women, who were burned-out with their mission and each other, according to Kaplan, had an "end-of-Jane party" after the first legal abortion clinics opened in the spring of 1973. They then went their separate ways. Martha Scott was later employed at a woman's health center and remained an activist for women's rights.

== Outcomes and legacy ==
In the seven years that the group existed, they performed an estimated 11,000 abortions. There were no reports of abortion-related death as a result of their work, though one member, Martha Scott, recalled that some of their patients ended up having to go to the emergency room afterwards, while others had to undergo hysterectomies. One obstetrician who provided follow-up visits for the Collective's patients stated that their safety rate was comparable to legally operating clinics in New York.

The story of the Jane Collective has been called a "motivational call to arms". Haven Coalition, a non-profit in New York City that helps out-of-town women access abortions in the city, draws inspiration from the Jane Collective for their operations. Abortion access has become increasingly restricted: By 2018, more than 1,100 abortion restrictions had been passed in the US, and the number of abortion clinics declined by nearly half since the late 1970s. A volunteer with the Haven Coalition stated, "There’s an effort to sort of preserve the vestiges of what used to be an underground railroad and something that might be again", alluding to the possibility that abortion could become illegal in the US once again. The Jane Collective has also been cited as inspiration to a loose network of American women who provide illegal abortions.

In 2022, the US Supreme Court overruled Roe v. Wade in the decision Dobbs v. Jackson Women's Health Organization. Abortion became illegal or highly restricted in several US states, with commentators noting the likely rise of underground abortion organizations as a result. Medical student and researcher Rainey Horwitz stated that "the Jane Collective really exemplified...that abortions are not medically complex procedures, especially now in 2022, when so many people can have the option to undergo a medication abortion and have to completely eliminate those risks of those surgical abortions."

=== Representation in film ===
- Jane: An Abortion Service, a 1995 documentary about the Jane Collective
- Ask for Jane, a 2018 historical drama film about the Jane Collective. Judith Arcana, a real-life member of the Jane Collective is a consulting producer on the film, in addition to making a cameo appearance
- The Janes, a feature-length documentary which premiered at the 2022 Sundance Film Festival and later streamed on HBO Max, directed by Tia Lessin and Emma Pildes
- Call Jane, a historical drama starring Elizabeth Banks and Sigourney Weaver. The film premiered at the 2022 Sundance Film Festival and was directed by Phyllis Nagy

== See also ==
- Abortion in Illinois
- Chicago Abortion Fund
