= Pauline Bart =

American sociologist (1930–2021)

- Born: Pauline Bernice Lackow; February 18, 1930; Brooklyn, New York, U.S.
- Died: October 8, 2021 (aged 91); Raleigh, North Carolina, U.S.
- Occupation: Sociologist
- Spouse: Max Bart (m. 1949, divorced)

Pauline Bernice Bart (née Lackow; February 18, 1930 – October 8, 2021) was an American sociologist who studied gender inequality, violence against women, and women's development.

== Early life ==
Pauline Bernice Lackow was born on February 18, 1930, in Brooklyn, New York. She received a BA (1950), MA (1952), and PhD (1967), all from the University of California, Los Angeles, and all in sociology. Her doctoral thesis, later published as Portnoy's Mother's Complaint, concerned depression in middle-aged women.

== Career ==
Bart's research focused on the causes of rape and the means by which women are able to avoid being raped. A study she published in 1986 found that women who fight a rapist, using verbal or physical resistance, are less likely to be raped.

Through her work, Bart studied the ways in which sexual biases propagated inequalities and harmed women. In a study in 1973, she studied language in gynaecology textbooks and pointed out how the books of that time focused not on women's reproductive health, but instead focused on male partners' happiness. She attributed this to the lack of sexual diversity among gynecologists of the time, who were ~93% male. She also critiqued the language used in gynecology textbooks of that period which taught that a woman's sexual pleasure was secondary to that of her husband and she should yield to his sex drive. Professor Jane M. Ussher, reviewing Bart's work in 2003 noted that, despite the "critical feminist gaze" Bart had aimed at gynaecology textbooks, little had changed in the 30 years since the study's publication.

During her time as a doctoral candidate, she led a study for over ten years on rape avoidance. Her studies based on conversations with many women, including her own students, led her to note her findings that fighting back was a much better strategy in deflecting assault. This finding went against the prevailing views of the time, that believed that women were better off being passive during the assault.

Building on these studies, in 1983, she testified in the anti-pornography hearings in Minneapolis that were organized by American feminist and legal activist Catharine A. MacKinnon. Along with other speakers, including Linda Boreman and other rape survivors, Bart testified on pornography's role in the incidence of coercive sex. During these hearings, she also presented research by sociologist Diana E. H. Russell who had studied violence against women. Her studies of the Jane Collective were motivated by her own abortion by a male doctor that had gone wrong, which required her to seek medical attention at a hospital.

Bart also studied depression amongst 1950s housewives after their divorces when they had become empty nesters and had found themselves without required skills to enter the job market. In a study called Portnoy's Mother's Complaint, she documented the experiences of mostly Jewish women who found their lives uprooted when they found their role in the family missing. Her mother's depression and her own struggles as a divorced mother of two children led her to pursue the study.

As of 1992, Bart was a tenured professor in the psychiatry department at University of Illinois College of Medicine. She also taught in the women's studies and sociology departments for over 20 years but was let go by the College of Arts and Sciences when a student alleged that she had discriminated against him and said he "fit the profile of a male black rapist". Bart denied that she said this. Catharine A. MacKinnon and Andrea Dworkin spoke in Bart's defense following the allegations. Another account of the same incident held that Bart had said the male student was a "believer in the rape myth".

Bart was a published author who wrote on topics including violence against women, women's studies, and rape survival strategies. Some of her works included The Student Sociologist's Handbook (1971) which she co-wrote with Linda Frankel, Stopping Rape: Successful Survival Strategies (1985) which she co-wrote with Patricia O'Brien, and Violence Against Women: The Bloody Footprints (1993) which she co-edited with Eileen Geil Moran. One of her often quoted insights linked to sociology studies was "Everything is data, but data isn't everything". Quoting Andrea Dworkin, Bart summarized her work on violence against women by saying that she was "a feminist, not the fun kind!"

== Personal life ==
Bart (née Lackow) married Max Bart, a chemical engineer by profession, in 1949. The couple separated in 1960, and she remained Bart after their divorce. Bart was the chairwoman for the Jewish Women for Affirmative Action organization and also was a member of the Subcommittee on Research and Needs for the Mayor's Commission on Childcare in Chicago.

She died on October 8, 2021, in Raleigh, North Carolina, from Alzheimer's disease. She was aged 91.

== Published works ==
- Hrsg., Bart, Pauline B. (1993). Violence against women : the bloody footprints. Sage. ISBN 0-8039-5044-6. OCLC 611769028.
- Holmstrom, Lynda Lytle; Bart, Pauline B.; O'Brien, Patricia H. (1985). "Stopping Rape: Successful Survival Strategies". Contemporary Sociology. 15 (6): 845. doi:10.2307/2071120. ISSN 0094-3061. JSTOR 2071120.
- Pauline., Bart (1986). The student sociologist's handbook. Random House. OCLC 643896354.
- Bart, Pauline B.; Grossman, Marlyn (1978), "Menopause", The Woman Patient, Boston, MA: Springer US, pp. 337–354, doi:10.1007/978-1-4615-8840-5_25, ISBN 978-1-4615-8842-9
