= Judith Arcana =

American writer

- Born: 5 February 1943; Cleveland, Ohio, United States
- Died: 20 December 2025 (aged 82)
- Writing career
- Language: English
- Notable work: What if your mother
- Website: juditharcana.com

Judith Arcana was an American writer of poems, stories, essays and books. She was a teacher for forty years and her writing has appeared in journals and anthologies since the early 1980s. She has been an activist for reproductive justice since spending two years in the Jane Collective, Chicago's underground abortion service (1970–72). Arcana is notable for her insistence on the organically political nature of art and literature.

== Personal life ==
Born February 5, 1943, in Cleveland, Ohio, she is the daughter of Anne Solomon and Norman Rosenfield. Following the death of Anne Rosenfield in March 1944, Norman Rosenfield married Ida Epstein in July 1945.

Arcana was raised with communist and socialist extended family, which she has credited in part for her activism.

Arcana's family moved frequently during her childhood, with stints in Milwaukee and Gary, Indiana, where they attended an Orthodox synagogue, as it was the only synagogue in the area. Arcana did not have a bat mitzvah, as it was not common in her community at the time.

At a young age, Arcana decided to become a teacher, "partly out of interest and partly because, in those days, there were only a few things a girl could be".

== Career ==
Judith Arcana's first teaching job was at the high school she graduated from, Niles Township High School (East Division) in Illinois. She did her student teaching there in spring of 1964 and returned in the fall as a full time teacher after graduating from Northwestern University with a BA in English. She taught at Niles until the spring of 1970, when the school board fired her – despite tenure – along with two other teachers (John Palm and Nancy Tripp). Although officially the three were fired due to "not keeping attendance correctly," Arcana has said that both the teachers and students knew they had been fired due to students' political beliefs and actions. Arcana and Palm pursued a public hearing regarding their firings, which lasted months; the hearing ultimately upheld the firings. Arcana has credited this public hearing as her political awakening.

After the dissolution of the Jane Collective, where she had worked between 1970 and 1972, Arcana began teaching classes on bodies and sexuality at high schools and colleges. She also taught these classes weekly at Dwight Prison through the Women's Union. She also undertook an Urban Preceptorship in Preventive Medicine (University of Illinois Medical School 1973).

Arcana worked at Columbia College Chicago, teaching Bodies classes and women's literature.

She earned an MA in Women's Studies (Goddard College 1979) and a PhD in literature (Loyola University of Chicago 1989).

Her last teaching job was at the Union Graduate School (which has since morphed into the Union Institute & University). She began work there as a dean in early 1989 and left, as faculty emerita, in the early 2000s. At Union, Arcana was a dean in the Graduate College, Founding Director of the Center for Women, adviser to interdisciplinary doctoral students, and a convener of residential colloquium and seminars.

== Abortion rights activism ==
Arcana was involved in the Jane Collective from 1970 to 1972, working primarily in Chicago. She became involved after thinking she was pregnant and seeking out an abortion; although she was not actually pregnant, she was invited to join the Jane Collective. Her first job was as a "callback Jane", taking phone calls from women seeking abortions. By the end of 1970, Arcana also began counseling the women being helped, and she later also performed medical procedures. Within the group, the decision was eventually made to pay the Janes $25 a week for each job they did; at one point, Arcana made $75 a week, as she was doing administrative, counseling, and medical work. She primarily put these payments towards food and rent.

Arcana gave birth to a son in October 1971, and took maternity leave into early 1972, returning to do some office work. She was arrested for her work on her first full day back, May 3, 1972, for driving women to their abortion appointments; she was released the following day. In September 1972, she and six other Janes arrested on May 3 were indicted on "charges of felony homicide and conspiracy to commit abortion". The case never came to trial, however, with the charges being dropped with the Roe v. Wade Supreme Court decision in January 1973. Arcana was one of the Janes who advocated to continue their services following the decisions, but was swayed with the argument that they would now be practicing medicine without a license.

Arcana is featured in the feminist history film She's Beautiful When She's Angry. She is the consulting producer on the 2018 historical drama film Ask for Jane, in addition to making a cameo appearance. The film is based on the Jane Collective. She is also featured in the award-winning documentary,The Janes, on which her son, Daniel, is a co-producer.

== Writing ==
Arcana became interested in writing at age three, but did not write seriously until she was in her 20s.

Her two prose books about motherhood – Our Mothers’ Daughters (1979) and Every Mother’s Son (1983) – are radical feminist analysis; both have been read, taught and discussed for many years in the US, Canada and the UK. Grace Paley’s Life Stories, A Literary Biography (1993), is Judith's study of the American writer/activist who died in August 2007. The initial interviews, research and draft for that book comprise her doctoral dissertation.

Arcana's poetry collection What if your mother (2005) offers poems and monologues examining a constellation of motherhood themes including abortion, adoption, miscarriage and the biotechnology of childbirth, as well as the daily experience of mothering. In her review of the collection in Affilia, Merle Hoffman describes Arcana's poems as "maps of interior psychological and physiological journeys" that meet the unnamed experience (abortion) "with bold lyricism, passion, and creative imagery.

In 2008-2009, Arcana collaborated with Ash Creek Press in Portland, Oregon to publish The Ash Creek Series: an elegant signed/numbered edition folding broadside of five short poems (POEMS), a manuscript in a cartoon envelope – perhaps her most autobiographical work so far (Family Business), and 4th Period English, a chapbook of poems about immigration and related themes, spoken primarily in the voices of high school students.

In the late 2010s, Arcana hosted a radio show on poetry on KBOO.

== Personal life ==
Arcana has lived in Portland, Oregon since 1995. She is Jewish.

She married a lawyer when she was 21; the two later divorced.

Arcana died December 20, 2025, in Portland, Oregon.

== Published works ==
=== Book-length ===
- Arcana, Judith (September 2019). Hello. This Is Jane. Left Fork. ISBN 978-1-945824-27-2.
- What if your mother, Goshen: Chicory Blue Press, 2005 ISBN 1-887344-11-X
- Grace Paley's Life Stories, A Literary Biography, Champaign: University of Illinois Press, 1994, 1993 ISBN 0-252-06447-X
- Every Mother's Son, US and UK: The Women's Press, 1996, 1992; Seattle: Seal Press, 1986; London: The Women's Press, 1983; New York: Doubleday, 1983, ISBN 0-931188-39-3
- Our Mothers' Daughters, US and UK: The Women's Press, 1996, 1992; Berkeley: Shameless Hussy Press, 1986, 1979; London: The Women's Press, ISBN 0-915288-38-9

=== Other ===
- A Two-Judith Conversation- ECLECTICA Magazine, Volume 13, #3 - summer 2009
- 4th Period English (Ash Creek Series) 2009 ISBN 0-615-28183-4
- Correspondence and The Man Who Loves Trees + What the birds say, Writers Dojo (online) end of January 2009
- A Matter of Fact Feminist studies, Fall 2008
- There are no stars and If I Tell You and Not in China Thresholds, Fall/Winter 2008
- One rosy brown egg Oregonian 10/5/08
- You May Have Heard About My Situation and guest editor essay Persimmon Tree (online) Fall 2008
- Crows, Junctures 2008
- POEMS - folded broadside, signed/numbered edition (Ash Creek Series) 2008
- Family Business - chapbook ms in envelope (Ash Creek Series) 2008
- Midrash on Falling, Bridges spring 2008
- Facts of Life and tiny essay Letters to the World, 2008
- Past Lives Passager winter 2008
- In the cards blossombones (online) #1, 2008
- Lois, Questions blossombones (online) #1, 2008* The Woman Sitting Next to Death blossombones (online) #1, 2008
- Remembering Grace off our backs, Vol 37, #2/3 2008
- Whenever I Come to It Walking Bridges Using Poetry as a Compass, late 2007 + Bridges 12/2-Fall
- Eight + tiny essay in Umbrella, late 2007 (online)
- Laughing and Thinking at the Same Time Persimmon Tree (online) 12/15/07
- folio of poems, Young Mothers issue, ARM Journal 9/1, 2007
- Celia Young Mothers issue of ARM Journal 9/1, late 2007
- For All the Mary Catholics White Ink, late 2007
- Felony Booking White Ink, late 2007
- National and Public Bridges, fall 2007 (12/2)
- Anecdotal Evidence of the Effects of Women’s Liberation on Male Children 5AM, Summer 2007 (#26)
- Maggie Answers Aunt Sylvia’s Question Persimmon Tree, June 2007 Persimmontree Magazine | 23 | Fall 2012
- The Elders Repeat Themselves Umbrella, Summer 2007
- Not Like That Umbrella, Summer 2007
- Musee des Beaux Arts (further west, later on, for David) Studio, 2007 1/1
- A child said what is the grass Studio, 2007 1/1
- The Man Who Loves Trees Studio, 2007 1/1
- 86 in Diner, 2007 Volume 6
- Snow, Fall Not What I Expected, 2007
- Birth Days Passager Winter, 2007 (& on their website spring/summer 2007)
