= LGBTQ rights in Illinois =

- Illinois (US)
- Legal status: Legal since 1962
- Gender identity: Sex reassignment surgery not required to change gender on official documents
- Discrimination protections: Protections for sexual orientation and gender identity (see below)

Family rights
- Recognition of relationships: Civil unions since 2011; Same-sex marriage since 2014
- Adoption: Same-sex couples may jointly adopt

Illinois is seen as one of the most progressive states in the U.S. in regard to lesbian, gay, bisexual, transgender, and queer (LGBTQ) rights and often viewed as one of the most liberal states in the Midwestern United States. Same-sex sexual activity has been legal since 1962, after Illinois became the first U.S. state to repeal its sodomy laws. Same-sex marriage was banned by statute in 1996, but has since been legalized after a law allowing such marriages was signed by Governor Pat Quinn on November 20, 2013 and went into effect on June 1, 2014. Since January 1, 2015 the Constitution of Illinois legally prevents sexual orientation discrimination on the right to vote within Illinois.

Civil unions have been recognized since 2011, and same-sex couples are also allowed to adopt. Additionally, discrimination on the basis of sexual orientation and gender identity is banned in employment, housing, credit and public accommodations, and conversion therapy on minors has been outlawed since 2016.

Chicago has a vibrant LGBTQ community. The first pride parade took place in 1970, a year after the Stonewall riots. Since 2013, the Chicago Pride Parade has attracted about 1 million attendees each year. 2019 polling from the Public Religion Research Institute showed that 74% of Illinois residents supported anti-discrimination legislation protecting LGBTQ people.

== Law regarding same-sex sexual activity ==
In 1795, Illinois as part of the Northwest Territory inherited the English "buggery" law, which punished sodomy with death. In 1819, after statehood, it enacted its own statute which outlawed sodomy with one to five years' imprisonment, a fine of 100-500 dollars and between 100 and 500 lashes. A change in 1874 resulted in the maximum imprisonment penalty being set at 10 years. The first reported sodomy case occurred in 1897 in Honselman v. People where the Supreme Court of Illinois ruled that fellatio (oral sex), whether heterosexual or homosexual, was a violation of the sodomy law; the first such case in the United States. In 1913, in People v. Smith, the court held that cunnilingus was not a "crime against nature", stating that "without a male sexual organ, there could be no sodomy". In 1950, in People v. Whitham, the court rejected the contentions of a heterosexual man that sodomy could only be accomplished between same-sex partners.

In 1938, the Illinois General Assembly passed a "psychopathic offender" law, under which anyone suffering from a "mental disorder" and who had "criminal propensities to the commission of sex crimes" was considered and legally labelled a "sexual psychopath". The law was upheld by the Illinois Supreme Court in 1943 in People v. Sims. The statute was amended in 1951 to permit examination of any prisoner "at suitable intervals" to see if he or she "has become a criminal sexual psychopath." It also provided that any prisoner convicted of certain crimes, including the "crime against nature", be examined upon release from prison to see if the person was a "criminal sexual psychopath". The law was reportedly widely used against offenders who had engaged in consensual sexual activity.

On July 28, 1961, Illinois enacted a new state law code, that became effective on January 1, 1962, and eliminated the state's sodomy laws. It was the first state to eliminate its sodomy laws and established an age of consent of 18. However, a major oversight was soon discovered, as the laws against the "infamous crime against nature either with man or beast" were not included in the Criminal Code of 1961, meaning that for a brief period of time, bestiality was technically legal in the state of Illinois. The code also made it a crime to commit a "lewd fondling or caress of the body of another person of the same sex" in a public place. In 1963, the General Assembly passed a new law that changed the words "the same sex" to "either sex". In 1984, the "lewd fondling or caress" law was repealed and the age of consent was lowered to 16. On January 1, 2012, the age of consent was raised to 17.

In 1970, Illinois voters approved a constitutional amendment which grants people the right "to be secure in their persons, houses, papers and other possessions against unreasonable searches and seizures, invasions of privacy or interceptions of communications".

== Recognition of same-sex relationships ==
=== Marriage ===
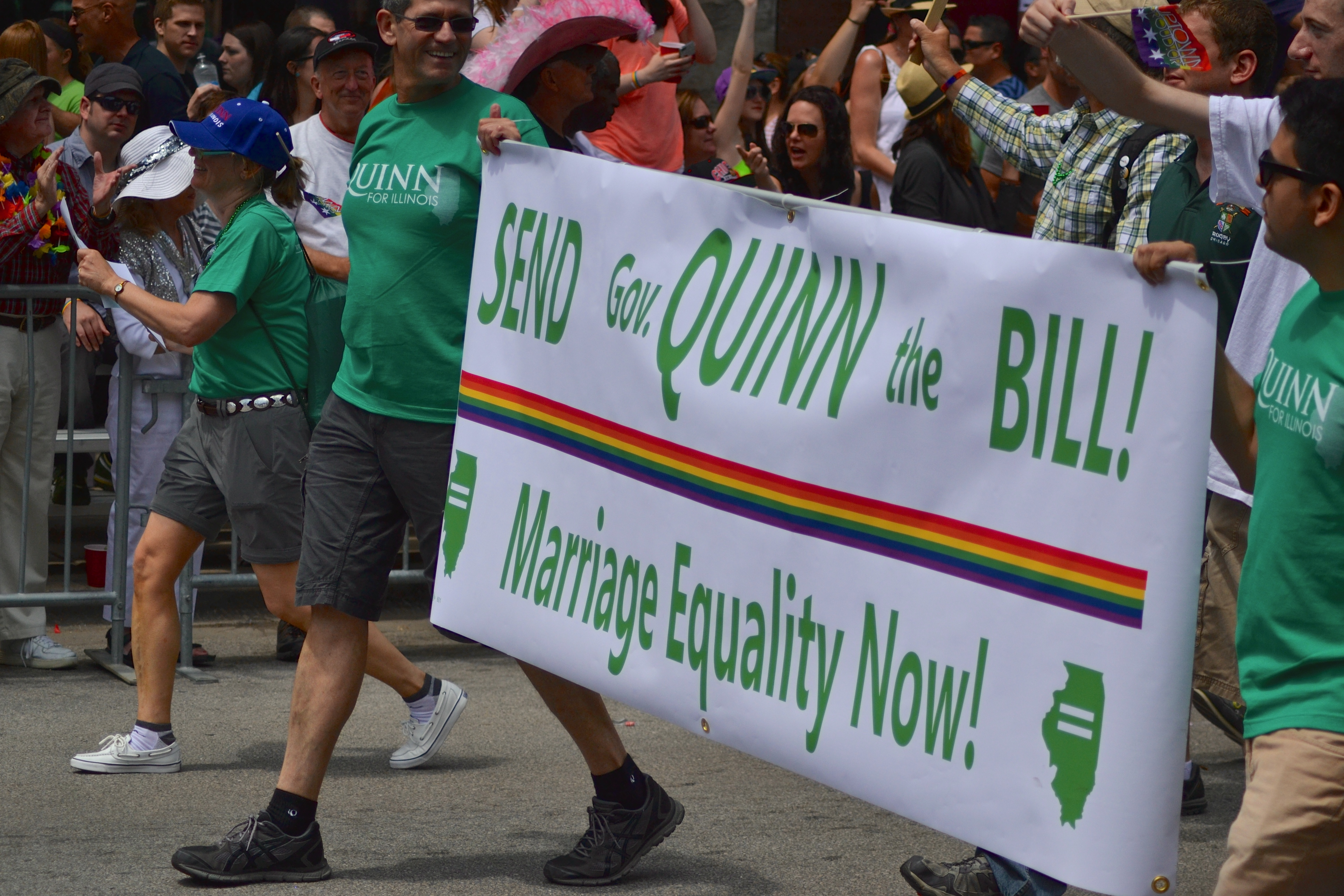
Supporters pushing for the legalisation of same-sex marriage.

- SB 1773

SB 1773, introduced by Representative Tom Johnson in 1996, amended the Illinois Marriage and Dissolution of Marriage Act to preclude out-of-state recognition of same-sex marriage and reinforce the state's marriage ban in light of Baehr v. Lewin in Hawaii. It was vigorously opposed, with 12,000 letters being written by clergymen, parishioners and other citizens of all faiths. Representatives Ronen, Schakowsky and Currie led the futile effort to defeat the bill, with Ronen stating at one point, "...don't delude yourself, to think that you are doing God's work. I would remind you that a long list of clergy and religious groups have forcefully spoken out against this Bill." The bill passed 42–9 in the Senate and 87–13 (with 6 abstentions) in the House. The bill was signed in May 1996.

- SB 10 (Marriage)

Same-sex marriage was legalized via statute in November 2013, after the Illinois House of Representatives narrowly approved same-sex marriage legislation by 61 votes to 54 (achieving the 60 vote required threshold). The Illinois Senate subsequently approved the legislation 32–21 (achieving the 30 vote required threshold). Barack Obama (then-President of the United States and former Senator of Illinois) welcomed the bill, stating on his Instagram page: "Congratulations, Illinois. Love is love." The bill was signed by Democratic governor Pat Quinn on November 20, and it went into effect June 1, 2014. In July 2021, the governor of Illinois signed a bill into law to legally provide individuals a gender-neutral marriage certificate available. In May 2023, both houses of the Illinois Legislature passed a bill to formally repeal three marriage law sections (dating back to 1972) regarding getting married within Illinois from other jurisdictions that makes a marriage within Illinois "null and void" if the marriage is not recommended, licensed or recognized from that particular jurisdiction by error or bad judgement. The governor of Illinois signed the bill in 2023, making it effective in 2024.

=== Civil unions ===
On January 31, 2011, Governor Pat Quinn signed legislation that recognizes same-sex civil unions, effective from June 1, 2011. The law allows the state to recognize same-sex marriages performed outside of Illinois as the equivalent of an Illinois civil union. If a person undergoes sex reassignment surgery, the marriage is still recognized by the state, even though the parties to the marriage are of the same sex.

Illinois has provided benefits to same-sex partners of state employees since 2006.

In 2012, legislation to repeal the state's recognition of same-sex civil unions was introduced in the House of Representatives, but was defeated.

=== Lawsuits ===
In May 2012, Lambda Legal and the American Civil Liberties Union filed lawsuits in state court challenging the refusal of the Cook County clerk's office to issue marriage licenses to same-sex couples. Both contended that the Illinois Marriage and Dissolution of Marriage Act violated the Illinois Constitution's guarantees of equal protection and due process. These lawsuits have since been abandoned due to the State General Assembly passing a same-sex marriage law in November 2013.

On February 21, 2014, a federal judge authorized Cook County to issue marriage licenses to same-sex couples without waiting for the Illinois statute legalizing same-sex marriage to take effect on June 1, and the county clerk began issuing licenses immediately.

== Discrimination protections and anti-bullying laws ==
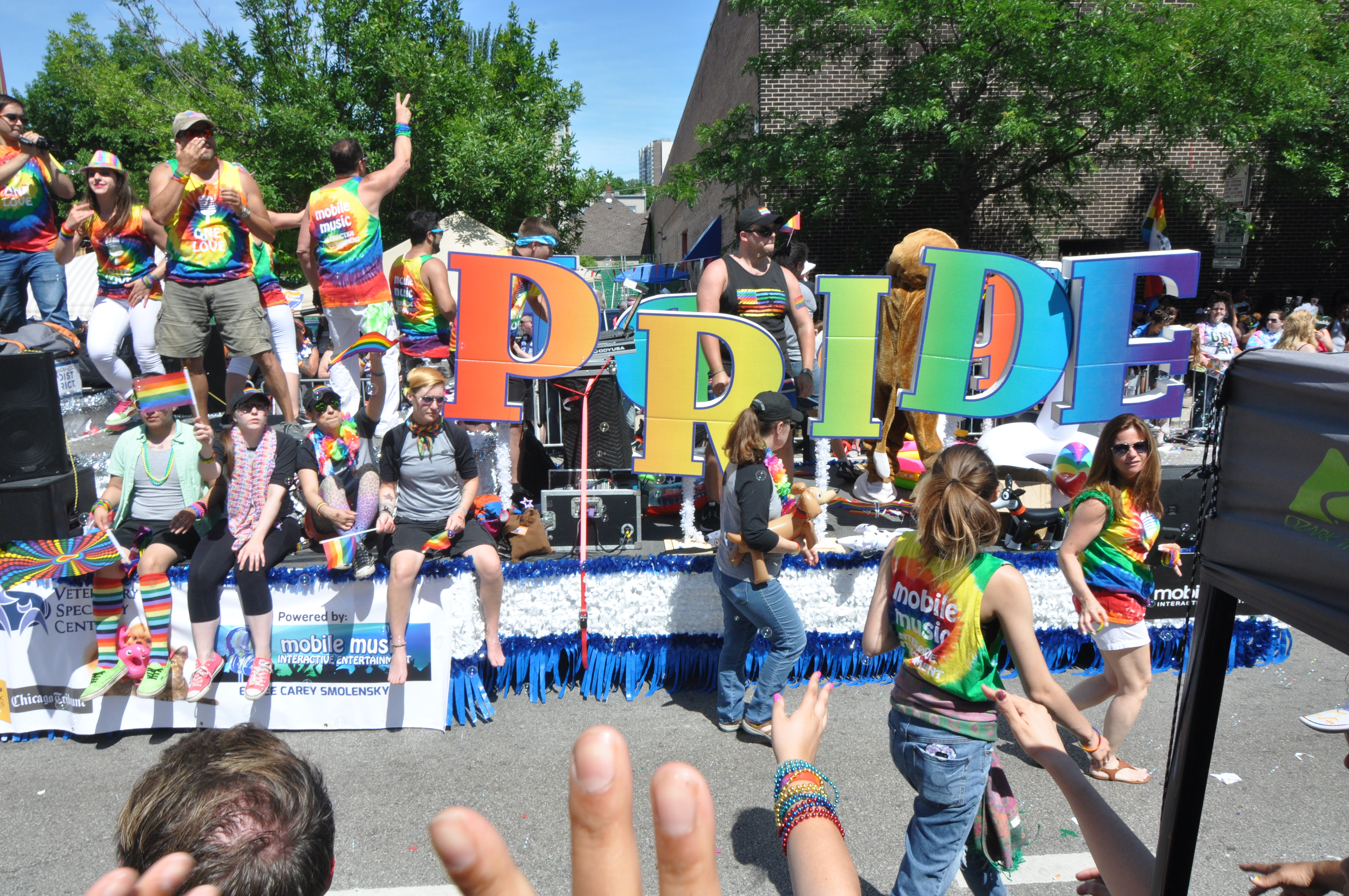
The 2018 edition of Chicago Pride

Since June 1, 2006, Illinois has protected LGBT persons from unfair discrimination. The state's anti-discrimination law applies to the areas of employment, housing, public accommodations and credit, and forbids discrimination on the grounds of "race, color, religion, sex, national origin, ancestry, age, order of protection status, marital status, physical or mental disability, military status, sexual orientation, pregnancy, or unfavorable discharge from military service". The definition of sexual orientation explicitly includes gender identity. The Illinois Human Rights Act states: "'Sexual orientation' means actual or perceived heterosexuality, homosexuality, bisexuality, or gender-related identity, whether or not traditionally associated with the person's designated sex at birth. 'Sexual orientation' does not include a physical or sexual attraction to a minor by an adult."

The city of Chicago enacted an anti-discrimination ordinance of its own in 1988.

In 2014, Illinois expanded its anti-bullying laws to make them inclusive of LGBTQ people. Illinois law prohibits bullying based on race, color, religion, sex, national origin, ancestry, age, marital status, physical or mental disability, military status, sexual orientation, gender identity or expression, unfavorable discharge from military service, association with a person or group with one or more of the aforementioned actual or perceived characteristics, or any other distinguishing characteristic. The legislation requires school districts, charter schools and non-sectarian private schools to strengthen their anti-bullying policies in order to provide a safe learning environment for all students, including investigating reports of bullying, protecting the privacy of students, prohibiting false accusations and training staff to properly address incidents.

In June 2018, the Illinois General Assembly passed a bill to repeal the "15 or more employees in a company or business" loophole, which had exempted businesses with less than 15 employees from the state's anti-discrimination law. In August 2018, Governor Bruce Rauner vetoed the bill, and no attempts to override his veto were undertaken before the General Assembly adjourned sine die in January 2019. A similar bill to repeal the 15 employee loophole passed both chambers of the General Assembly in May 2019, was signed into law by Governor J. B. Pritzker in August 2019 and went into effect on July 1, 2020.

In May 2019, the General Assembly passed a bill, passing the House by a vote of 115–0 and the Senate by 54 votes to 0, to add "sexual orientation" as a prohibited ground of discrimination in jury selections. Governor J. B. Pritzker signed the bill into law in August 2019, and it went into effect on January 1, 2020.

=== Illinois corporate boards ===
In June 2021, a bill passed the Illinois General Assembly to provide LGBTQ inclusion and quotas on corporate boards within Illinois. The governor of Illinois signed the bill into law in August 2021 and will go into effect from January 1, 2022.

=== Domestic violence ===
The Illinois Domestic Violence Act, which protects people who share or used to share a dwelling or a "dating relationship" with their abusers, is written in gender-neutral language and is applicable to same-sex partners.

== Illinois school students with trauma and book protection ==
Effective from January 1, 2023 school students throughout Illinois with trauma for an "health and safety reasoning justification" on the basis of sexual orientation and gender identity - are to be legally protected explicitly within legislation. Since January 1, 2024 Illinois became the first US state to explicitly protect “LGBTIQ-themed books within libraries and book depositories” by legislation.

== Adoption and parenting ==
The state permits adoption by gay individuals or partners, including second-parent adoptions. In addition, lesbian couples have access to in vitro fertilization. State law recognizes the non-genetic, non-gestational mother as a legal parent to a child born via donor insemination, irrespective of the marital status of the parents.

Under the Illinois Gestational Surrogacy Act, gestational surrogacy contracts are legal. When parties enter into a surrogacy agreement that complies with the state statute, no court action is required to obtain a birth certificate with the names of the intended parents. So long as certifications are completed by all the parties, attorneys, and a physician involved, and so long as those certifications are received by the hospital prior to the birth of the child, the birth certificate is issued in the names of the intended parents. Same-sex couples are treated in the same manner as opposite-sex couples. The legal status of traditional surrogacy contracts is less clear, as state law makes no mention of the practice.

=== 1973 Illinois infertility law ===
In May 2021, the Illinois General Assembly passed a bill to repeal the 1973 Illinois infertility laws (that do not legally cover same-sex couples for insurance purposes) - when IVF just got established in 1973. The governor of Illinois J. B. Pritzker signed the bill into law and went into effect January 1, 2022.

=== IVF services sanctuary state ===
Illinois is officially an "IVF services sanctuary state".

== Hate crime law ==
Since 1991, Illinois has had hate crime legislation that includes actual or perceived sexual orientation. Crimes committed based on the victim(s)' sexual orientation (alongside race, religion, sex, etc.) may receive harsher legal penalties. The law did not explicitly include gender identity as such, but gender identity cases could be prosecuted as perceived sexual orientation cases.

On April 16 and on May 20, 2015, the House and the Senate unanimously passed HB 3930 to add "gender identity" to the Illinois hate crime statute. On July 20, 2015, the bill was signed into law by Governor Bruce Rauner, and it became effective on January 1, 2016.

== Gay panic defense ==
In June 2017, the Illinois General Assembly unanimously passed SB1761 to repeal the gay and trans panic defense. Governor Bruce Rauner signed the bill into law on August 25, 2017, and it went into effect on January 1, 2018.

== Transgender and intersex rights ==
=== Gender-affirming care ===
Even though reassignment surgery is not a formal requirement for a legal gender change anymore, if the applicant, aged at least 21, wishes to undergo the procedure, Illinois Medicaid will cover the costs.

In January 2023, a bill passed both houses of the Illinois General Assembly to "legally protect and defend gender-affirming care" within Illinois - as well as individuals coming from outside Illinois to seek gender-affirming services inside Illinois. The governor of Illinois signed the legislation into law on January 13, 2023. It went into effect immediately.

In June 2024, it was announced that the Illinois Department of Human Services and the Public Health Institute of Metropolitan Chicago would expand gender-affirming care through a new state program called the Transgender and Gender Diverse (TGD) Wellness and Equity Program.

=== Birth certificate reforms ===
In the past, Illinois law permitted reassignment on birth certificates, but a major obstacle prevented some from being able to. Any person could legally change their legal gender, but in order to legally change it, the state required transgender people to have "an operation(s) having the effect of reflecting, enhancing, changing, reassigning or otherwise affecting gender." This was interpreted to at least include sex reassignment surgery, facial laser hair removal, facial electrolysis, and chest surgery. This was an obstacle because some could not afford the required medical treatment and some do not personally feel surgery is needed. On May 31, 2017, the Illinois General Assembly passed legislation (by a vote of 63–43 in the House and 32–22 in the Senate) to abolish the sex reassignment surgery requirement. Governor Bruce Rauner signed the bill into law on August 25, 2017, and it went into effect on January 1, 2018. To change the gender marker on a birth certificate, the applicant must submit to the Department of Public Health two completed forms—the "Affidavit and Certificate of Correction Request" and the "Declaration of Gender Transition/Intersex Condition"— and the pay the $15 fee. The affidavit must be completed by the applicant, and the declaration of gender transition must be completed by a licensed health care professional or licensed mental health professional. The Secretary of State will correct the gender marker on a driver's license and state ID card upon receipt of a completed "Gender Designation Change Form".

In June 2019, it was reported that a cisgender woman was denied a change of sex designation on her birth certificate, due to red tape as being incorrectly listed as a male decades ago. This was immediately corrected by the Illinois Department of Health office, only after the U.S. news media reported on the matter.

In July 2020, a "third gender" option (known as "X") became available (alongside "male" and "female") on birth certificates. A similar option will be available on driver's licenses from 2024.

In January 2020, a transgender father in Illinois sought to be recognized on his daughter's birth certificate, but was initially denied as the parent who gives birth was automatically listed as "mother". After approaching the Illinois Department of Public Health, with the help of Lambda Legal, it eventually decided to update its birth certificate forms to allow for a father to be listed as the birth parent.

In February 2021, representatives Jennifer Gong-Gershowitz, Daniel Didech, Anna Moeller, Margaret Croke, Maura Hirschauer and Dagmara Avelar introduced legislation to the Illinois House to remove language from the vital records law requiring the State Registrar of Vital Records to issue a new birth certificate upon receipt of a declaration stating that the applicant has undergone treatment for the purpose of gender transition or that the individual has an intersex condition, instead providing that a new birth certificate must be issued by the State Registrar upon receipt of a statement signed by the applicant attesting to making the request for the purpose of affirming their gender identity or intersex condition and that the sex designation on the person's certificate should therefore be changed. In April 2021, the Illinois House of Representatives passed the birth certificate reforms bill by a vote of 66-45. The bill was postponed in the Illinois Senate, due to time constraints and other factors. In January 2023, the birth certificate reform bill was re-introduced, revived and then formally passed, signed and enacted into law - by both the Illinois General Assembly and the governor of Illinois a month later in February. The legislation will go into effect from July 1.

Since July 1, 2024 individuals born outside of Illinois can legally allow a change of sex on a personal birth certificate - under enacted laws and reforms, by passing both houses of the Illinois Legislature and signed by the Governor of Illinois.

=== Gender-neutral bathroom access ===
In May 2016, when the existing Chicago Human Rights Ordinance said that bathroom access should be determined by the gender marker on a person's ID card, Chicago Mayor Rahm Emanuel proposed a new ordinance with this language: "Each person determines his or her own gender identity; no proof shall be required except his or her expression of his or her gender." The proposal was co-sponsored by 14th Ward Alderman Ed Burke and the City Council’s LGBT Caucus. The City Council approved the new ordinance a month later.

In May 2019, the Illinois General Assembly passed a bill to designate all public single-occupancy restroom facilities as gender-neutral. The legislation passed the House by 109 votes to 5, and the Senate in a 53–0 vote. Governor J. B. Pritzker signed the bill into law in July 2019 and it became effective on January 1, 2020. Numerous other states have similar legislation.

In April 2021, the Illinois House of Representatives passed 63-43 an additional "housekeeping bill" - to repeal a loophole from 2019 that would additionally include for "multi-occupancy bathrooms" as well, not just single bathroom occupancy already implemented to be "all or any gender inclusive" legally. The bill just automatically "lapsed" in the Illinois Senate. In May 2023, a very similar bathroom bill formally passed both houses of the Illinois General Assembly - with numerous amendments to "not force businesses and/or restaurants of any size to change signage, doors, urinals or disrupt interstate commerce", instead just "permit and allow" gender-neutral usage of bathrooms within Illinois for transgender and non-binary individuals throughout the state. The governor of Illinois is yet to either sign or veto the bill.

Since December 2021, all public schools within Chicago legally have all gender bathrooms available by clear signage.

=== Intersex rights ===
In July 2020, the Lurie Children's Hospital apologised for past usage of surgery on intersex infants to make their genitalia appear more typically male or female without proper consent. The hospital announced it would cease to perform such interventions, unless medically necessary. Dr. Ellie Kim was the first doctor at Lurie Children's Hospital to speak out publicly against the surgeries.

=== Funeral and burial instructions ===
On August 20, 2015, Governor Bruce Rauner signed HB 3552 which allows a person to specify their gender identity and preferred gender pronouns in funeral and burial instructions. The law became effective on January 1, 2016. The bill had passed 79–34 in the Illinois House on April 14, 2015 and the Illinois Senate in a unanimous 49–0 vote on May 26, 2015.

== Des Plaines clothing law ==
In July 2021, Des Plaines, Illinois repealed a law banning "the wearing of clothing geared for the opposite-sex".

== LGBT history in schools ==
Sex education lessons in Illinois are not compulsory, but schools that do teach it must provide students with age-appropriate, evidence-based, and medically accurate information concerning contraceptives and sexually transmitted diseases (including HIV) through Year 6 to 12 (age 11–18). Parents may choose to have their child(ren) opt-out.

In May 2019, the Illinois General Assembly passed a bill (HB246) with 46 Democratic co-sponsors (passing the House by 60 votes to 42 and the Senate by 37 votes to 17) to implement an LGBT curriculum that would require public schools to educate students on contributions made by the LGBT community to Illinois and United States history. Governor J. B. Pritzker signed the bill into law in August 2019 and it went into effect on July 1, 2020.

Bullying on the basis of sexual orientation and gender identity, amongst other characteristics, is explicitly prohibited under Illinois law. On June 30, 2019, Governor J. B. Pritzker signed an executive order, effective immediately, to protect transgender students in schools. Among others, the order established a task force to direct the state Board of Education to promote transgender students' rights in schools and develop procedures for concerns such as names, pronouns, and dress codes.

In May 2021, the Illinois General Assembly passed a bill on mandatory K-12 sex education for all Illinois public school students. The Governor of Illinois in August 2021 signed the bill into law and becomes effective 1 year later (i.e. August 1, 2022).

=== Teachers Union Chicago ===
In April 2025, it was reported that the Teachers Union Chicago overwhelmingly voted to “protect and defend inclusion within LGBTQ rights and protections immediately.” It goes into effect within 30 days after the platform is published and printed.

== HIV laws ==
In May 2021, the Illinois General Assembly passed a bill to repeal a 1983 HIV infection public health law. The governor of Illinois signed the bill into law and went into effect immediately.

== Conversion therapy ==
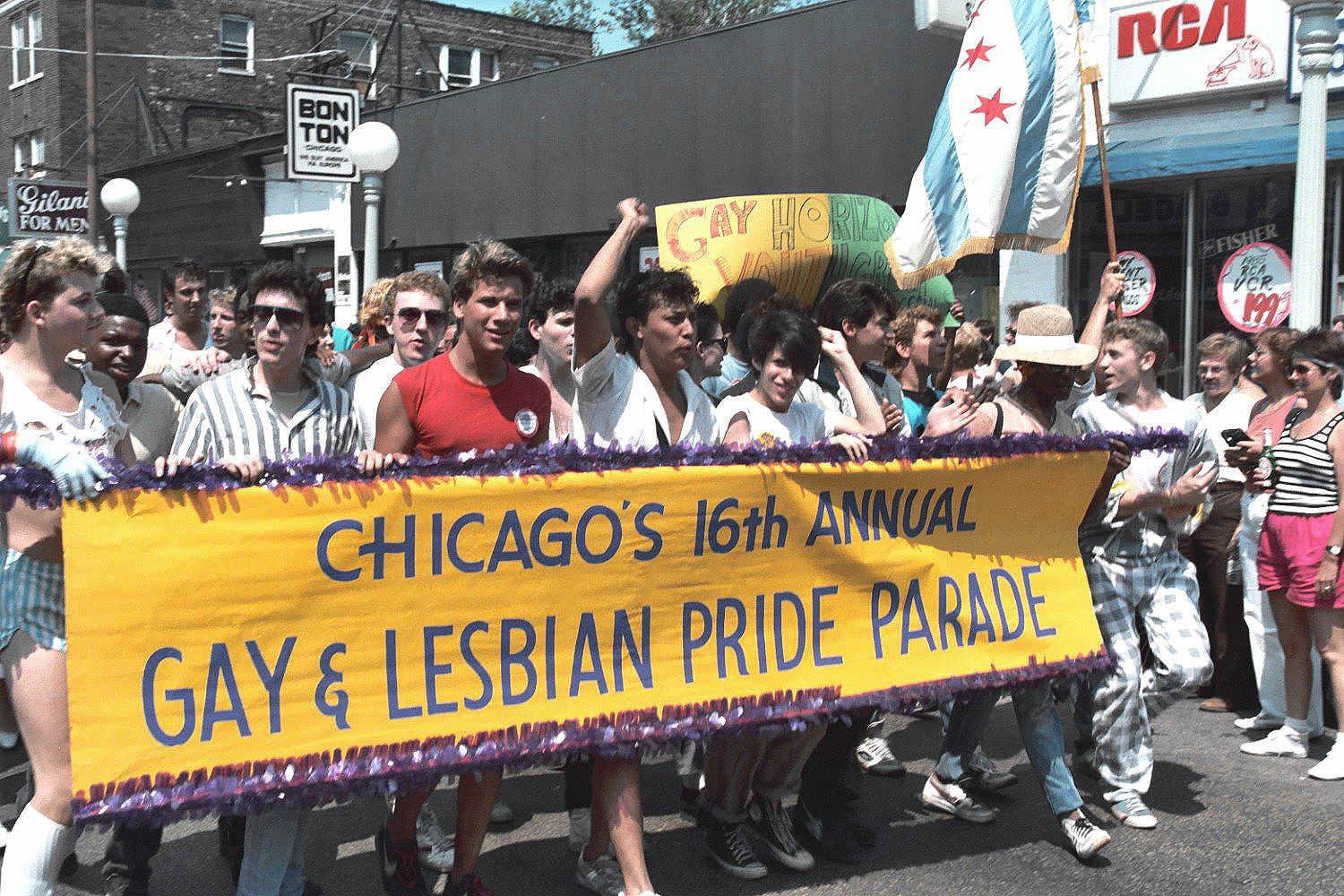
The Chicago Pride parade in 1985

On April 10, 2014, a bill that would have banned sexual orientation change efforts (conversion therapy) failed in the Illinois House of Representatives with a 44–51 vote and 22 members not voting.

The bill was reintroduced in the 2015 legislative session as the Youth Mental Health Protection Act. On May 19, 2015, the state House passed the ban in a 68–43 vote, and on May 29 the Senate passed it in a 34–19 vote. On August 20, 2015, Governor Bruce Rauner signed it into law. It prohibits mental health providers from attempting to practice conversion therapy on minors under 18. The law became effective on January 1, 2016, making Illinois the fifth state or territory in the United States to ban conversion therapy.

On February 15, 2017, the U.S. District Court for the Northern District of Illinois dismissed a suit by Illinois pastors as nonjusticiable, ruling that pastors are not subject to the Illinois conversion therapy ban because private religious counseling is not "trade or commerce."

== Military service benefits restoration ==
In August 2021, the governor of Illinois signed a bill into law - that implemented immediate restoration of US military service benefits for discharged LGBT veterans (prior to the September 2011 repeal of the US DADT policy). Connecticut, Rhode Island, California, Nevada and New York State have similar laws.

== Public opinion ==
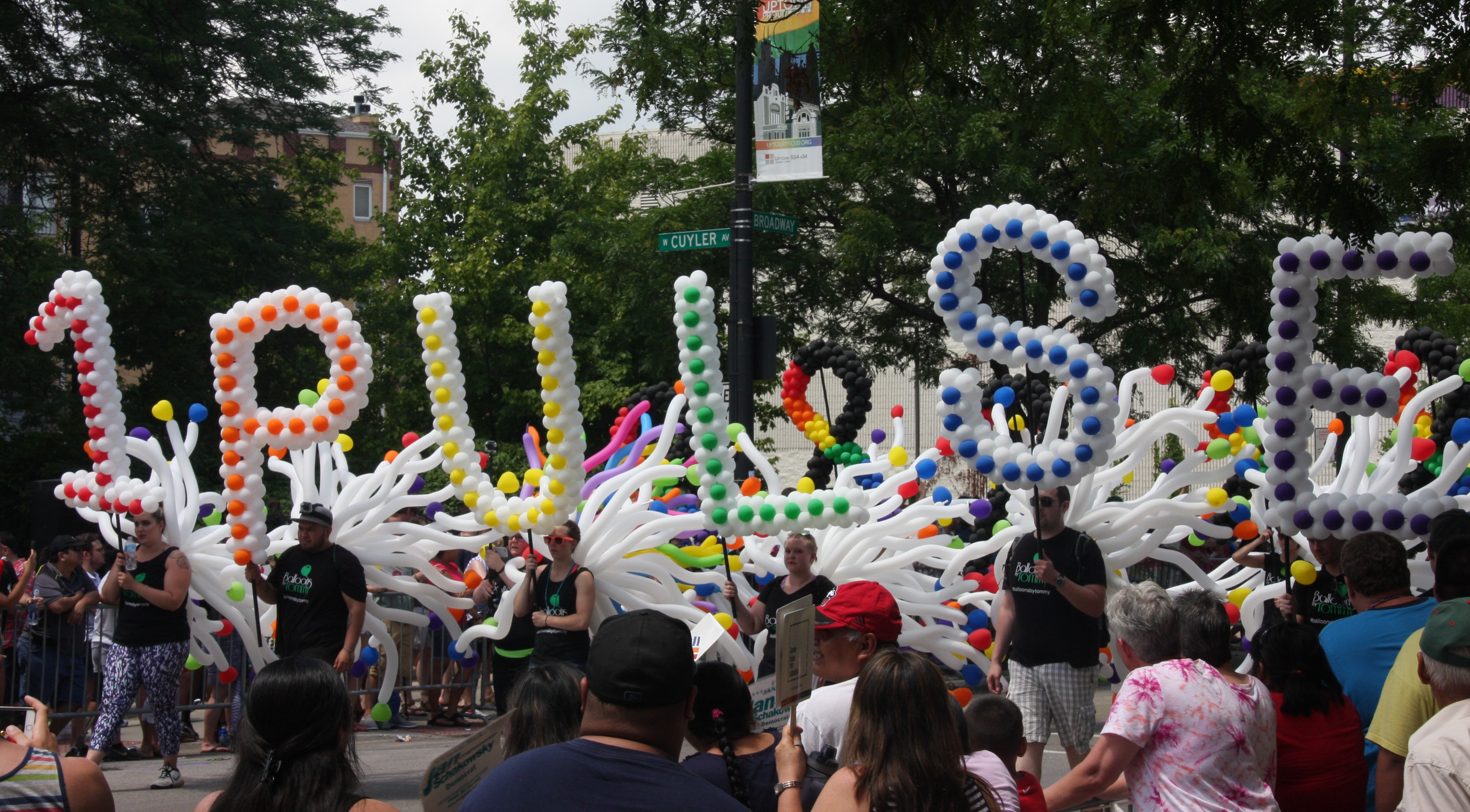
Participants of the 2016 Chicago Pride parade commemorating the victims of the Pulse shooting.

A February 2013 Crain's/Ipsos poll found that 50% of Illinois residents favored the same-sex marriage bill under consideration by the General Assembly, while 29% opposed it. The survey also found that feelings were stronger among those favoring legalization. A majority of Illinois residents supported civil unions, health benefits for partners, and protections from hate crimes and discrimination.

An October 2013 poll commissioned by Equality Illinois showed that 52% of respondents favored same-sex marriage, while 40% were opposed. 8% were undecided on the issue.

According to a poll conducted between February 28 and March 10, 2015 by Southern Illinois University Carbondale's Paul Simon Public Policy Institute of Illinois 54.9% of registered voters supported same-sex marriage, 20% favored civil unions, 6.7% of voters were unsure, and only 18.4% opposed both marriage and civil unions for same-sex couples, meaning 74.9% supported legal recognition of some kind. This was based on a survey of 1,000 registered voters in Illinois and had a margin of error of plus or minus three percentage points. The poll was taken approximately 15 months after the same-sex marriage bill was signed by then-Governor Quinn, nine months after marriage was legal for same-sex couples (statewide), and four months before the Supreme Court nationalized marriage for same-sex couples under the 14th Amendment of the Constitution.

A 2017 Public Religion Research Institute (PRRI) opinion poll found that 65% of Illinois residents supported same-sex marriage, while 25% opposed it and 10% were unsure. The same poll found that 71% of Illinois residents supported an anti-discrimination law covering sexual orientation and gender identity, while 21% were opposed. Furthermore, 59% were against allowing public businesses to refuse to serve LGBTQ people due to religious beliefs, while 33% supported allowing such religiously-based refusals.

A 2022 Public Religion Research Institute poll found that 77% of Illinois residents supported same-sex marriage, while 20% opposed it and 2% were unsure. The same poll found that 85% of Illinois residents supported an anti-discrimination law covering sexual orientation and gender identity, while 12% were opposed and 3% were unsure.

Public opinion for LGBT anti-discrimination laws in Illinois
Poll source	Date(s) administered	Sample size	Margin of error	% support	% opposition	% no opinion
Public Religion Research Institute	January 2-December 30, 2019	1,635	?	74%	21%	5%
Public Religion Research Institute	January 3-December 30, 2018	1,723	?	69%	24%	7%
Public Religion Research Institute	April 5-December 23, 2017	2,452	?	71%	21%	8%
Public Religion Research Institute	April 29, 2015-January 7, 2016	2,936	?	75%	21%	4%

== Summary table ==
Same-sex sexual activity legal with an equal age of consent	Yes (Since 1962; the first in the United States)
Ban on book bans law implemented	Yes (Since 2024; the first in the United States)
Anti-discrimination laws for sexual orientation and gender identity	Yes (Since 2006)
Same-sex marriage	Yes (Since 2014)
Recognition of same-sex couples (e.g. civil union)	Yes (Since 2011)
Joint and stepchild adoption by same-sex couples	Yes
Lesbian, gay and bisexual people allowed to serve openly in the military	Yes (Since 2011)
Transgender people allowed to serve openly in the military	(Since 2025, both under an executive order and a ruling by the Supreme Court of the United States)
Intersex people allowed to serve openly in the military	(Current DoD policy bans "hermaphrodites" from serving or enlisting in the military)
Right to change legal gender	Yes
Third gender option	Yes / Yes (Since 2020 for birth certificates, and since 2024 for driver's licenses)
Conversion therapy banned on minors	Yes (Since 2016)
Gay and trans panic defense abolished	Yes (Since 2018)
LGBT anti-bullying law in schools and colleges	Yes
LGBT-inclusive history education required to be taught in schools	Yes (Since 2020)
Access to gender-neutral restrooms	Yes (Mandated for single-occupancy restrooms since 2019)
Access to IVF for lesbian couples	Yes
Surrogacy arrangements legal for gay male couples	Yes
MSMs allowed to donate blood	Yes (Since 2023, under the condition of “being monogamous”)

== See also ==
- Chicago Pride Parade
- Law of Illinois
- Equality Illinois
