= Saycon Sengbloh =

American actress and singer

- Born: October 23, 1977 (age 48); Atlanta, Georgia, U.S.
- Education: Agnes Scott College
- Occupations: Actress, singer
- Years active: 1997–present
- Website: https://sayconsengbloh.com/

Saycon Sengbloh (born October 23, 1977) is an American actress and singer. She was nominated for a Tony Award for Best Featured Actress in a Play and won a Drama Desk Award for Outstanding Featured Actress in a Play and an Obie Award for Outstanding Performance for her role in Danai Gurira's play Eclipsed in 2016.

== Life and career ==
Sengbloh was born in Atlanta, Georgia. She first began acting at Tri-Cities School for the Visual and Performing Arts. Sengbloh then attended Agnes Scott College in Decatur, Georgia, where she studied music and Spanish before leaving to pursue a career in acting and music.

=== Stage ===
Sengbloh has starred in a number of Broadway musicals, including Aida, Wicked (as a standby for Elphaba), The Color Purple, Hair, Fela!, Motown: The Musical, and Holler If Ya Hear Me. Her breakthrough came in 2015, when Danai Gurira cast Sengbloh in Eclipsed, a play about five Liberian women and their tale of survival near the end of the Second Liberian Civil War. It became the first play with an all-black and female creative cast and team to premiere on Broadway. Eclipsed opened Off-Broadway at The Public Theater in October 2015 with positive reviews and ran until November 2015. The following year, it transferred to Broadway, premiering at the John Golden Theatre with an opening on March 6, 2016. Her performance received positive reviews from critics. She won Drama Desk Award for Outstanding Featured Actress in a Play for original Off-Broadway production, and Tony Award for Best Featured Actress in a Play nomination for Broadway production.

=== Television and film ===
Sengbloh made her screen debut playing opposite Kimberly Elise in the 1997 television film The Ditchdigger's Daughters. In 1999, she made her big screen debut appearing in the independent drama film Funny Valentines starring Alfre Woodard. She later played small parts in films Across the Universe and American Gangster. She also made guest appearances on television series including Law & Order and The Good Wife.

In 2017, Sengbloh was cast in a recurring role as Angela Webster for the sixth season of Shonda Rhimes' political drama Scandal. She played the role of Roberta in the 2018 historical drama film Ask for Jane. In 2021, she starred opposite Jennifer Hudson in the biographical drama film Respect playing Erma Franklin, the elder sister of Aretha Franklin. In 2021, it was announced that she would play lead role Lillian Williams in the reboot of the TV series, The Wonder Years.

=== Miscellaneous ===
In 2019, Sengbloh launched a personal lifestyle podcast called SayconTalks.

== Filmography ==
=== Film ===
Year	Title	Role	Notes
1997	The Ditchdigger's Daughters	Kimberly	TV movie
1998	Kismet	Sasha	Short
1999	Funny Valentines	Young Dearie B.	
2007	Across the Universe	Sadie's Singer	
2007	American Gangster	Tango's Woman	
2008	44	Sophie	Short
2012	Love & Squalor	Carly	Short
2017	Double Play	Nora	
2018	Ask for Jane	Roberta	
2020	A Shot Through The Wall	Community Organizer	
2021	Respect	Erma Franklin	
2025	Love, Brooklyn	Beth	
2025	Vera's Holiday Flop	Rhonda	

=== Television ===
Year	Title	Role	Notes
1999	Dawson's Creek	Conspiracy Theorist	Episode: "Escape from Witch Island"
2008	Law & Order	Nurse Jamie Peltzer	Episode: "Falling"
2014	The Good Wife	Stacie Wagner	Episode: "Dear God"
2016	The Night Of	Tombs Officer	Episode: "Subtle Beast"
2017	Scandal	Angela Webster	Recurring Cast: Season 6
2017	Ten Days in the Valley	Diane	Episode: "Day 7" & "Day 8"
2019	The Passage	Jeanette Bellafonte	Episode: "You Are Like the Sun"
2019-20	In the Dark	Jules Becker	Recurring Cast: Season 1, Guest: Season 2
2021	Delilah	Leah Dorsey	Recurring Cast
2021-23	The Wonder Years	Lillian Williams	Main Cast

== Awards and nominations ==
Year	Award	Category	Work	Result
2016	Tony Awards	Best Featured Actress in a Play	Eclipsed	Nominated
2016	Outer Critics Circle Awards	Best Featured Actress in a Play	Eclipsed	Nominated
2016	Drama Desk Awards	Outstanding Featured Actress in a Play	Eclipsed	Won
2020	Drama Desk Awards	Outstanding Actress in a Musical	The Secret Life of Bees	Nominated
