= Ask for Jane =

- Film poster
- Directed by: Rachel Carey
- Screenplay by: Rachel Carey
- Based on: Jane Collective
- Produced by: Cait Cortelyou; Josh Folan; Caroline Hirsch
- Starring: Cait Cortelyou; Cody Horn; Sarah Ramos; Sarah Steele; Sophie von Haselberg
- Cinematography: Caitlin Machak
- Edited by: Ulysses Guidotti
- Music by: Daisy Coole; Tom Nettleship
- Production companies: Caroline's Entertainment; NYEH Entertainment; Raptor Films
- Release date: 2018
- Country: United States
- Language: English

Ask for Jane is a 2018 American historical drama film created and produced by Cait Cortelyou, and written and directed by Rachel Carey. The film stars Cait Cortelyou, Cody Horn, Sarah Ramos, Sarah Steele and Sophie von Haselberg.

The film is based on the true story about the Jane Collective, an underground abortion network which was active in Chicago between 1969 and 1973. The Jane Collective helped over 11,000 women obtain illegal abortions before Roe v. Wade was passed. Ask for Jane is the first ever narrative feature film about the Jane Collective.

== Plot ==
In 1973, a group of women are arrested for being involved in an underground abortion network in Chicago. They flashback to four years before.

Patty drops out of school and runs away from home because she is pregnant. Rose successfully convinces Patty to get an abortion, which was illegal at the time.

Donna attempts to become a sex education teacher to replace sister Anne Marie. However, principal Rafferty denies Donna's request, citing the fact that there had been no complaints in the past 40 years she had been working there. Donna sneaks a book about birth control into the library.

Barb reveals her pregnancy, and suggests marrying Tim. Tim suggests an abortion, but decides to marry her instead.

Rose, Patty, and Janice graduate college. Rose and Janice decide to create the Women's Liberation Meeting (also known as the Jane Collective), which becomes very popular. The members of the meeting began searching for abortion doctors and directing pregnant women to them. Janice receives a call which threatens to report the group to the police. Rose breaks up with her fiancée, Bill. Donna is fired from her job after a student reports her. The group of women organize a protest for abortion rights. A police officer asks the group to lie low, and decides not to arrest anybody.

The group learns that Dr. Charlie lied about his medical license and pretended to be a doctor. They realize that Charlie had experience in abortions, and decided to keep him. Charlie teaches Janice how to perform an abortion. Soon after, many of the women also learn how to perform abortions.

The entire group is arrested but they are released on bond shortly afterwards. They gain national attention. Their trials begin. However, they are acquitted and their charges are dismissed due to the Supreme court case Roe v. Wade.

== Cast ==
- Cait Cortelyou – Rose
- Judith Arcana – Professor Solomon
- Cody Horn – Janice
- Alison Wright – Ada
- Sarah Ramos – Maggie
- Chloe Levine – Barb
- Daniel Flaherty – Tim
- Sarah Steele – Donna
- Lilly Englert – Patty
- Ben Rappaport – Bill
- Sophie von Haselberg – Joyce
- Phil Burke – Gary
- Saycon Sengbloh – Roberta
- Brian Tarantina – Angry Doctor
- Michael Rabe – Dr. Charlie
- David Fierro – Dr. Fredrickson

== Production and release ==
The film is produced by Caroline's Entertainment's Caroline Hirsch and NYEH's Entertainment Josh Folan. The film received a production grant from Awesome Without Borders. In 2016, the limited series Ask For Jane was one of three finalists in the New York Television Festival Works 4 Progress Initiative.

Judith Arcana, a writer, activist, and real-life member of the Jane Collective is a consulting producer on the film, in addition to making a cameo appearance.
