= Abortion in Illinois =

Abortion in Illinois is legal throughout pregnancy, but restricted post-viability to cases where it is necessary for the life or health of the patient. Laws about abortion dated to the early 1800s in Illinois; the first criminal penalties related to abortion were imposed in 1827, and abortion itself became illegal in 1867. As hospitals set up barriers in the 1950s, the number of therapeutic abortions declined. Following Roe v. Wade in 1973, Illinois passed a number of restrictions on abortion, many of which have subsequently been repealed. Illinois updated its existing abortion laws in June 2019. The state has seen a decline in the number of abortion clinics over the years, going from 58 in 1982 to 47 in 1992 to 24 in 2014, but an increase in abortions.

A 2014 poll of people in Illinois in 2014 found 56% believed that abortion should be legal in all or most cases. That same year, 38,472 abortion procedures took place in the state, 8.2% by out of state residents. Publicly funded abortions for poor women came from a mix of state and federal resources. All state statutes placing some restrictions on abortion were later repealed in June 2019. The 2023 American Values Atlas reported that, in their most recent survey, 68% of Illinoisans said that abortion should be legal in all or most cases.

== History ==
An 1827 Illinois law prohibited the sale of drugs that could induce abortions. The law classed these medications as a "poison". The 1827 law was the first in the nation to impose criminal penalties in connection with abortion before quickening.

Illinois passed a bill in 1867 that made abortion and attempted abortion a criminal offense. Around 1870, Illinois passed another law banning the sale of drugs that could cause induced abortions. The law is notable because it allowed an exception for "the written prescription of some well-known and respectable practicing physician".

The Chicago Times published an undercover exposé on abortion in the city in 1888. One reporter managed to get a referral for an abortion with the head of the Chicago Medical Society.

In 1956, Mt. Sinai Hospital in Chicago created an anonymous committee to approve all requests for therapeutic abortions. As a result, the number of therapeutic abortions in 1957 was 3, down from 15 the previous year.

The Jane Collective, an underground collective that assisted women in obtaining safe abortions, was founded in Chicago in 1969. The collective trained its members in abortion care and provided more than 11,000 abortions before disbanding in 1973.

The US Supreme Court's 1973 decision in Roe v. Wade meant the state could no longer regulate abortion before the viability of the fetus. In 1975, the 79th General Assembly enacted the Illinois Abortion Law, which included a trigger law that provided that if Roe v. Wade was overturned or repealed, "the former policy of this State to prohibit abortions unless necessary for the preservation of the mother's life shall be reinstated."

In 1995, the 89th General Assembly enacted the Parental Notice of Abortion Act, a parental notification law. The Act required physicians to give 48 hours' notice to the parent, grandparent or guardian of a minor seeking an abortion. However, the law was enjoined by the courts for more than two decades.

A 2013 Guttmacher Institute survey found that Illinois' Targeted Regulation of Abortion Providers (TRAP) law applied to private doctor offices, in addition to abortion clinics. As of 2013, Illinois began allowing qualified non-physicians to prescribe drugs for medication abortions only.

In 2013, the Illinois Supreme Court recognized a right to abortion in the Illinois state constitution under the due process clause.

In 2017, the 100th General Assembly repealed the trigger law component of the Illinois Abortion Law of 1975, but left many of its other provisions intact. In the same act, the General Assembly provided for abortion to be covered under Medicaid and state employee health insurance. The bill was signed into law by pro-choice Republican governor Bruce Rauner.

Until June 12, 2019, under the Illinois Abortion Law of 1975, state law banned abortions after 12 weeks. The state prohibited abortions after the fetus was viable, generally some point between week 24 and 28, based on the standard defined by the US Supreme Court in 1973 with the Roe v. Wade ruling, not because of legislative action.

State legislators had introduced a bill in February 2019 to make abortion a right and to remove the 12-week ban from the books. In May 2019 the bill's sponsors demanded action to move this bill ahead, after Alabama and Georgia's state governments passed laws all but restricting abortions. On May 31, 2019, Illinois became the eleventh state to pass bills protecting abortion rights in the state in response to anti-abortion legislation being passed elsewhere. The bills, pushed through by the Democratic-controlled House and Senate and known as the Illinois Reproductive Health Act, provided statutory protections for abortions, and rescinded previous legislation that banned some late-term abortions and a 45-year-old law that had made performing such abortions a criminal offense. After the bill passed, Governor Pritzker was on the Illinois Senate floor, hugging and congratulating abortion-rights supporters. The Illinois Reproductive Health Act says that women have the "fundamental right" to access abortion services, and that a "fertilized egg, embryo, or fetus does not have independent rights". Pritzker signed the bill into law on June 12, 2019.

In fall 2021, the General Assembly passed a bill to repeal the Parental Notice of Abortion Act. Governor Pritzker signed it into law on December 17, 2021. Thus, as of June 1, 2022, Illinois does not require a minor to notify a parent or guardian in order to obtain an abortion.

The Supreme Court overturned Roe v. Wade in Dobbs v. Jackson Women's Health Organization, No. 19-1392, 597 U.S. ___ (2022) later in 2022.

Following the overturn of Roe v. Wade, Illinois became an abortion access state for people in the South and Midwest impacted by abortion bans in their states, with 30% of abortions going to out of state residents. Abortions in Illinois increased by over 45% in the year following the overturn of Roe v. Wade, primarily due to patients traveling from states with abortion bans. By 2023, Illinois saw more out-of-state abortions than any other state, a 71% increase from 2020 to 2023. As of 2025, nearly 1 in 4 people nationally who crossed state lines to obtain abortions went to Illinois for the procedure, a volume higher than any state in the country.

In 2023, Illinois passed House Bill 4664, protecting access to abortion in the state. It was signed into law by Governor Pritzker on January 13, 2023.

In 2025, Governor Pritzker signed two abortion rights bills passed by the Illinois General Assembly into law; Illinois House Bill 3637, which stipulates that any medication that had U.S. Food and Drug Administration approval prior to 2025 and remains approved by the World Health Organization will remain legally accessible in Illinois even if the FDA revokes approval of the drug, effective until 2034. He also signed Illinois House Bill 3709, which requires Illinois colleges and universities to provide students access to contraception and abortion medications at campus pharmacies and health care centers.

On June 24, 2026, the fourth anniversary of the overturning of Roe v. Wade, Governor Pritzker signed the Reproductive Health Records Privacy Act into law, which prevents abortion information from being shared with out-of-state entities, shielding it so abortion-seekers are protected from potential retaliation for receiving legal healthcare in Illinois.

=== Clinic history ===
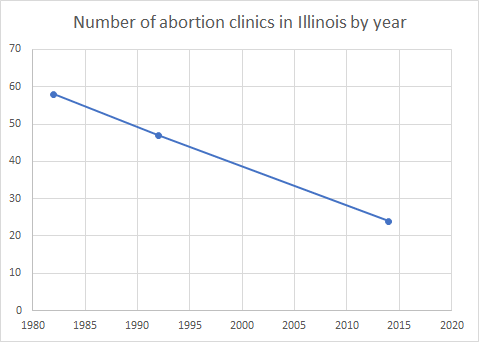
Number of abortion clinics in Illinois by year

Between 1982 and 1992, the number of abortion clinics in the state decreased by 11, going from 58 in 1982 to 47 in 1992. In 2014, there were 24 abortion clinics in the state. 92% of the counties in the state did not have an abortion clinic. That year, 40% of women in the state aged 15–44 lived in a county without an abortion clinic. In 2017, there were 17 Planned Parenthood clinics, 11 of which offered abortion services in a state with a population of 3,003,374 women aged 15–49. Following the announcement in late-May 2019 that the last remaining abortion clinic in the state of Missouri would likely close because it was unable to meet new state licensing rules, abortion clinics in Illinois prepared for an influx of new patients by hiring additional staff and increasing their opening hours. Hope Clinic in Granite City was one of the clinics most likely to be impacted because of its location relative to St. Louis, Missouri.

== Statistics ==
In the period between 1972 and 1974, the state had an illegal abortion mortality rate per million women aged 15–44 of between 0.1 and 0.9. In 1990, 1,402,000 women in the state faced the risk of an unintended pregnancy. In 2014, 56% of adults said in a poll by the Pew Research Center that abortion should be legal vs. 41% that believe it should be illegal in all or most cases. In 2017, the state had an infant mortality rate of 6.1 deaths per 1,000 live births.

Number of reported abortions, abortion rate and percentage change in rate by geographic region and state in 1992, 1995 and 1996
| Census division and state | Number | | | Rate | | | % change 1992–1996 |
|---|---|---|---|---|---|---|---|
| Census division and state | 1992 | 1995 | 1996 | 1992 | 1995 | 1996 | % change 1992–1996 |
| East North Central | 204,810 | 185,800 | 190,050 | 20.7 | 18.9 | 19.3 | –7 |
| Illinois | 68,420 | 68,160 | 69,390 | 25.4 | 25.6 | 26.1 | 3 |
| Indiana | 15,840 | 14,030 | 14,850 | 12 | 10.6 | 11.2 | –7 |
| Michigan | 55,580 | 49,370 | 48,780 | 25.2 | 22.6 | 22.3 | –11 |
| Ohio | 49,520 | 40,940 | 42,870 | 19.5 | 16.2 | 17 | –13 |
| Wisconsin | 15,450 | 13,300 | 14,160 | 13.6 | 11.6 | 12.3 | –9 |

Number, rate, and ratio of reported abortions, by reporting area of residence and occurrence and by percentage of abortions obtained by out-of-state residents, US CDC estimates
| Location | Residence | | | Occurrence | | | % obtained by out-of-state residents | Year | Ref |
|---|---|---|---|---|---|---|---|---|---|
| Location | No. | Rate^ | Ratio^^ | No. | Rate^ | Ratio^^ | % obtained by out-of-state residents | Year | Ref |
| Illinois | | | | 68,420 | 25.4 | | | 1992 | |
| Illinois | | | | 68,160 | 25.6 | | | 1995 | |
| Illinois | | | | 69,390 | 26.1 | | | 1996 | |
| Illinois | 33,918 | 13.1 | 214 | 38,472 | 14.8 | 243 | 8.2 | 2014 | |
| Illinois | 35,237 | 13.7 | 223 | 39,856 | 15.5 | 252 | 8.5 | 2015 | |
| Illinois | 33,311 | 13.1 | 216 | 38,382 | 15.1 | 249 | 12.2 | 2016 | |
^number of abortions per 1,000 women aged 15–44; ^^number of abortions per 1,000 live births

== Abortion financing ==
State Medicaid coverage of medically necessary abortion services. Medicaid covers medically necessary abortion for low-income women through legislation Medicaid covers medically necessary abortions for low-income women under court order Medicaid denies abortion coverage for low-income women except for cases of rape, incest, or life endangerment.

Seventeen states including Illinois used their own funds to cover all or most "medically necessary" abortions sought by low-income women under Medicaid, thirteen of which are required by State court orders to do so. In 2010, the state had 371 publicly funded abortions, of which were 237 federally and 134 were state funded.

== Criminal prosecution ==
Between 1974 and May 2019, there was a law that said that anyone who performed a late term abortion could be charged criminally with that offense. No one was ever charged with violating that law.

== Abortion rights activism ==
=== Organizations ===
The Jane Collective, which began as the Abortion Counseling Service of the Chicago Women's Liberation Union, was established by Chicago-area feminists as a way to try to provide local women with safe and affordable illegal abortions during the late 1960s and early 1970s. According to Laura Kaplan who wrote a history of the group, members assisted women in having 11,000 safe abortions. Another estimate put the total abortions assisted by the group as 12,000 between 1969 and 1973.

The Chicago Abortion Fund was established in 1985, which assists low-income people in obtaining abortions. In 1994, Mary Morten became board chair and recruited Toni Bond as CEO. Both women were African American, which at the time was unique among the leadership of pro-choice organizations in Illinois.

=== Activities ===
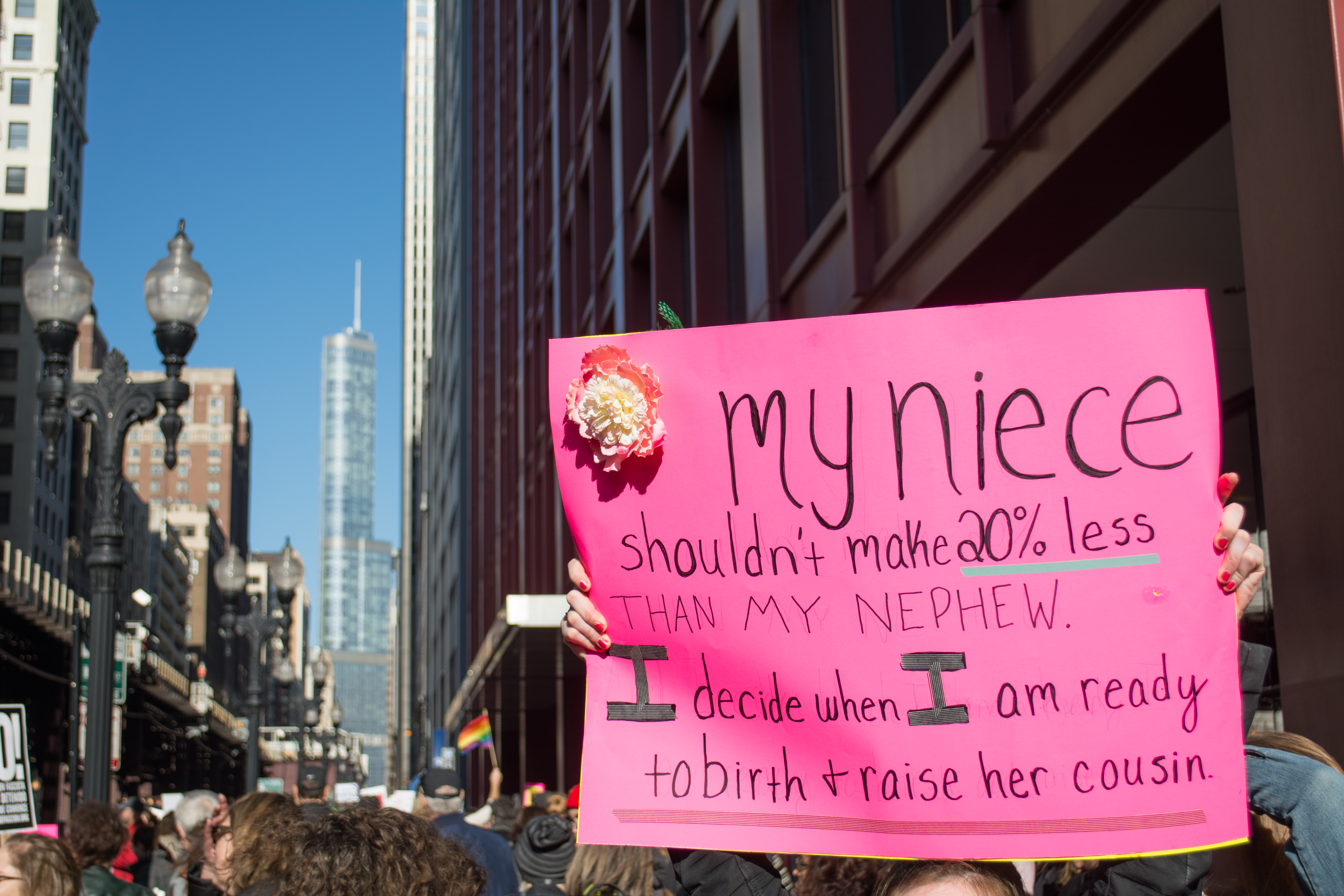
2017 Chicago Women's March

Webster v. Reproductive Health Services was before the US Supreme Court in 1989. The Court ruled in a case over a Missouri law that banned abortions being performed in public buildings unless there was a need to save the life of the mother, required physicians to determine if a fetus was past 20 weeks and was viable in addition to other restrictions on a woman's ability to get an abortion. The US Supreme Court largely ruled in favor of the law, but made clear that this was not an overruling of Roe v. Wade. As a response to this Supreme Court decision, the radical feminist art collective Sister Serpents was formed in Chicago to empower women and to increase awareness of women's issues through radical art.

=== Protests ===
Women from the state participated in marches supporting abortion rights as part of a #StoptheBans movement in May 2019. Many women in Chicago wore red, referencing women in Margaret Atwood's The Handmaid's Tale.

Following the leak of the overturn of Roe v. Wade on May 2, 2022, Illinois saw protests in Bloomington, Chicago, Peoria, Rockford, and Springfield. On May 7, more than 1,000 abortion-rights protesters met and marched in downtown Chicago. Governor J. B. Pritzker and Lieutenant Governor Juliana Stratton spoke to the crowd in Federal Plaza. On May 14, thousands of abortion rights protesters, and a group of anti-abortion activists, met and marched in Union Park and Beverly in Chicago. On May 20, a majority of students at Lake Forest High School in Lake Forest walked out in protest of the leaked draft Supreme Court decision.

Following the overturn of Roe v. Wade on June 24, 2022, Illinois saw a protest in Chicago on June 24 with ABC 7 News counting thousands marching to Grant Park, and a few dozen anti-abortion activists in Federal Plaza. Among those in attendance included Governor J. B. Pritzker. Additional protests and marches were held in downtown Chicago the following day. Another protest was held in downtown Naperville; ABC 7 News counted several hundred protesters. On June 26, a group of abortion rights protesters disrupted a Catholic Mass in Old Town, Chicago. On July 9, hundreds of abortion rights protesters and anti-abortion protesters clashed in Chicago's Federal Plaza and marched downtown.

In Chicago on April 9, 2023, Easter Sunday, a group of abortion rights protesters dressed as handmaids protested outside of Holy Name Cathedral, Chicago. On June 24, 2023, the one year anniversary of the overturning of Roe v. Wade, an abortion rights protest was held in Chicago outside of Federal Plaza. In Chicago on July 15 and September 28, 2023, dozens of abortion rights protesters rallied against "crisis pregnancy centers". In Evanston, Illinois on October 15, 2023, an abortion rights protest and march was held. In McHenry, Illinois on October 28, 2023, a group of abortion rights protesters rallied against "crisis pregnancy centers".

In Chicago on March 26, 2024, a group of abortion rights protesters rallied outside the federal courthouse downtown in support of preserving access to mifepristone. In Chicago on August 18, 2024, hundreds of protesters rallied and marched for abortion rights, LGBTQ rights, and a ceasefire to the Gaza war outside of the Democratic National Convention. In Chicago on September 26, 2024, a group of abortion rights protesters rallied outside of an anti-abortion banquet benefiting "crisis pregnancy centers". In Chicago on November 6, 2024, hundreds attended an anti-Trump rally.

Hundreds of people attended anti-Trump rallies in Chicago on January 20 and 25, 2025. The 50501 Movement held anti-Trump administration protests in Chicago and Springfield, Illinois on February 5 and 17, 2025.

On February 28, 2025, an abortion rights protest was held in Pecatonica, Illinois to oppose Representative Tony McCombie's reintroduction of a bill that would repeal the Reproductive Health Act and ban abortion in Illinois.

== Anti-abortion activities and views ==
=== Organizations ===
Illinois Family Institute (IFI), a Christian non-profit organization opposed to abortion, separation of church and state, "activist judges", the "marriage penalty", civil unions, same-sex marriage, gambling and drug legalization based in Illinois.

In 1967, Phyllis Schlafly launched the Eagle Trust Fund in Chicago, Illinois, for receiving donations related to conservative causes. The Eagle Forum was pegged by Schlafly as "the alternative to women's lib". It is opposed to a number of feminist issues, which founder Phyllis Schlafly claimed were "extremely destructive" and "poisoned the attitudes of many young women". The organization believes only in a family consisting of a father, mother, and children. They are supportive of women's role as "full-time homemakers", and opposed to same-sex marriage. Eagle Forum opposes abortion, and has defended the push for government defunding of Planned Parenthood.

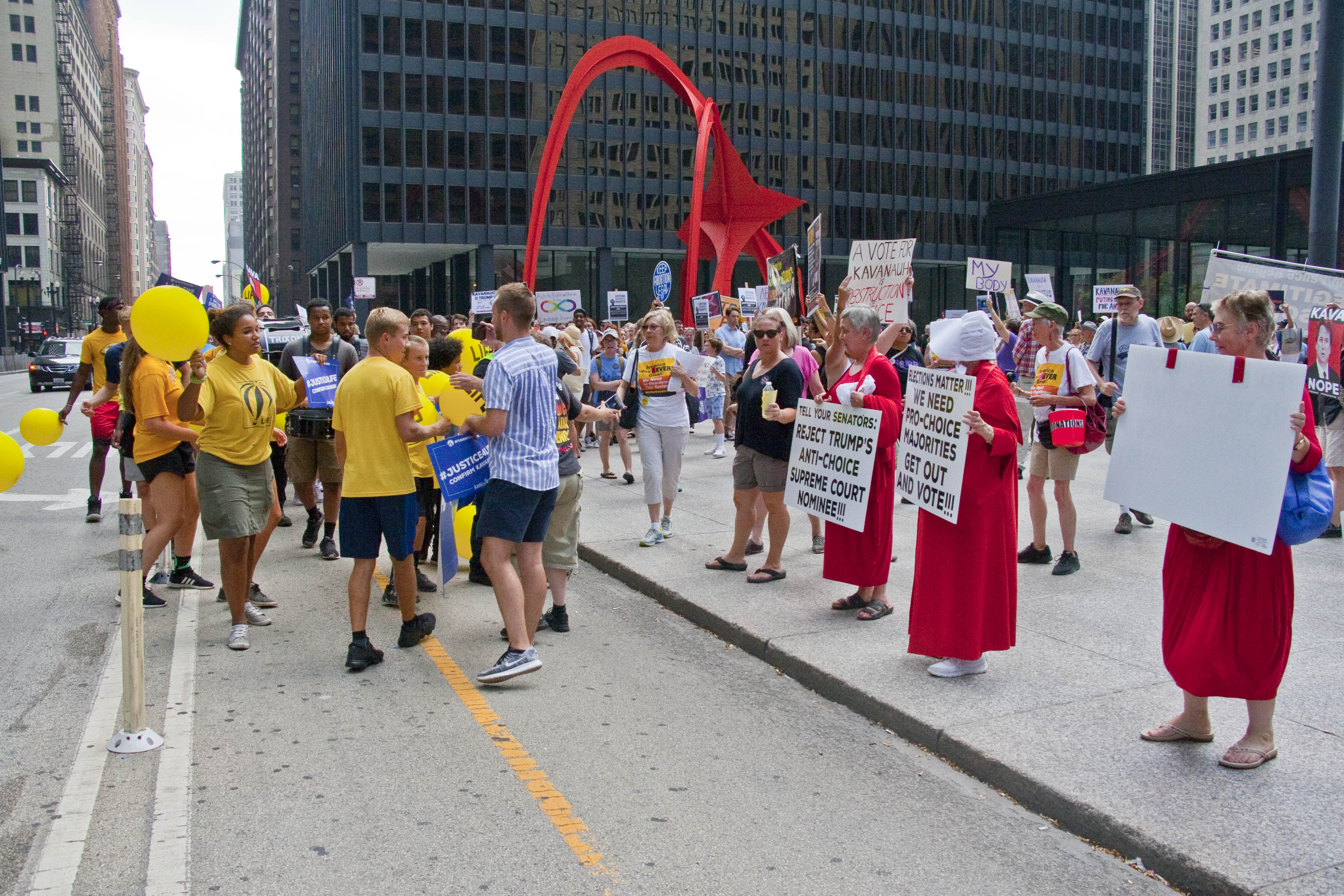
Verbal confrontation between pro-life and pro-choice groups, Stop Brett Kavanaugh Rally, downtown Chicago, Illinois, August 26, 2018

=== Activities ===
After the 1972 proposal of the Equal Rights Amendment (ERA), Schlafly reorganized her efforts to defeat its ratification, founding the group "Stop ERA" and starting the Eagle Forum Newsletter. In 1975, Stop ERA was renamed the Eagle Forum. According to Schlafly, the passage of the ERA could "mean Government-funded abortions, homosexual schoolteachers, women forced into military combat and men refusing to support their wives." The newsletter began to circulate, and many conservative women wrote to their legislators, relaying the concerns voiced by Schlafly in the Eagle Forum Newsletter. Support for The Eagle Forum grew with the support of many conservative women and various church groups, as did the opposition to the ERA. Many of the same women who had helped Schlafly distribute her book were involved with STOP ERA. Less than a year after its creation, STOP ERA had grown to several thousand members.

The Pro-Life Action League became active in Chicago in 1980, and tried to disrupt the ability of women to seek abortions by engaging in a variety of tactics, including "sidewalk counseling", sit-ins, and disrupting the water and sewage supplies to abortion clinics. The group's leader, Joe Scheidler, published a book in 1985, called Closed: 99 Ways to Stop Abortion.

The methods used by Pro-life Action League would later become known as the "Chicago Method", which relied on an approach to sidewalk counseling that involves giving those about to enter an abortion facility copies of lawsuits filed against the facility or its physicians.

=== Activism ===
Beginning in 1983, American Catholic Cardinal Joseph Bernardin argued that abortion, euthanasia, capital punishment, and unjust war are all related, and all wrong. He said that "to be truly 'pro-life,' you have to take all of those issues into account."

=== Donations ===
Following the passage of abortion bans in Alabama, Georgia and Mississippi in early 2019, Pro-Life Action League saw an increase in donations and people asking to volunteer to help the organization.

=== Violence ===
1982 saw a surge in attacks on abortion clinics in the United States with at least four arson attacks and one bombing. One attack occurred in Illinois and one in Virginia. Two occurred in Florida. These five attacks caused over US$1.1 million in damage. In August 1982, three men identifying as the Army of God kidnapped Hector Zevallos (an abortion doctor and abortion clinic owner) and his wife, Rosalee Jean, holding them for eight days.

In Rockford, Illinois on September 30, 2000, John Earl, a Catholic priest, drove his car into the Northern Illinois Health Clinic after learning that the FDA had approved the drug RU-486. He pulled out an ax before being forced to the ground by the owner of the building, who fired two warning shots from a shotgun. He was sentenced to 30 months of probation and paid over $7,000 in fines and restitution, but was not removed from the priesthood.

On August 24, 2022, two anti-abortion protesters vandalized an abortion-rights church in the Lake View, Chicago neighborhood on Chicago's north side.

In Peoria, Illinois on January 15, 2023, an anti-abortion protester threw a fire accelerant at a window of a Planned Parenthood, causing a fire and an estimated $150,000 in damages. On January 22, abortion rights protesters rallied to support the clinic in response to the attack. The anti-abortion protestor was arrested on federal arson-related charges on January 24. He was later sentenced to 10 years in prison.

In Danville, Illinois on May 20, 2023, an anti-abortion protester was arrested and charged with attempted arson after ramming his vehicle filled with containers of gasoline into a prospective abortion clinic, just weeks after hundreds of abortion rights protesters had rallied in opposition to a proposed local ordinance banning abortion pills, which are legal in Illinois per the Reproductive Health Care Act. He was later sentenced to 5 years in prison.
