= Sophie von Haselberg =

American actress (born 1986)

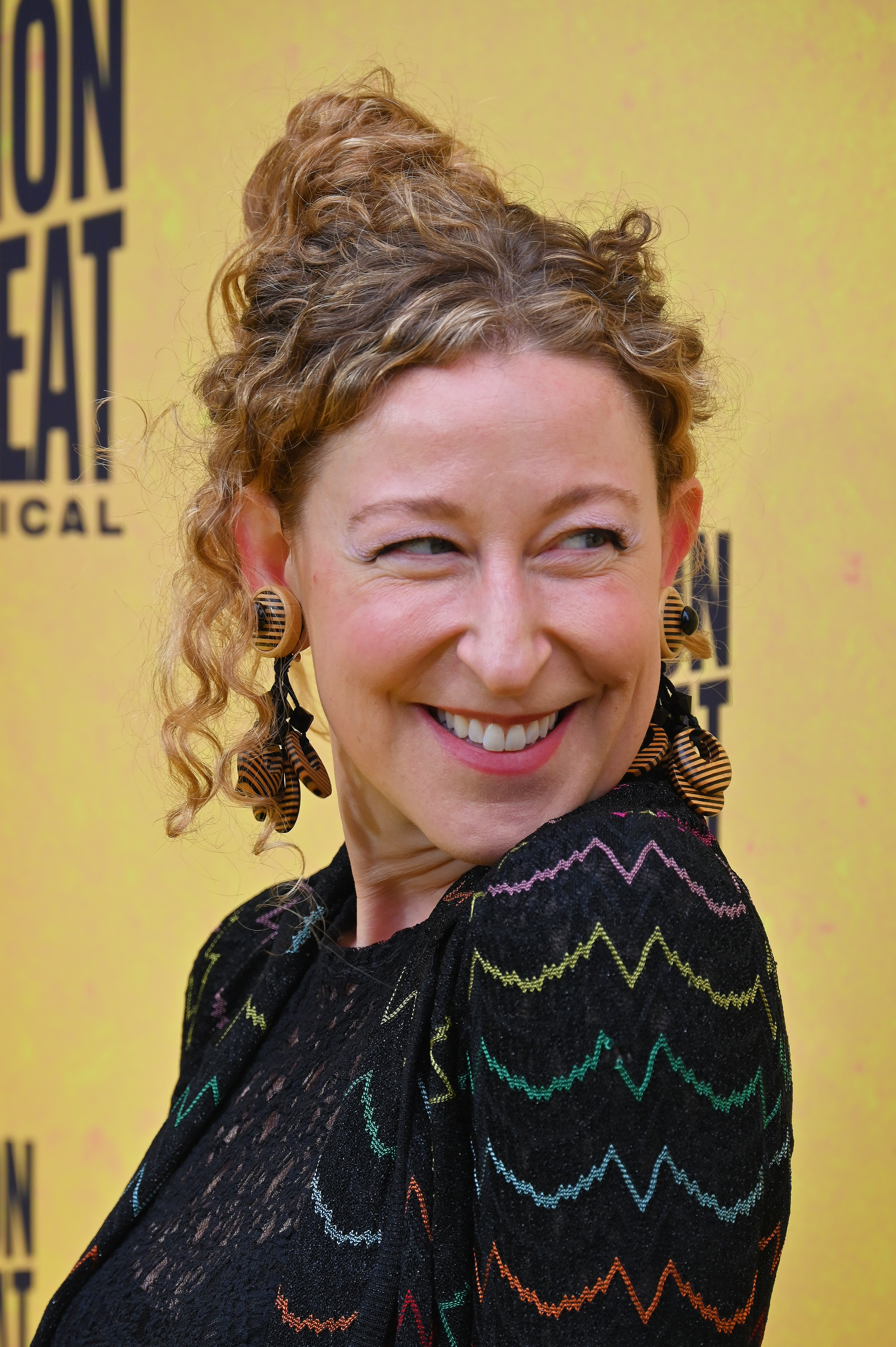
- von Haselberg in 2025
- Born: Sophie Frederica Alohilani von Haselberg; November 14, 1986 (age 40); Los Angeles, California, U.S.
- Education: Yale University, Yale School of Drama
- Occupation: Actress
- Years active: 1991–present
- Spouse: Harry J.N. Guinness (m. 2020)
- Parents: Martin von Haselberg (father); Bette Midler (mother)

Sophie von Haselberg Guinness (born November 14, 1986) is an American actress. She is best known for co-starring in Woody Allen's 2015 film Irrational Man, alongside Joaquin Phoenix and Emma Stone. Other notable roles have been in FX's The Assassination of Gianni Versace (2018) and the Lifetime television series American Princess (2019). She is the daughter of Bette Midler and Martin von Haselberg.

== Early life and education ==
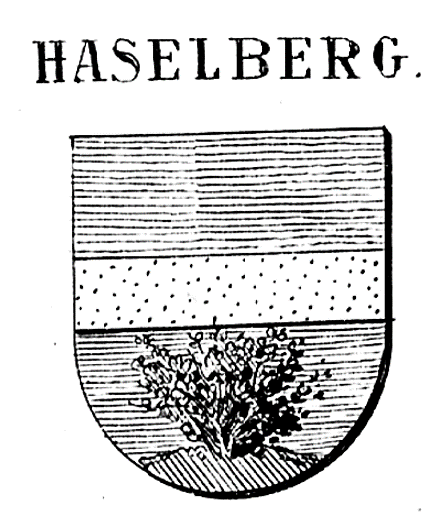
Coat of arms of the Von Haselberg family, formerly part of the German nobility, which ceased to exist as a legal class in 1919

Born Sophie Frederica Alohilani von Haselberg on November 14, 1986 in Los Angeles, California she is the daughter of actress and singer Bette Midler and artist Martin von Haselberg. Her father is of German noble descent and her mother is of Jewish-American descent. She attended the Nightingale-Bamford School in New York City. She then studied at Yale University, and graduated with a B.A. in Sociology and East Asian studies in May 2008. She then returned to Yale in 2011 after time abroad to study acting at the drama school. She graduated with a Master of Fine Arts in 2014.

== Career ==
After graduating college in 2008, von Haselberg worked at an ad agency in China.

In October 2014, von Haselberg made her New York City theater debut at the Vineyard Theatre, in the play Billy and Ray, directed by Garry Marshall (who had directed her mother, Bette Midler in Beaches).

In 2015, von Haselberg received a favorable review for her role in the Woody Allen film Irrational Man, which starred Joaquin Phoenix and Emma Stone. Allen stated,

She's wonderful. She came in with a lot of other women that read and she's the spitting image of her [mother] and she was just good… I thought she was so good that I combined her part. There was another part to[o] and when I gave her the role, then I dropped the other character out of the movie and worked it so that she could have a double role, so [she] could appear more frequently [']cause she was impressive… She projects intelligence because she's intelligent.

Also in 2015, von Haselberg was cast in a pilot for MTV starring Nicole Byer, and in October of the same year, she started shooting The Wizard of Lies for HBO.

In 2017, she filmed the role of Joyce in the historical drama film Ask for Jane, released the following year. In 2018, she played Linda Elwell in FX's The Assassination of Gianni Versace: American Crime Story. She appeared in season 2, episode 1 and the Season Finale of FX's Pose as ACT UP activist Syd.

== Personal life ==
On June 6, 2020, von Haselberg married Harry J.N. Guinness, the youngest son of Timothy Whitmore Newton Guinness, in Millbrook, New York, at the home of her parents.

== Filmography ==
=== Film ===
Year	Name	Role	Comments
1991	Frankie and Johnny		
2015	Irrational Man	April	
2018	Ask for Jane	Joyse	"'Ask for Jane' Full Cast". IMDb.
2022	Give Me Pity!	Sissy St. Claire	
2024	Love... Reconsidered		
2025	By Design	Len	
2025	Fantasy Life	Becky	
2026	Ugly Cry		

=== Television ===
Year	Name	Role	Comments
2019	American Princess	Natasha	TV series, 8 episodes.
2019–2021	Pose	Syd	TV series, 3 episodes.
2021	Halston	Renee	TV series, 1 episode.
2021	Impeachment: American Crime Story	Linda Elwell	TV series, 2 episodes.
2023	American Horror Story: Delicate	Mary I of England	TV series, 1 episode.
2026	Love Story	Tanya	TV series, 2 episodes.
