= Gaylon Alcaraz =

American community organizer and human rights activist

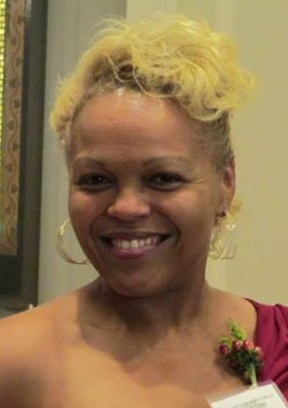
- Born: October 26, 1966 (age 59); Chicago, Illinois, US
- Education: DePaul University
- Occupations: Adjunct faculty at DePaul University; community organizer; activist
- Movement: Reproductive rights, affordable housing, LGBT rights, women's rights, economic justice

Gaylon Alcaraz (born October 26, 1966) is an American community organizer and human rights activist in Chicago, Illinois. She is the former executive director of the Chicago Abortion Fund. Her autobiography, Tales of a Woojiehead, was published by Blackgurl Press in 2002.

== Education ==
Alcaraz earned her undergraduate and graduate degrees from DePaul University. She completed one year of coursework at Roosevelt University towards a Doctorate of Education. She is currently attending National Louis University to earn Ph.D. in community psychology.

== Career ==
In 1997, Alcaraz became a founding board member of Affinity Community Services, an organization dedicated to developing leadership skills for black lesbian and bisexual women. In 2011, she joined the board of directors of the Illinois Caucus for Adolescent Health and the Midwest Access Project. Alcaraz was Executive Director of Chicago Abortion Fund from 2005 - 2014.

== Awards ==
- The Chicago Reader Newspaper - The People Issue - "The Activist" - December 2014
- SisterSong Women of Color Reproductive Justice Collective - Women Warrior - November 2014
- City of Chicago LGBT Hall of Fame - Inductee - 2013
- NYU Wagner Research Center for Leadership in Action - IGNITE Fellowship - Women of Color in the Social Sector - 2013
- National Organization for Women - Women Who Dared - 2012
- Chicago Foundation for Women - Impact Awards - 2010
- Choice USA - Generational Award - 2009
- National Organization for Women (Chicago Suburban Chapter) - Fay Clayton Award - 2008
