= Illinois House Bill 4664 =

2023 Illinois law

Illinois General Assembly
- Territorial extent: Illinois
- Enacted by: Illinois House of Representatives
- Enacted by: Illinois Senate
- Signed by: JB Pritzker
- Signed: January 13, 2023
- Effective: January 13, 2023

Legislative history

Initiating chamber: Illinois House of Representatives
- Introduced: January 20, 2022
- First reading: January 21, 2022
- Second reading: March 2, 2022
- Third reading: March 3, 2022
- Voting summary: 69 voted for; 42 voted against; 5 absent

Revising chamber: Illinois Senate
- Received from the Illinois House of Representatives: March 4, 2022
- First reading: March 16, 2022
- Second reading: April 7, 2022
- Third reading: January 10, 2023
- Voting summary: 41 voted for; 16 voted against; 2 absent

Final stages
- Finally passed both chambers: January 11, 2023

Summary
- Protects providers of and recipients of abortion and gender-affirming care in Illinois from out-of-state law enforcement and requires insurance coverage of such care.
- Status: In force

Illinois House Bill 4664 (HB 4664), also known as the Patient and Provider Protection Act, is a 2023 law in the state of Illinois that protects access to abortion and gender-affirming medical care and prevents the enforcement of out-of-state laws regarding such care. It was signed by Governor JB Pritzker on January 13, 2023 and became law immediately. It is sometimes referred to as a "shield" law due to its protections from out-of-state law enforcement, making Illinois a reproductive and trans refuge state.

== Provisions ==
House Bill 4664 prohibits the enforcement of out-of-state laws regarding gender-affirming medical care and reproductive care in the state of Illinois. It includes privacy protections for both patients and providers of such care. It protects those who seek reproductive care in Illinois even if they themselves live in a different state. Insurance companies are required to cover abortion, gender-affirming care and HIV treatment.

== Reactions ==
=== Support ===
The Human Rights Campaign congratulated Pritzker on the signing of House Bill 4664.

=== Opposition ===
The Catholic Conference of Illinois opposed House Bill 4664, supporting a "sanctuary of life" instead of a destination for abortions.

== See also ==
- Abortion in Illinois
- LGBTQ rights in Illinois
