= Patricia O'Brien (academic) =

American accounting academic

Patricia Colleen O'Brien (born April 9, 1955, New Jersey) is Ernst & Young Professor of Accounting at the University of Waterloo, School of Accounting and Finance. She is married to Joseph L. Badaracco.

O'Brien did her undergraduate studies at Cornell University, graduating in 1977, and earned an MBA in 1979 and Ph.D. in 1985 from the University of Chicago. Before moving to Waterloo, she worked at York University, London Business School, and the University of Michigan Business School. She has also been a visiting professor at Stanford University Graduate School of Business, and at the University of Amsterdam Faculty of Economics and Econometrics.

O'Brien's main research interests are in the field of information in capital markets. This includes preparation and interpretation of financial disclosures, the effects of disclosures on capital markets, and the role of financial analysts as information intermediaries.

She is a co-author of Accounting: The Language of Business (11th ed., Horton, 2005).
