= Chicago Abortion Fund =

American non-profit organization

- Founded: 1985
- Type: 501(c)(3)
- Purpose: Abortion access and wrap-around support
- Headquarters: Chicago, IL
- Region served: Midwestern United States
- Executive Director: Megan Jeyifo
- Revenue: $5,250,000 USD (2023)
- Expenses: $4,830,000 in USD (2023)
- Website: https://chicagoabortionfund.org/

The Chicago Abortion Fund (CAF) is a nonprofit that provides financial assistance to people seeking abortions. It is affiliated with the National Network of Abortion Funds.

In 2019, CAF spent $160,000 to help women to obtain abortions. After the US Supreme Court's decision in Dobbs v. Jackson Women's Health Organization, the organization's spending increased by almost 50 fold, to around $8 million annually. CAF spends an average of $480 for help with the procedure's cost, and $380 on travel assistance per patient.

== History ==

CAF was founded in October 1985 by a coalition of abortion rights activists in response to the decline of federal funding for abortions due to the 1976 Hyde Amendment.

== Activism and outreach ==

In October 1996, Chicago Abortion Fund formed African American Women Evolving (AAWE). This group was later renamed as Black Women For Reproductive Justice (BWRJ).

In March 2008, Chicago Abortion Fund started a public access television show called The A Word featured on television channel CAN-TV 21 and YouTube. The program's hosts discuss reproductive health and answer questions from viewers.

In March 2011, Chicago Abortion Fund released a public statement against a billboard placed on the south side of Chicago by Life Always. Chicago Abortion Fund's former executive director, Gaylon Alcaraz, appeared on NBC Chicago during a community protest against the billboard.

On April 21, 2012, Chicago Abortion Fund hosted its fourth annual bowl-a-thon event. Proceeds from this event supported the Chicago Abortion Fund.

On May 30, 2012, Gaylon Alcaraz appeared on CAN TV21 to discuss women of color in the reproductive rights movement and answer questions from public viewers. This program was available to television viewers as well as viewers on the internet, who viewed the program via livestream.

On January 19, 2013, Chicago Abortion Fund was mentioned on the television program Melissa Harris-Perry.

It also sometimes moves away from simply staking ground that says, 'Part of what we do is provide abortions, abortions are a protected medical procedure that are between her doctor and a woman and that's what we provide here.' You look at things like the Chicago Abortion Fund, and other abortion funds, that not only say that, but say, 'Hey, and if you can't afford it...'

— Melissa Harris-Perry, Melissa Harris-Perry, Jan 19, 2013

On January 22, 2013, Brittany Mostiller and Gaylon Alcaraz were quoted by Ebony magazine. Mostiller is a former grantee of Chicago Abortion Fund and Alcaraz is CAF's executive director. The article was titled "Roe v. Wade at 40: What Keeps Black Women from Going Public with Our Stories?"

In 2015, former deputy director and My Voice, My Choice leadership group member Brittany Mostiller Keith transitioned into her new role as executive director.

In 2024 the Chicago Abortion Fund donated funds to Family Planning Associates in hopes of continuing abortion support in the Chicago area after the overturning of Roe v Wade.

Until July 2024, CAF, inline with the National Abortion Federation, were providing assistance with 50% of the costs of the procedure and related travel expenses, but due to less money in the funds, they reduced the compensation levels to 30%, to enable the funds to last throughout calendar year 2024.

== See also ==
- Abortion in Illinois
