= Denver 2008 Convention Host Committee =

- Official Logo of the Denver 2008 Convention Host Committee
- Type: Non-profit, NGO
- Headquarters: Denver, Colorado

The Denver 2008 Convention Host Committee is a non-profit organization that was responsible for private funding of the 2008 Democratic National Convention in Denver, Colorado, on August 25–28, 2008. In addition to securing sponsors, other obligations included organizing a volunteer base, managing a vendor database, coordinating local events, providing hospitality to delegates and credentialed media, and promoting tourism in Denver, Colorado and the Western United States.

As the fundraising arm of the convention, the Host Committee had four contractual partners: the Democratic National Convention Committee, which was responsible for logistics of convention activities within Pepsi Center; the City and County of Denver, which provided security, traffic management, and operational support; Kroenke Sports, owner of Pepsi Center arena where the convention was held; and its own executive committee.

== Executive committee members ==
The following individuals are listed on the inside cover of the Official 2008 Democratic National Convention Visitors Guide, produced by the Denver Metro Convention & Visitors Bureau.

- The Hon. Elbra Wedgeworth, president of the Denver Host Committee
- John W. Hickenlooper, mayor of the City and County of Denver
- Bill Ritter Jr., governor of the State of Colorado
- United States senator Ken Salazar
- United States representative Diana DeGette
- Steve Farber, attorney-at-law
- Mike Dino, CEO of the Denver Host Committee

== Host committee members ==
The following individuals are listed on page 10 of the Official 2008 Democratic National Convention Visitors Guide, produced by the Denver Metro Convention & Visitors Bureau.

- Jenny Anderson, event director, host committee
- Katherine Archuleta, mayor's office, senior advisor on policy and initiatives
- Christine Berg, volunteer director, host committee
- Christina Beisel, program assistant for greening, City and County of Denver
- Mollie Brundage, development director, host committee
- Parry Burnap, greening director, host committee
- Sue Cobb, communications director, City and County of Denver
- Trini Dominguez, communications assistant, host committee
- Selena Dunham, chief of staff, host committee
- Stephanie Foote, president, 2008 Rocky Mountain Roundtable
- Germani Gonzales, administrative assistant, host committee
- Rachel Gordon, deputy finance director, host committee
- David Kennedy, disability rights coordinator, host committee
- Betsy Kimak, web producer, host committee
- Melissa Koenigsberg, chief financial officer, host committee
- Lindy Eichenbaum Lent, senior advisor to Denver mayor John Hickenlooper, City and County of Denver
- Paul Lhevine, chief operations officer, host committee
- Chris Lopez, communications director, host committee
- Manjiri Mannino, finance assistant, host committee
- Tyler Mounsey, deputy operations director, host committee
- Robin Pack, accountant, host committee
- Jim Polsfut, chairman, 2008 Rocky Mountain Roundtable
- Miranda Reeves, events assistant, host committee
- Steve Sander, marketing director, City and County of Denver
- Janet Schoniger, director of external affairs, host committee
- Maryanne Talbott, graphic designer, host committee
- Brent Tongco, marketing/communications specialist, City and County of Denver
- Latrisha Underhill, operations director, host committee
- Chantal Unfug, deputy city liaison, Democratic National Convention, City and County of Denver
- Tom Wagenlander, deputy volunteer director, host committee
- Sondra Williams, volunteer advisor, host committee

== Economic impact ==
During the convention, more than 50,000 visitors came to Denver, including more than 16,000 members of the media, bloggers, and independent journalists. Early projections estimated an economic impact of $160–$200 million; however a final report released on October 16, 2008, by Denver Mayor John W. Hickenlooper put the official estimate at a $266.1 million regional economic benefit to the Denver metro region, of which $153.9 million occurred directly within the City and County of Denver.

== Convention greening ==
One mission of the 2008 Denver Convention Host Committee was to ensure that the 2008 Democratic National Convention set a new standard for green conventions whereby sustainability and environmental health concerns are factored into the event planning. The Host Committee led this effort by setting green standards for events, completing environmental improvements at city facilities, setting up recycling areas, partnering with local restaurants and venues for healthy options, and encouraging the use of carbon offsets.

== Fundraising targets ==
On October 16, 2008, the Denver 2008 Convention Host Committee announced that it generated just over $55 million in cash contributions and $5.46 million of in-kind support. The balance of the $60.9 million came from interest income and miscellaneous refunds. That surpassed the Host Committee's original $40 million contractual target by more than $20 million. In a 1,400-page Federal Election Commission report, the Host Committee detailed financial and in-kind contributions from more than 700 businesses and individuals. Security-related expenses, not detailed in the report, were covered separately by a $50 million federal grant.

== Volunteers ==
An estimated 15,000 volunteers answered telephone calls, collated mailings, prepared and distributed convention materials, assisted at media and public events, and even collected and sorted trash at waste recovery stations for recycling and composting.

== See also ==
- 2008 Democratic National Convention
- City and County of Denver
- John W. Hickenlooper
