= Elbra Wedgeworth =

Denver politician

- Born: January 23, 1956; Denver, Colorado
- Occupation: City Council Member
- Parent(s): Castella Price and Walter Wedgeworth, Sr.

Elbra Mae Wedgeworth (born 1956) is a civil servant in Denver, Colorado. Wedgeworth is the only person in recent history to hold positions in all three branches of Denver's city government.

== Biography ==
Elbra Mae Wedgeworth was born January 23, 1956, to parents Castella Price and Walter Wedgeworth, Sr. Growing up, she lived in the Curtis Park neighborhood of Denver and graduated Manual High School in 1974. When she was young, Wedgeworth planned to become a social worker.

== Career ==
Wedgeworth received her B.A. in sociology/anthropology from the University of Redlands in 1978.

In 1989, Wedgeworth became City Council Senior Analyst. From 1994 to 1996, she was Clerk and Recorder for the City and County of Denver. She was part of Mayor Wellington Webb's administration as part of the Denver Election Commission.

From 1996-1999, Wedgeworth was Director of Community Relations and Philanthropic Affairs at Denver Health and Hospital Authority. In this role, she reinstated the Board of Directors and launched the Denver Health Foundation.

In 1999, Wedgeworth was elected to the District 8 seat of the Denver City Council. She was City Council President Pro Tempore from July 2001 to July 2002, and served as Denver City Council President from July 2003 to July 2005. She is the second African American to serve as City Council President.

In 2007, Wedgeworth resigned from City Council and became the Chief Government and Community Relations Office for Denver Health. In this role, she was the liaison to governmental legislative matters and the Community Engagement Initiatives. She was instrumental in a $1 billion bond in 2017 that funds the hospital's new outpatient medical center.

Wedgeworth oversaw the reopening of Union Station as the Chair of the Union Station Redevelopment Project. She was the first African American woman to chair the Downtown Denver Partnership.

Wedgeworth was President and Chair of the Board for the Denver 2008 Convention Host Committee as part of the Democratic National Convention. She is the first African American person to head a national convention host committee.

Wedgeworth retired on December 31, 2019, from her position at Denver Health and Hospital Authority.

In 2020, Wedgeworth joined Denver Public Schools as a senior adviser. Her role was to support schools and coordinate a multi-agency partnership that works with communities dealing with youth violence.

She is part of the Board of Trustees for University of the Redlands.

== Recognition ==
- 2001 - Denver Business Journal Outstanding Women in Business
- 2006 - Martin Luther King Jr Humanitarian Award
- 2013 - Colorado Women's Chamber of Commerce ATHENA Award
- 2014 - Blacks in Colorado Hall of Fame
- 2015 - Legacy Award from Denver Business Journal
- 2018 - City Year Honoree and Ripples of Hope Recipient from Denver Health
- 2021 - David J. Cole Denver Public Safety Citizens Award

In August 2014, in recognition of her service to Denver, the Elbra M. Wedgeworth Municipal Building was named for her in Denver's Five Points neighborhood.
