= 2008 Democratic National Convention =

U.S. political event held in Denver, Colorado

- 2008 presidential election

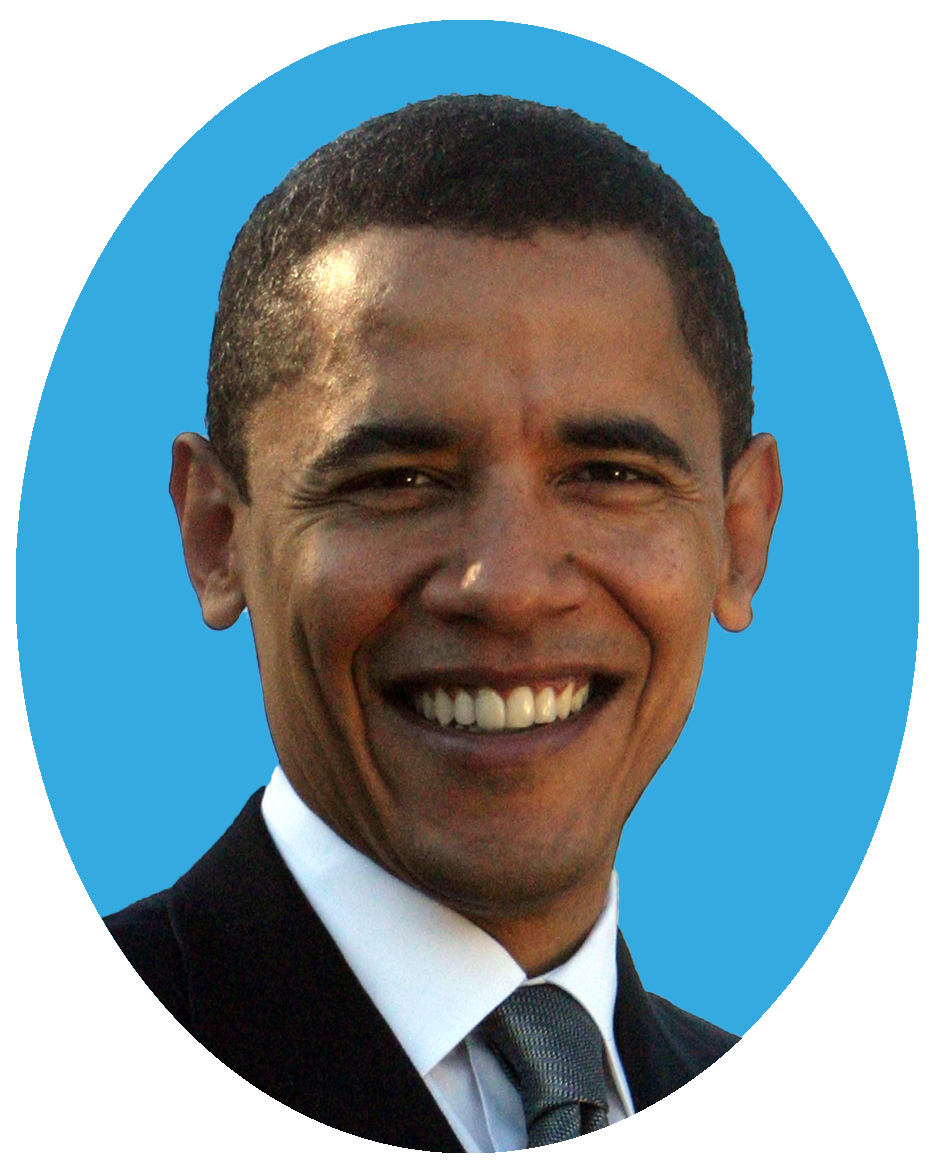
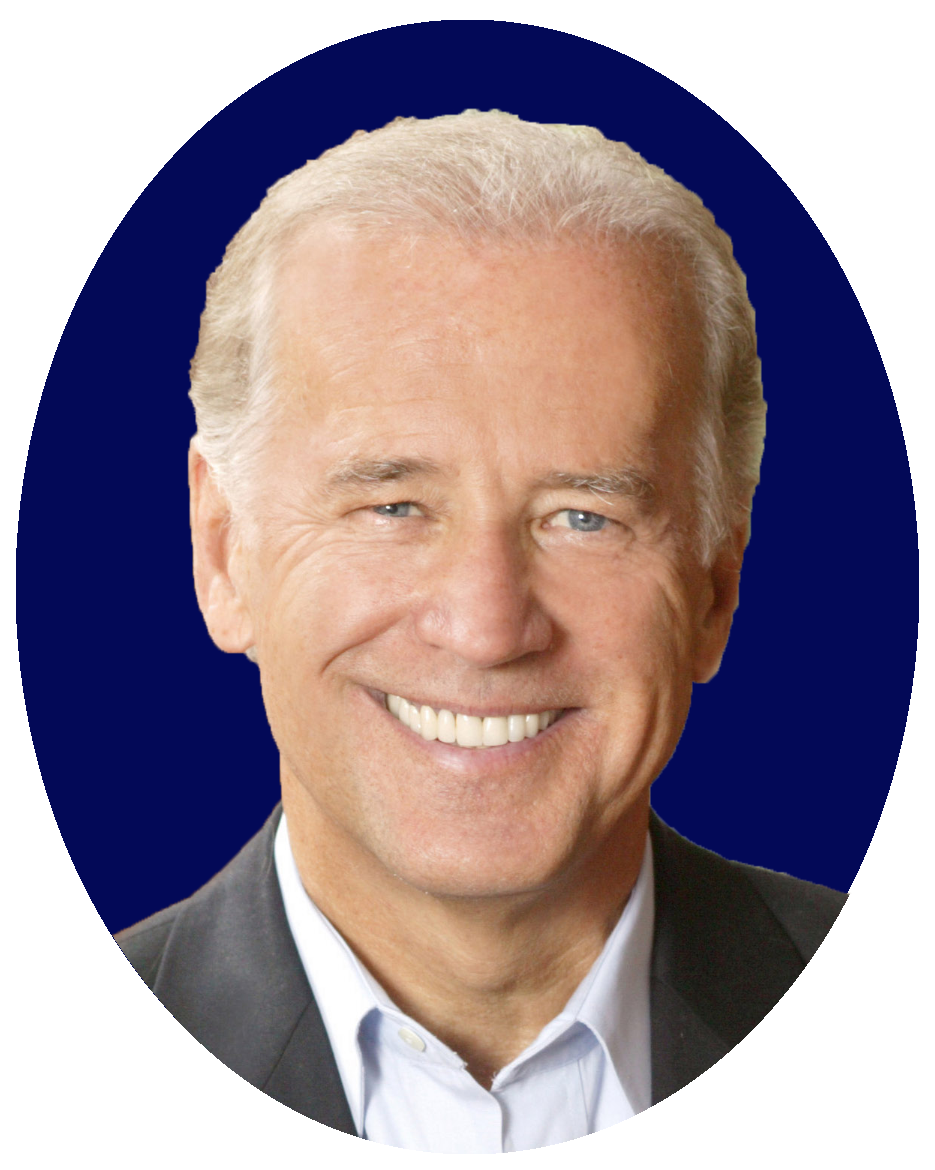
- Nominees; Obama and Biden

Convention
- Date(s): August 25–28, 2008
- City: Denver, Colorado
- Venue: Pepsi Center (August 25 – August 27); Invesco Field at Mile High (August 28)
- Chair: Nancy Pelosi of California
- Keynote speaker: Mark Warner of Virginia
- Notable speakers: Michelle Obama; Ted Kennedy; Hillary Clinton; Bill Clinton; Nancy Pelosi; John Kerry; Al Gore; Dick Durbin

Candidates
- Presidential nominee: Barack Obama of Illinois
- Vice-presidential nominee: Joe Biden of Delaware
- Other candidates: Hillary Clinton

Voting
- Total delegates: 4,419
- Votes needed for nomination: 2,210
- Results (president): Obama (IL): 3,188.5 (72.15%); Clinton (NY): 1,010.5 (22.87%); Abstention: 1 (0.00%); Not Voting: 219 (4.96%)
- Results (vice president): Biden (DE): Acclamation
- Ballots: 1

The 2008 Democratic National Convention was a quadrennial presidential nominating convention of the Democratic Party where it adopted its national platform and officially nominated its candidates for president and vice president. The convention was held in Denver, Colorado, from August 25 to 28, 2008, at the Pepsi Center. Senator Barack Obama from Illinois gave his acceptance speech on August 28 at Invesco Field in what the party called an "Open Convention". Denver last hosted the Democratic National Convention in 1908. Obama became the party's first nonwhite nominee, and nominee of African descent, for president. Senator Joe Biden from Delaware was nominated for vice president.

Obama officially received the nomination for president on August 27, when his former opponent, U.S. Senator Hillary Clinton of New York, interrupted the official roll call to move that Obama be selected by acclamation. Biden accepted the nomination for vice president on the same night. Obama accepted his nomination the following night in a speech at Invesco Field before a record-setting crowd of 84,000 people in attendance.

== Leadership ==
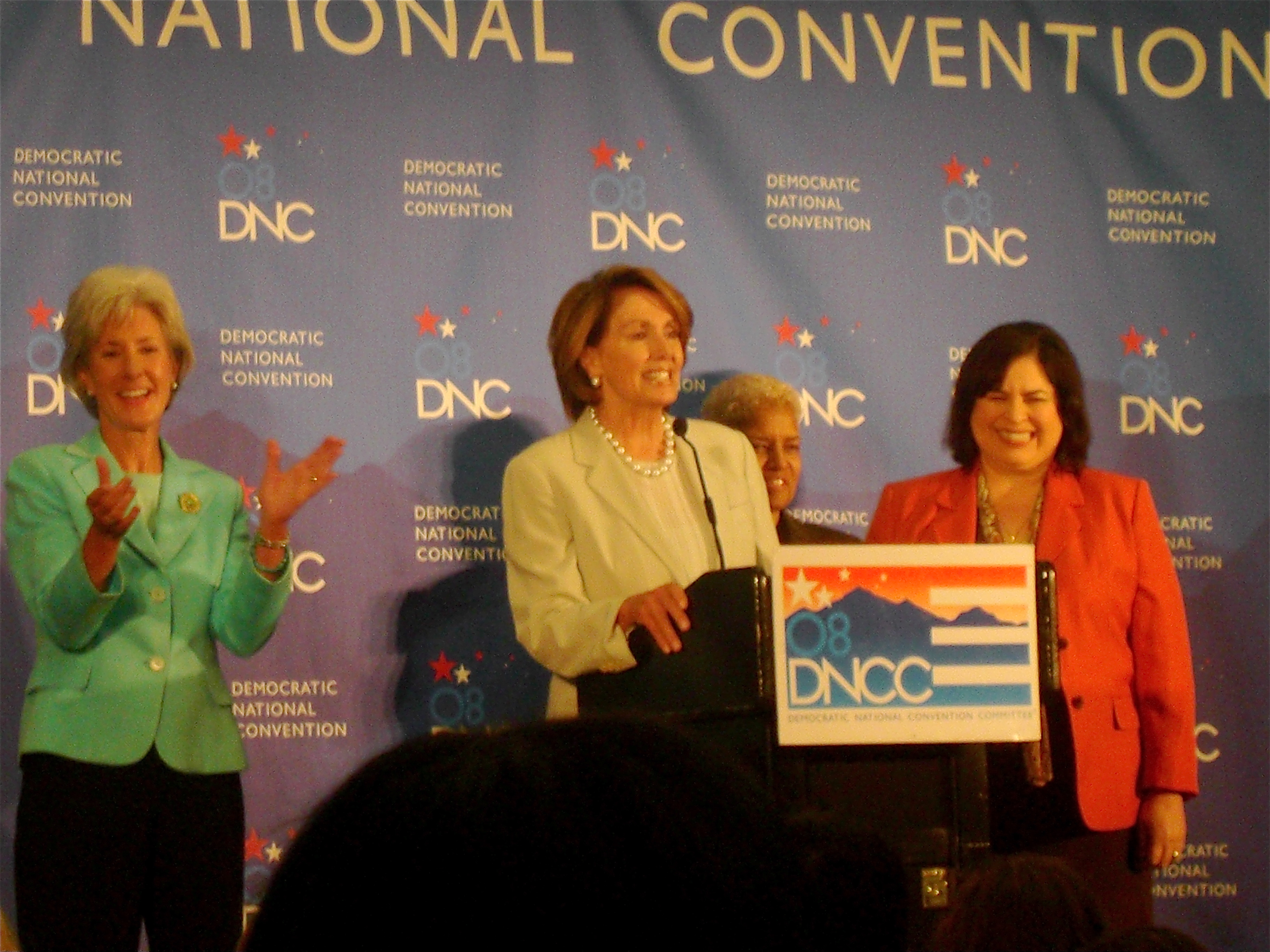
Permanent Chair Nancy Pelosi speaks during a press conference at the Colorado Convention Center the day before the start of the convention, flanked by the three co-chairs.

Howard Dean presided over the political party in his capacity as Chair of the Democratic National Convention. From the national committee, Leah D. Daughtry served as chief executive of the Democratic National Convention Committee. Speaker of the House Nancy Pelosi served as permanent chair of the convention. Sharing in her responsibilities in the convention were three co-chairmen: Kansas Governor Kathleen Sebelius, Texas State Senator Leticia R. Van de Putte, and Atlanta Mayor Shirley Franklin.

== Schedule ==
Choosing to hold the convention the day after the Beijing Olympic Games concluded, the Democratic Party convened in Denver in the last week of August, a week before the Republican National Convention in St. Paul, Minnesota. The decision was made, according to the party, to "maximize momentum for our Democratic ticket in the final months of the Presidential election". Customarily, the party of the incumbent president holds its convention after the opposing party has held theirs.

The Democratic National Committee presented themes for each day of the convention. The August 25 theme was "One Nation". The August 26 theme was "Renewing America's Promise" while its August 27 theme was "Securing America's Future". The August 28 theme highlights Obama's campaign motto, "Change We Can Believe In". Featured speakers crafted their messages to the theme of the day.

== Early party division ==
With close delegate counts for Barack Obama and Hillary Clinton, there was early speculation of the first brokered convention in decades. Democratic National Committee Chair Howard Dean sought to avoid such a circumstance.

In addition to the possibility of a brokered convention, a dispute over seating delegates from Florida and Michigan led some to compare the year's convention with the 1968 Democratic National Convention, which ended in a divided party and unhappiness over the outcome. This speculation ended when Obama was declared the presumptive nominee on June 3, 2008, and Clinton officially announced later that week that she was suspending her campaign and was fully endorsing Obama.

== Rules ==
On February 2, 2007, the Democratic Party published "Call for the 2008 Democratic National Convention," the rules governing the convention. There were 3,409.5 pledged delegates, those committed to vote for a particular candidate, selected by primary voters and caucus participants. There were about 823.5 unpledged delegates, those free to vote for any candidate, colloquially known as "superdelegates", for a total of about 4,233 delegates, requiring 2,117 votes to constitute a majority of the convention. The superdelegates consisted of DNC members, Democratic Congress members and Governors, and other prominent Democrats.

The pledged delegates were allocated among the states, the District of Columbia and Puerto Rico, according to two main criteria: 1) proportion of votes each state gave the candidate in the last three presidential elections; and 2) percentage of votes each state has in the Electoral College. Fixed numbers of delegates were allocated for American Samoa, Guam, the United States Virgin Islands, and Democrats Abroad. Under the party's Delegate Selection Rules for the 2008 Democratic National Convention, delegates were awarded through proportional representation with a minimum threshold of 15% of votes in a state or congressional district to receive delegates. The delegate population must reflect the state's ethnic distribution, and at least 50% of the delegates must be women.

== Results of delegate voting ==
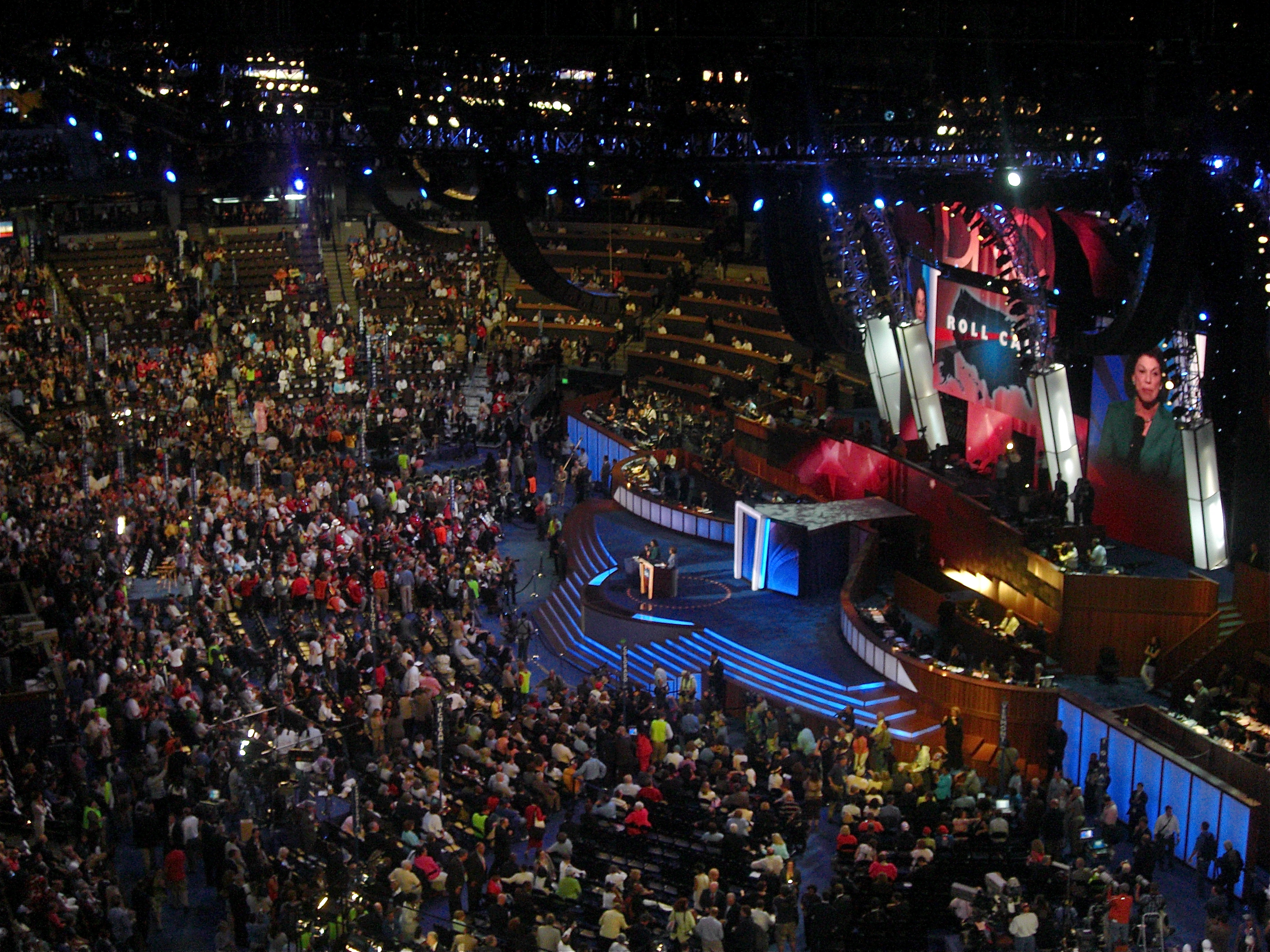
Democratic National Committee Secretary Alice Travis Germond opens the roll call of the states during the third day of the convention.

Along with presumptive presidential nominee Barack Obama, former opponent Hillary Clinton's name was also placed in the roll call vote for nomination. The Los Angeles Times noted that this has occurred before: Jerry Brown's name was entered into the roll call after losing to Bill Clinton in 1992; Jesse Jackson and Gary Hart also had their names added after losing to Walter F. Mondale in 1984; while Jackson's name was also entered into the roll call after losing to Michael Dukakis in 1988. In 1980, Senator Ted Kennedy's name was entered into the roll call after losing to Jimmy Carter. In addition, Clinton became only the fourth woman to have her name placed in nomination for president at a major party convention. (U.S. Sen. Margaret Chase Smith of Maine was placed in nomination at the 1964 Republican National Convention, and U.S. Rep. Shirley Chisholm of New York was placed in nomination at the 1972 Democratic National Convention. In 1976, anti-abortionist Ellen McCormack had her name placed in nomination along with Mo Udall, Jimmy Carter and Jerry Brown.) Clinton would have her name placed in nomination for president once more, in 2016, along with Bernie Sanders.

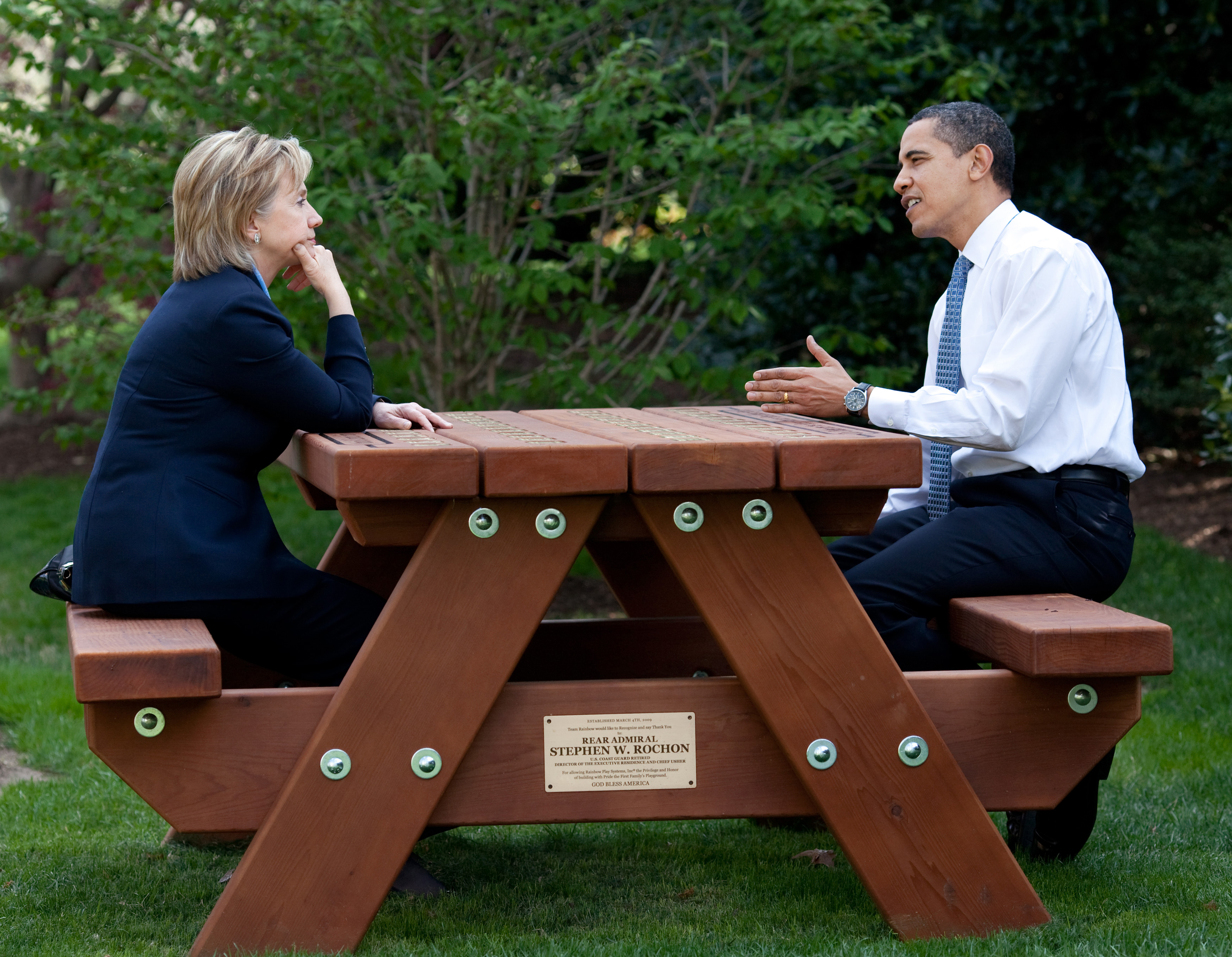
Senators Hillary Clinton and Barack Obama

=== President ===
Democratic National Convention presidential vote, 2008
Candidate	Votes	Percentage
Barack Obama	3,188.5	72.15%
Hillary Clinton	1,010.5	22.87%
Abstentions	1.0	0.00%
Delegates who did not vote^{[A]}	219.0	4.96%
Totals	4,419.0	100.00%

Part way through the roll call (the New Mexico delegation first yielded to the Illinois delegation, who then yielded to the New York delegation), Senator Clinton of New York stated, "Madame Secretary, I move that the convention suspend the procedural rules and suspend the further conduct of the roll call vote. All votes cast by the delegates will be counted, and that I move Senator Barack Obama of Illinois be selected by this convention by acclamation as the nominee of the Democratic Party for president of the United States." This was done and the verbal roll call vote was halted. Earlier the same day, Clinton had released her delegates, allowing them to vote for Obama. Along with the verbal roll call, a paper ballot was taken. The results were 3,188.5 for Obama and 1,010.5 for Clinton. There are an additional 219 votes that were not cast.

=== Vice president ===
Joe Biden was nominated by acclamation.

== Venue ==
Sites of the 2008 national presidential nominating conventions

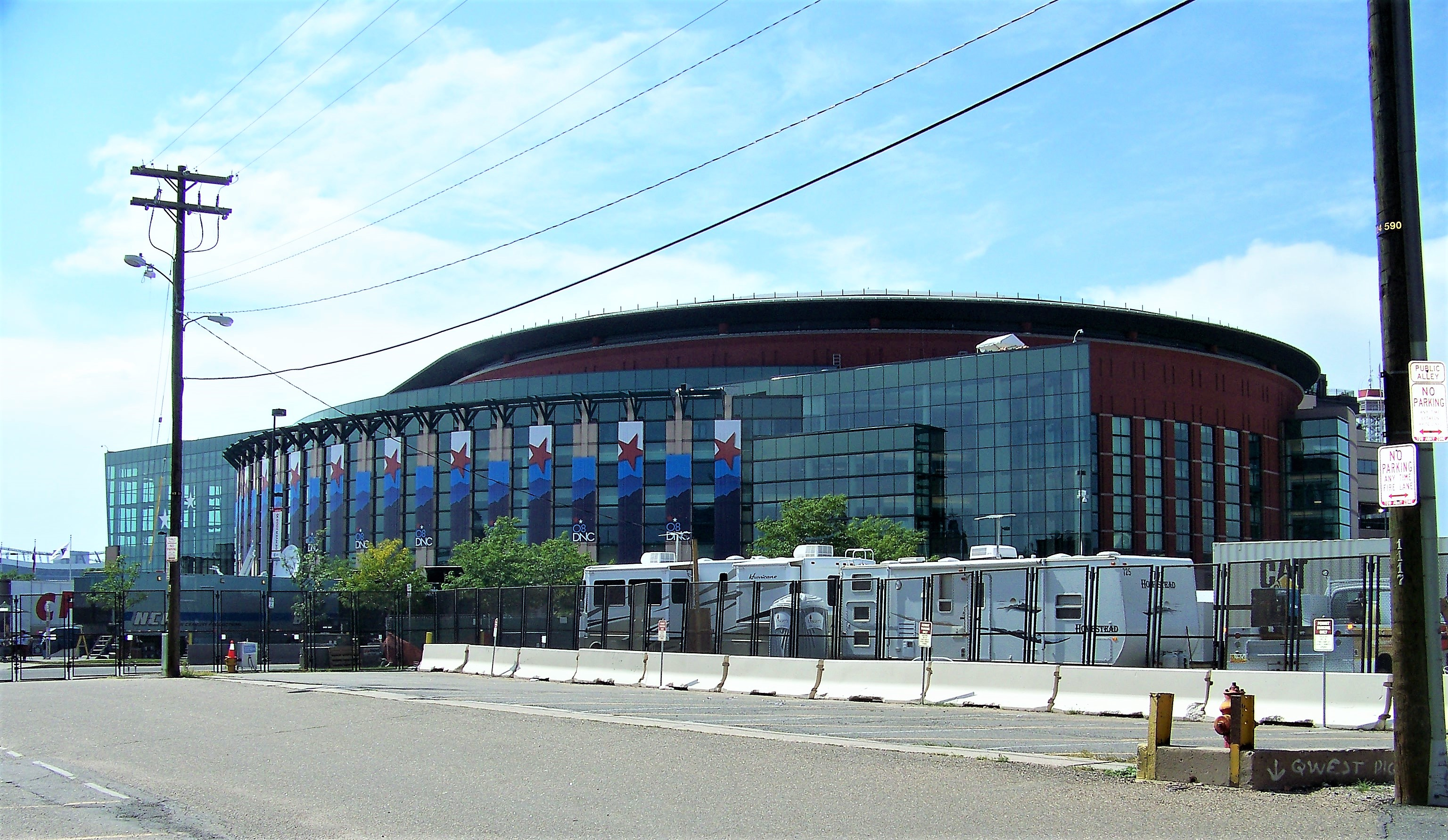
The 2008 Democratic National Convention was held in Denver's Pepsi Center.

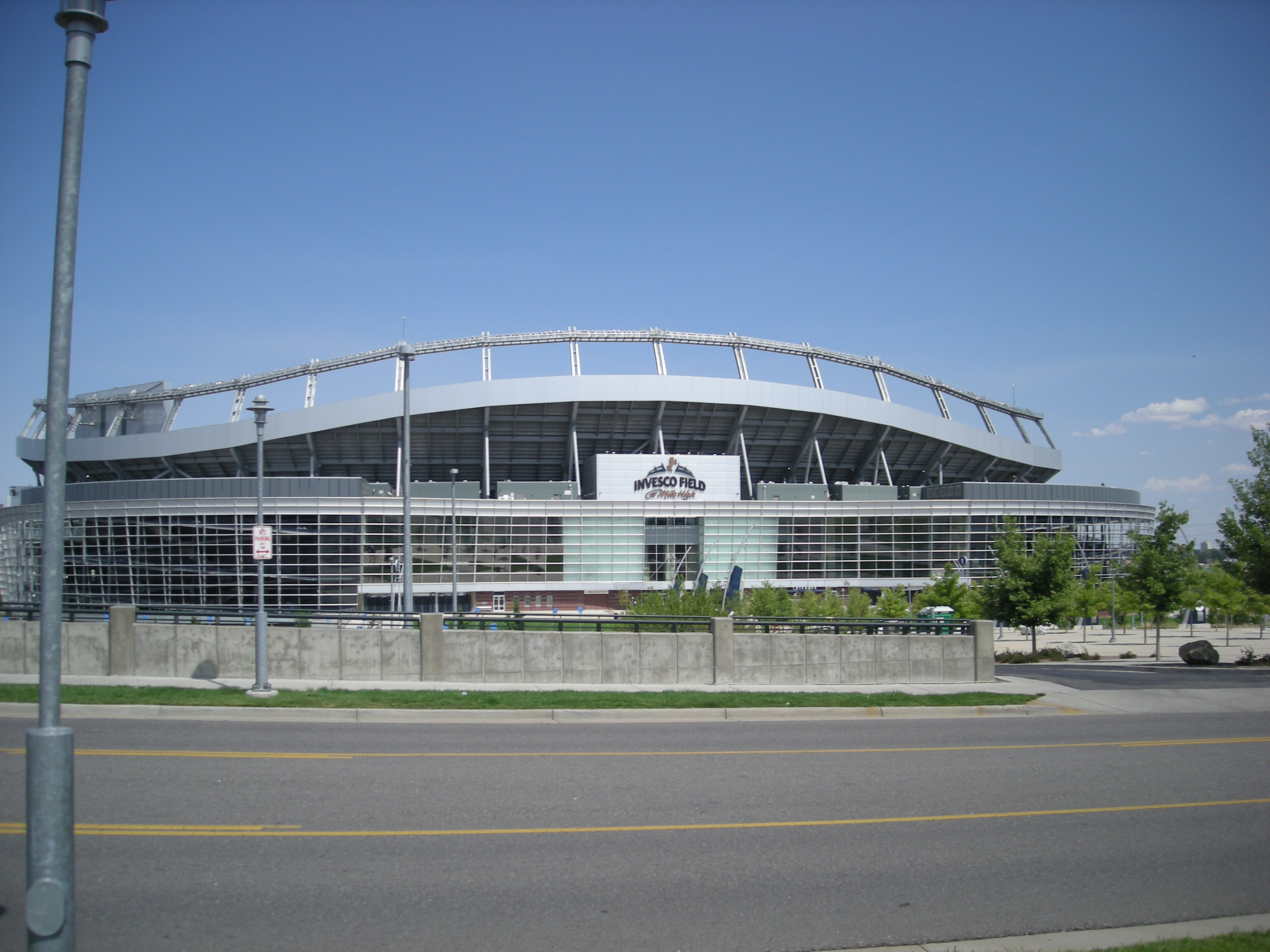
Invesco Field at Mile High, where Senator Barack Obama gave his acceptance speech

=== Site selection ===
In late November 2005, 35 locations were invited by the DNC to bid for the right to host the 2008 convention: Atlanta, Baltimore, Boston, Charlotte, Chicago, Cleveland, Dallas, Denver, Detroit, Houston, Indianapolis, Kansas City, Las Vegas, Los Angeles, Memphis, Miami, Miami-Dade County, Milwaukee, Minneapolis/St. Paul, Nashville, New Orleans, New York City, Orlando, Philadelphia, Phoenix, Pittsburgh, Portland, St. Louis, Sacramento, Salt Lake City, San Antonio, San Diego, San Francisco, Seattle, and Washington, D.C.

Eleven cities originally accepted the invitation to bid for the convention in January 2006: Anaheim, Dallas, Denver, Detroit, Las Vegas, Minneapolis–St. Paul, New Orleans, New York City, Orlando, Phoenix, and San Antonio. A formal request for proposal was mailed to participating cities on February 27 and the deadline for cities to respond was May 19, 2006.

Only three cities submitted final proposals to host the convention: Denver, Minneapolis-St. Paul, and New York. New Orleans had submitted an initial bid, but on July 12, the city dropped out. The cities were visited by a 10-member Technical Advisory Committee in June 2006. On September 27, the Republicans announced they would have their 2008 convention in St. Paul, removing it from consideration and leaving only Denver and New York as potential hosts. Despite hard lobbying by New York party boosters, then-Republican Mayor Michael Bloomberg dealt the campaign a major blow when he announced the city lacked the financial means to support a convention. Denver was chosen as the host on January 11, 2007, as Democrats looked to make gains in the "Purple West" states of Colorado, Nevada, and New Mexico.

=== Preparations ===
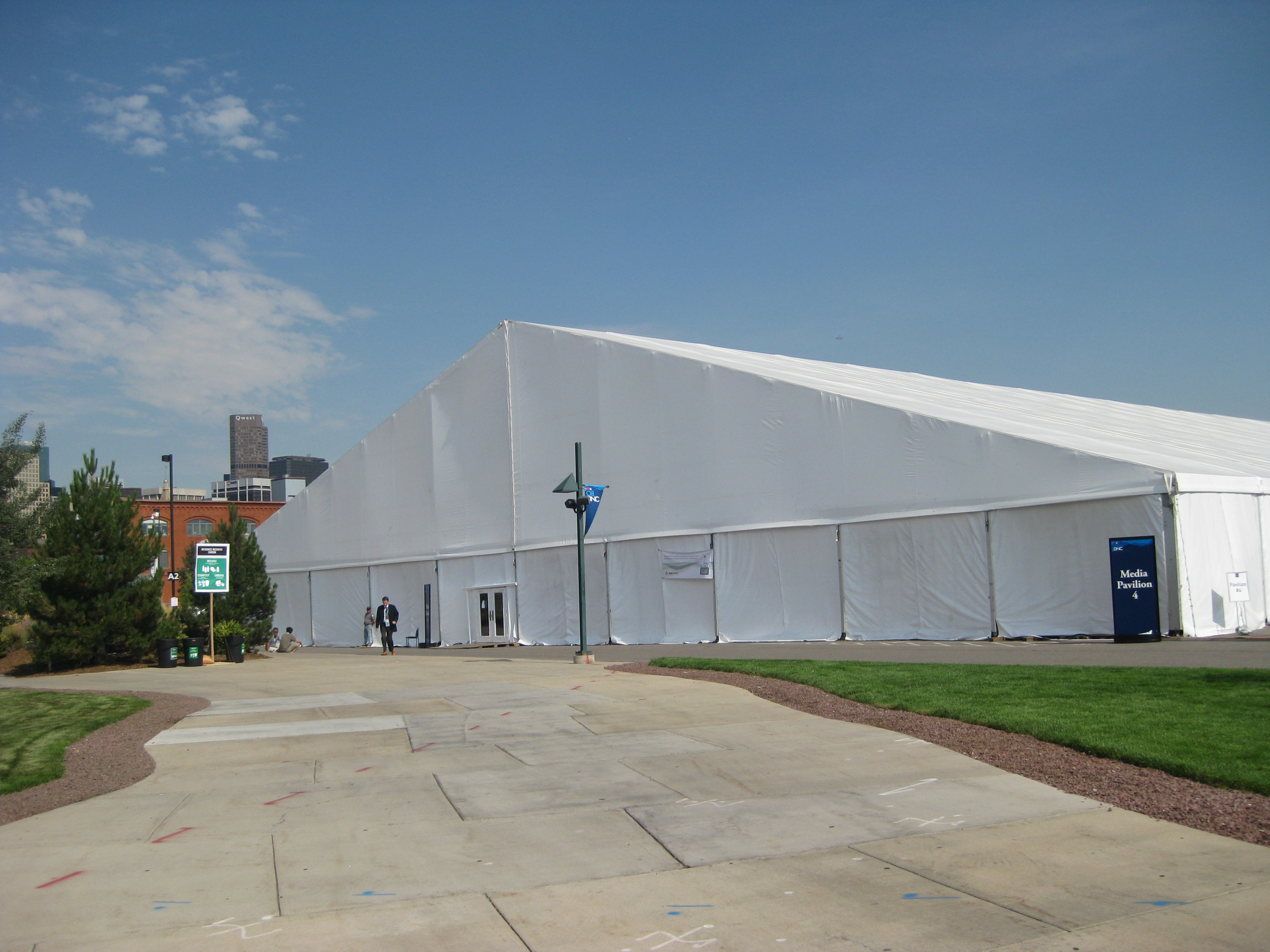
A temporary building was erected for use by the media.

The work to prepare Pepsi Center for the Democratic National Convention was expected to cost $15 million. In addition, a 220,000-square-foot (20,000 m^{2}) temporary building to be used by the media was built near Pepsi Center.

Convention organizers, including the Democratic National Convention Committee and the Denver 2008 Convention Host Committee, expected 50,000 attendees, of whom 5,000 were delegates and 15,000 media personnel. However, they anticipated 75,000 people coming to watch Obama accept the nomination on Thursday.

The stage erected at Invesco Field for the convention's final evening featured doric columns meant to evoke the White House's neoclassical architecture. Some critics criticized this design as evoking imperial imagery.

=== Labor issues ===
The head of the International Alliance of Theatrical Stage Employees Local No. 7, Jim Taylor, refused to sign a no-strike agreement for the convention. Pepsi Center normally uses nonunion labor, but used Taylor's union during the convention, and Taylor wanted Pepsi Center to use his union for all events.

=== Security measures ===
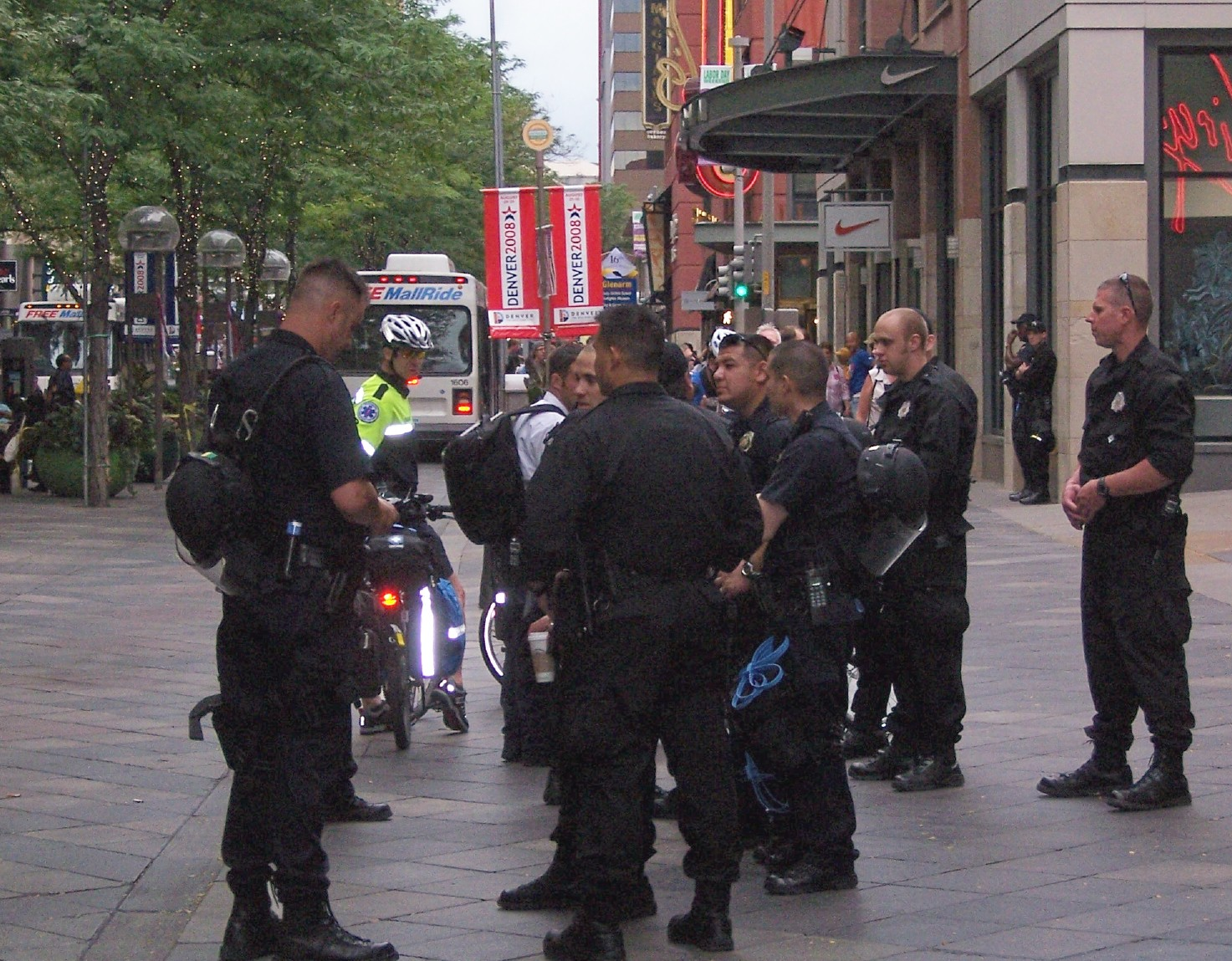
Denver Police bear riot gear during the 2008 Democratic National Convention

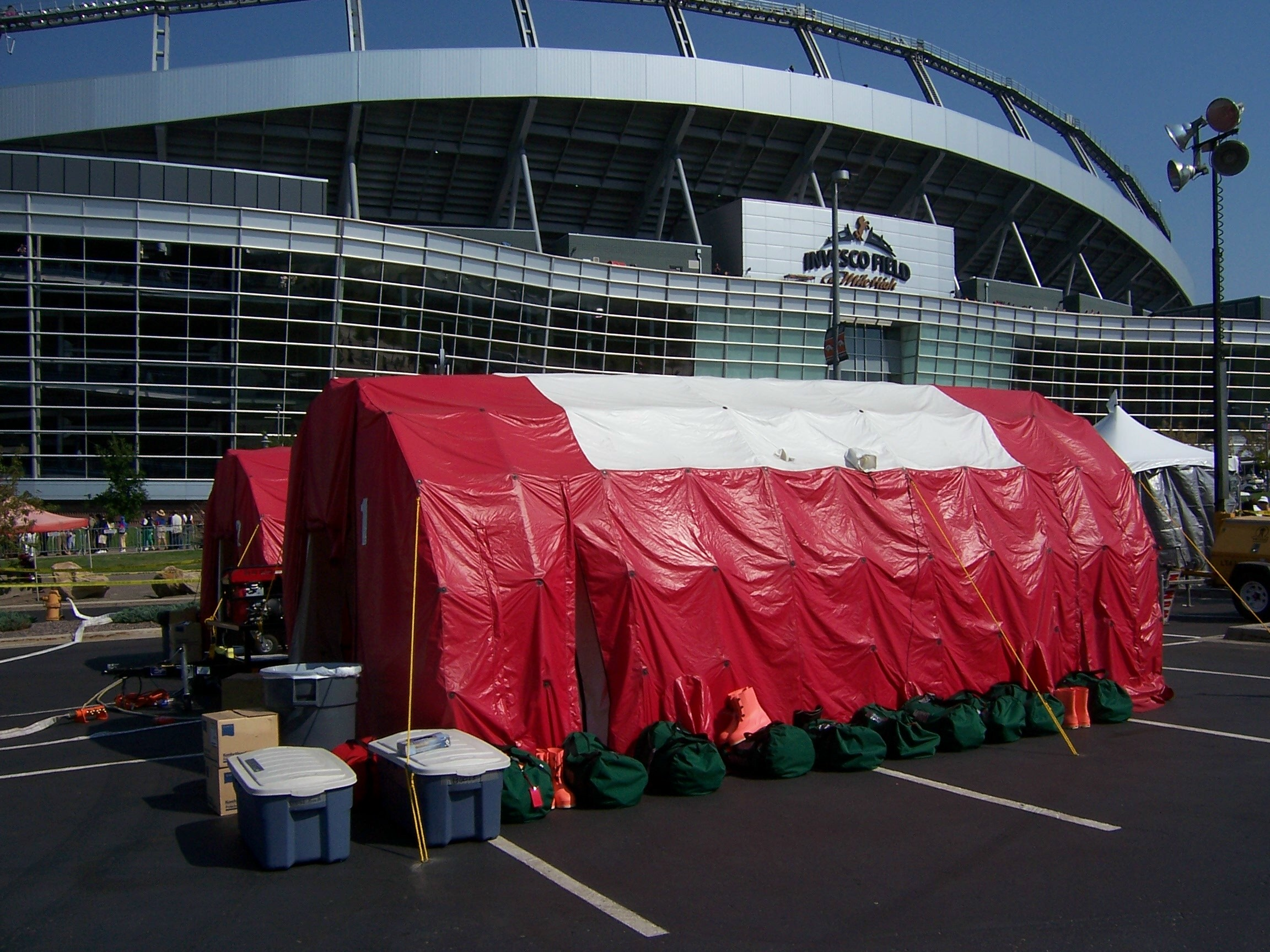
A "decontamination tent" was maintained by security in front of INVESCO field, where Obama spoke on the last day of the 2008 Democratic National Convention.

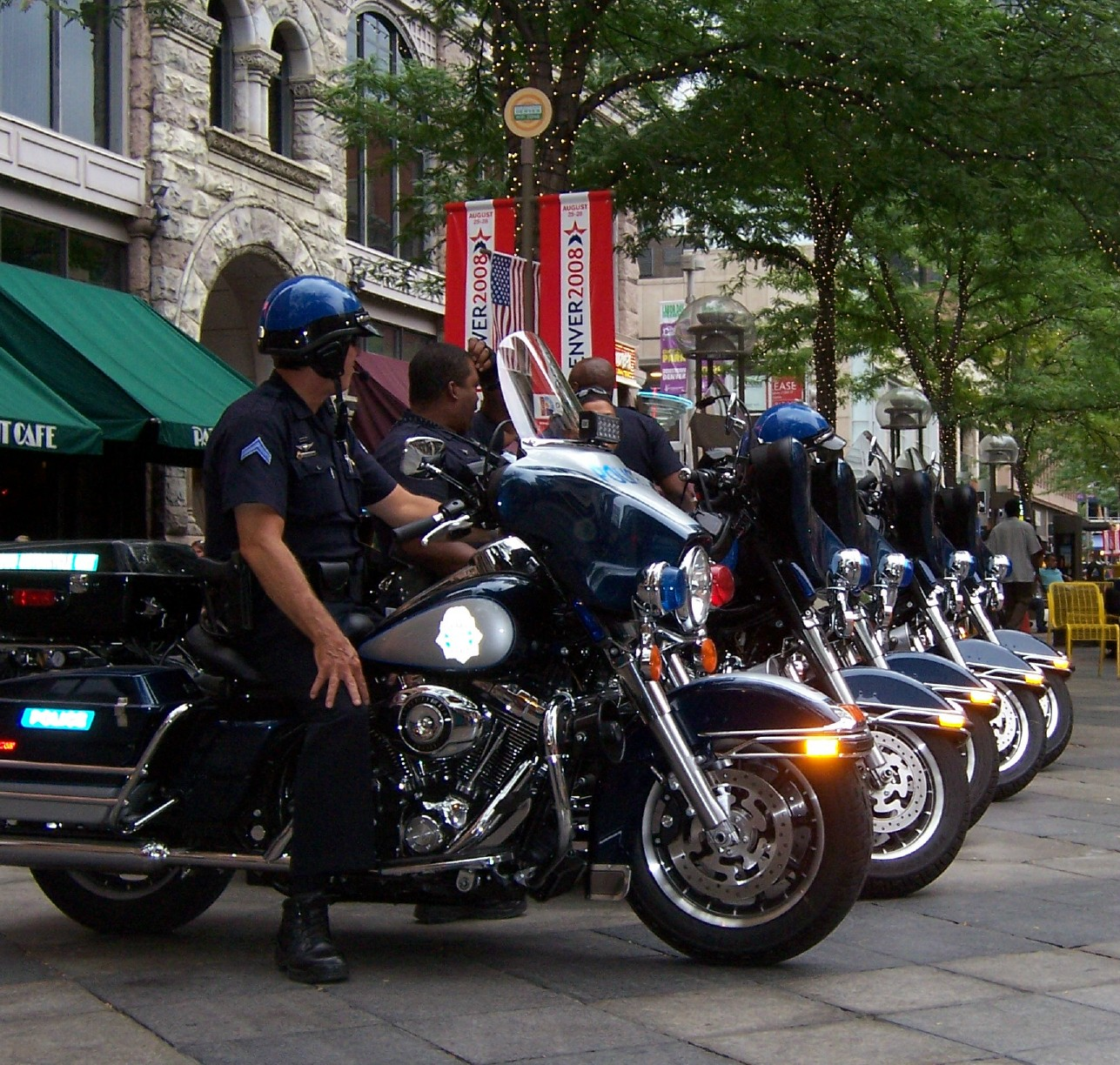
Denver Police patrol the "LoDo" (Lower Downtown) district during the convention

As with past political conventions since 2000, the Democratic National Convention was designated a National Special Security Event (NSSE) by the United States Department of Homeland Security (DHS).

The Denver Police Department doubled in size to 3,000 officers for the DNC, by including other police from 52 neighboring law enforcement agencies. Police were equipped with riot gear in preparation for unorganized protests. Throughout the event, a total of 152 arrests were made for offenses related to the convention.

== Principal speakers ==
=== Monday, August 25 ===
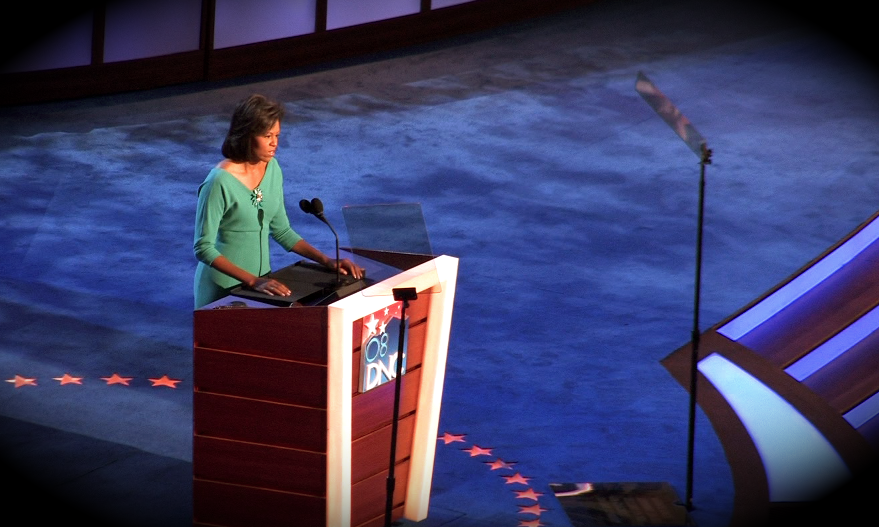
Michelle Obama speaking as the convention's opening night's headliner

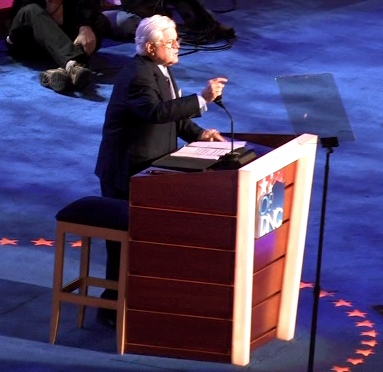
Ted Kennedy speaks during the first night of the Convention.

The theme for the day was "One Nation," with Michelle Obama as the "headline prime-time speaker." She was introduced by her brother, Craig Robinson. In her speech, she explained how her husband embraced the "One Nation" idea:

See, that's why Barack's running: to end the war in Iraq responsibly...
... to build an economy that lifts every family, to make sure health care is available for every American, and to make sure that every single child in this nation has a world-class education all the way from preschool to college. That's what Barack Obama will do as president of the United States of America.
He'll achieve these goals the same way he always has, by bringing us together and reminding us how much we share and how alike we really are. You see, Barack doesn't care where you're from, or what your background is, or what party, if any, you belong to. See, that's just not how he sees the world. He knows that thread that connects us – our belief in America's promise, our commitment to our children's future – he knows that that thread is strong enough to hold us together as one nation even when we disagree.

Also, Maya Soetoro-Ng spoke briefly on growing up with her older brother Barack Obama, and brought an Asian-American presence to the stage for the first time. The Work to Come: A Tribute to Senator Edward Kennedy, directed and produced by Mark Herzog and Chris Cowen in association with Ken Burns, was introduced by Kennedy's niece, Caroline Kennedy. Consistent with the theme of the evening, Former Republican congressman Jim Leach gave his public endorsement of Barack Obama. His speech was introduced by Senator Tom Harkin, a fellow Iowan. Senator Kennedy was not expected to attend the convention due to his illness, but nevertheless made a surprise appearance and speech in the evening. A video about former President Jimmy Carter's humanitarian work was also shown, followed by a brief appearance by the president himself.

=== Tuesday, August 26 ===
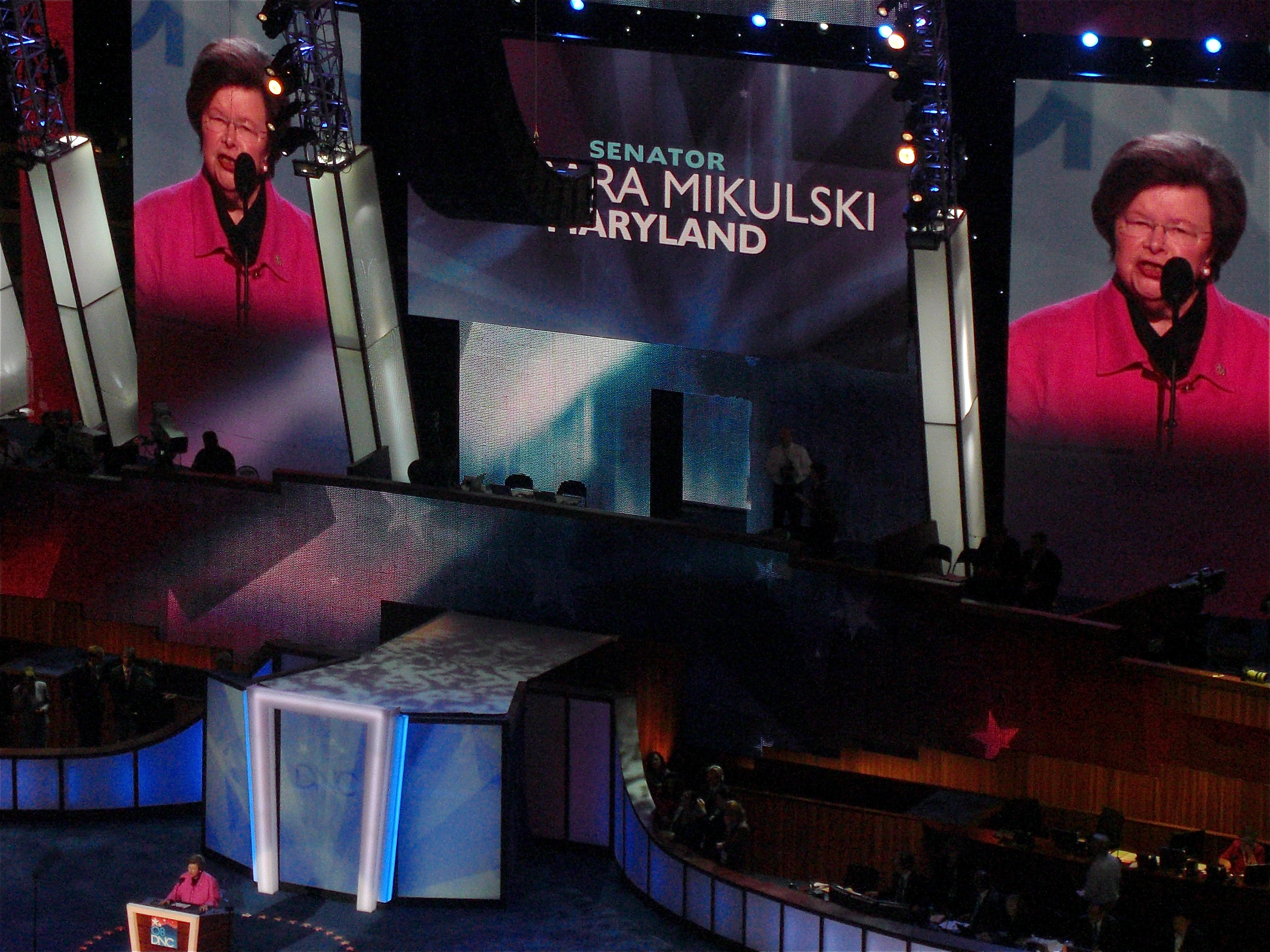
Senator Barbara Mikulski speaks during the second day of the Convention.

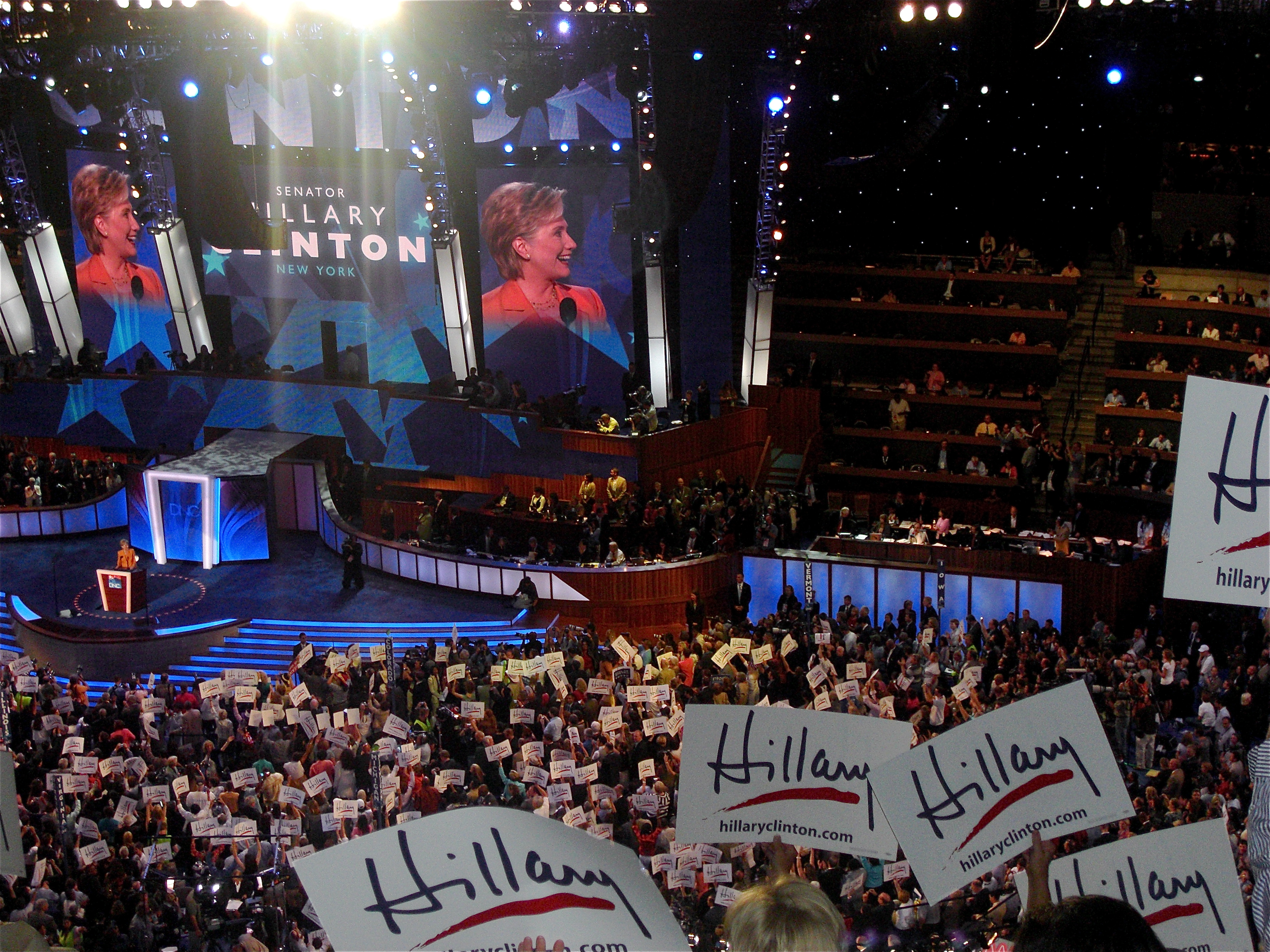
Hillary Clinton speaks during the second night of the Convention.

The theme for the day was "Renewing America's Promise." Senator Barbara Mikulski was one of several elected women Democrats selected to speak that evening. Senator Hillary Clinton was the headline prime-time speaker. In her speech, with former President Bill Clinton watching, Hillary declared, "We are on the same team."

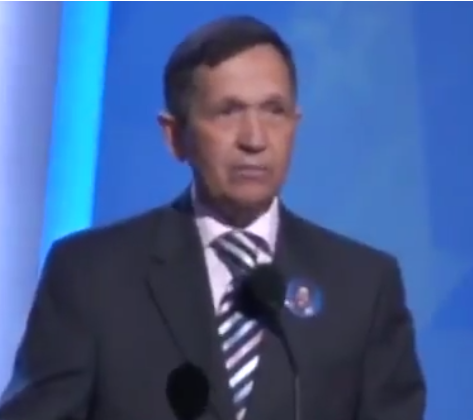
Ohio Congressman Dennis Kucinich addresses the Convention audience on August 26, 2008.

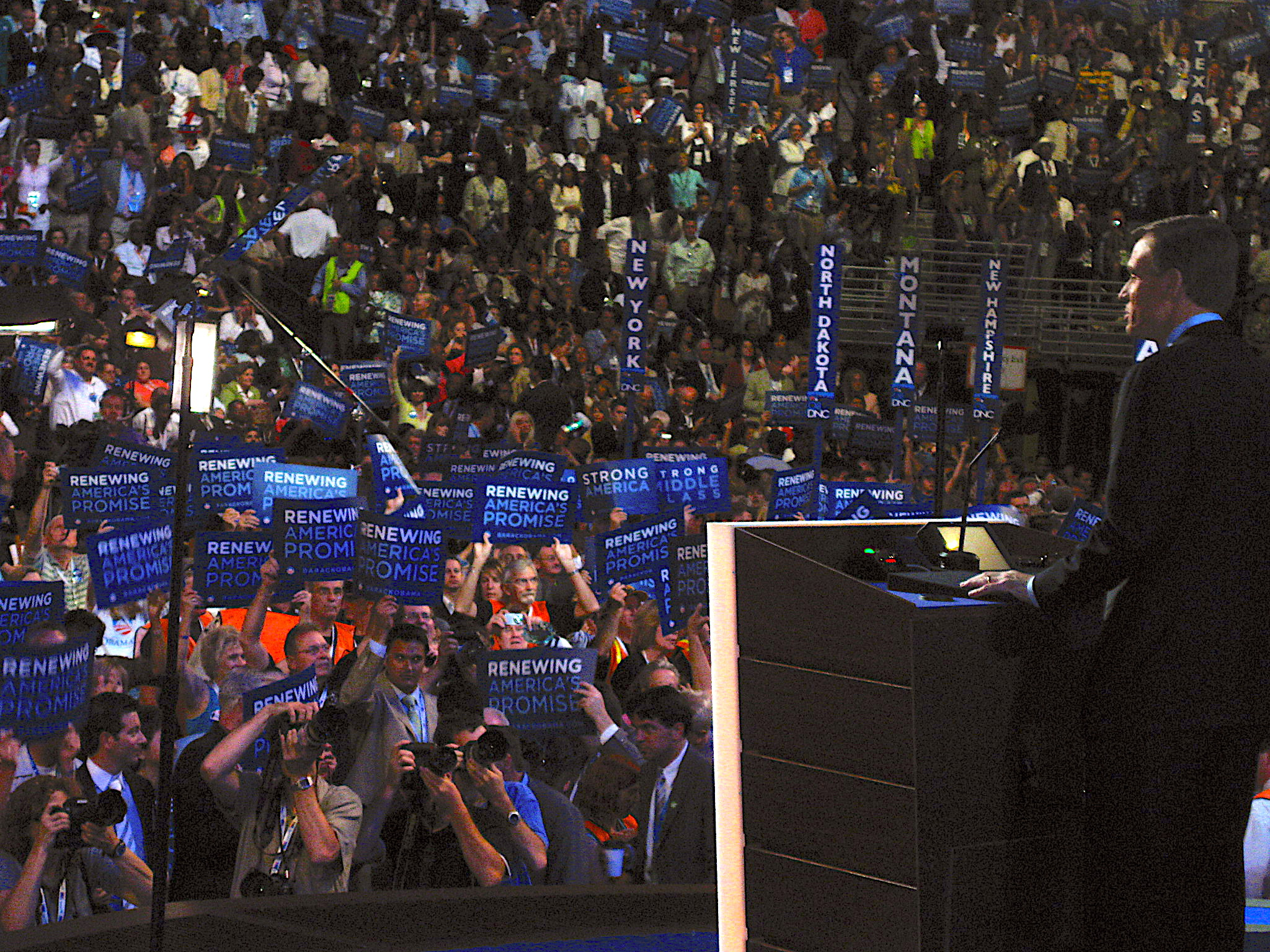
Mark Warner delivering the keynote speech

Former Virginia Governor Mark Warner delivered the keynote address which included references to new job creation:

That's a story worth rewriting all across America. With the right leadership, we can once again achieve a standard of living that is improved – and not diminished – in each generation. We can once again make America a beacon for science and technology and discovery. Ladies and gentlemen, we know how to do it. The American people are ready.

And Barack Obama and Joe Biden will get it done.

Ohio Representative Dennis Kucinich, who had also run as a presidential candidate in the 2008 Democratic Party primaries, gave a spirited speech structured around the refrain "Wake up America!" The speech levies trenchant criticism of the perceived abuses of power of the George W. Bush administration, attacks the corporate control of the American political and economic systems and rallies for a program of universal health coverage, universal higher education, tax reform, trade policy reform, energy regulation, civil liberties and de-militarization. At the end of the speech, Kucinich endorses Barack Obama and Joe Biden for president and vice-president. His words electrified the audience who began delivering a standing ovation midway through the speech and continued cheering past its closure.

=== Wednesday, August 27 ===
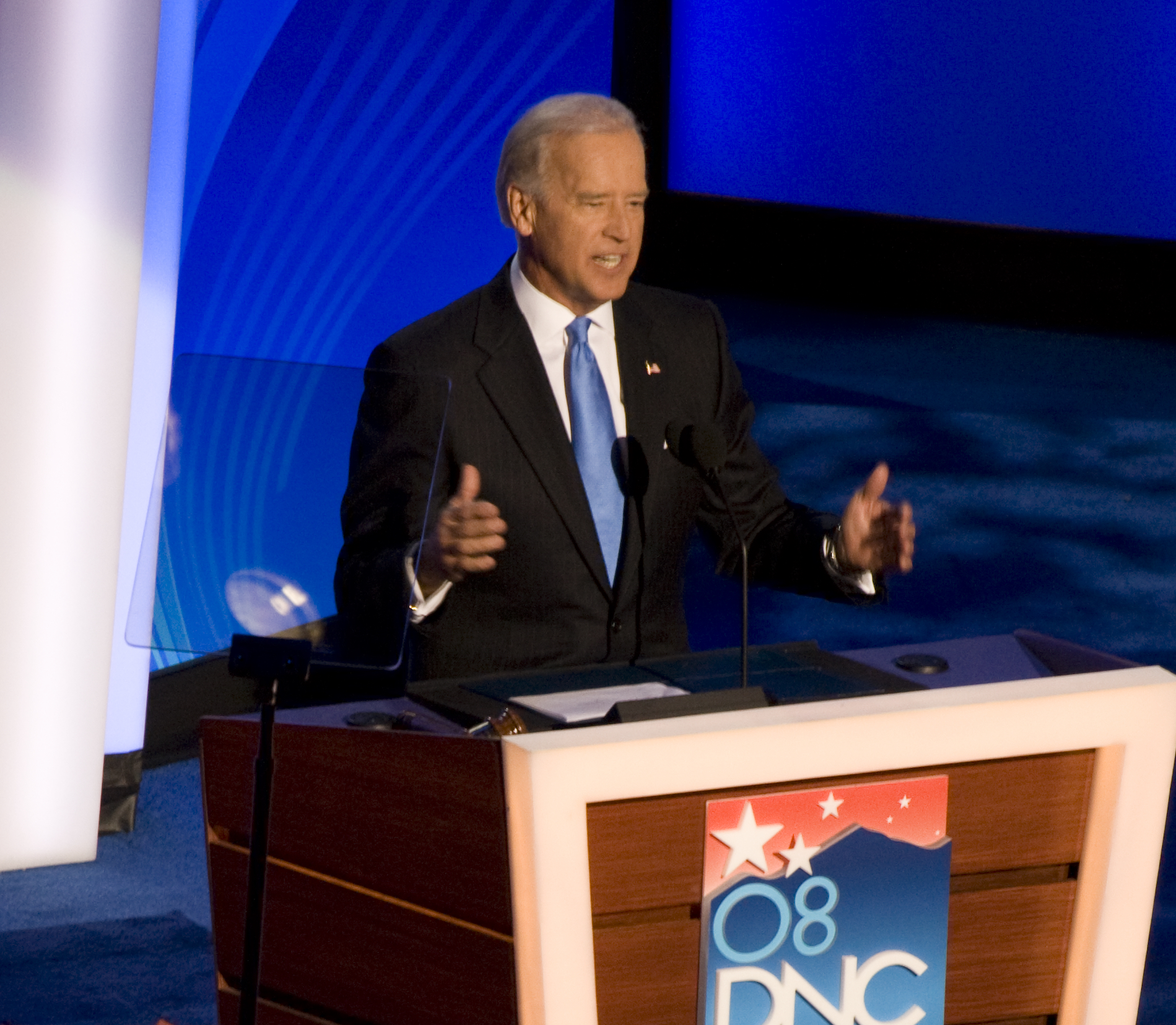
Biden delivers his nomination acceptance speech on the third night.

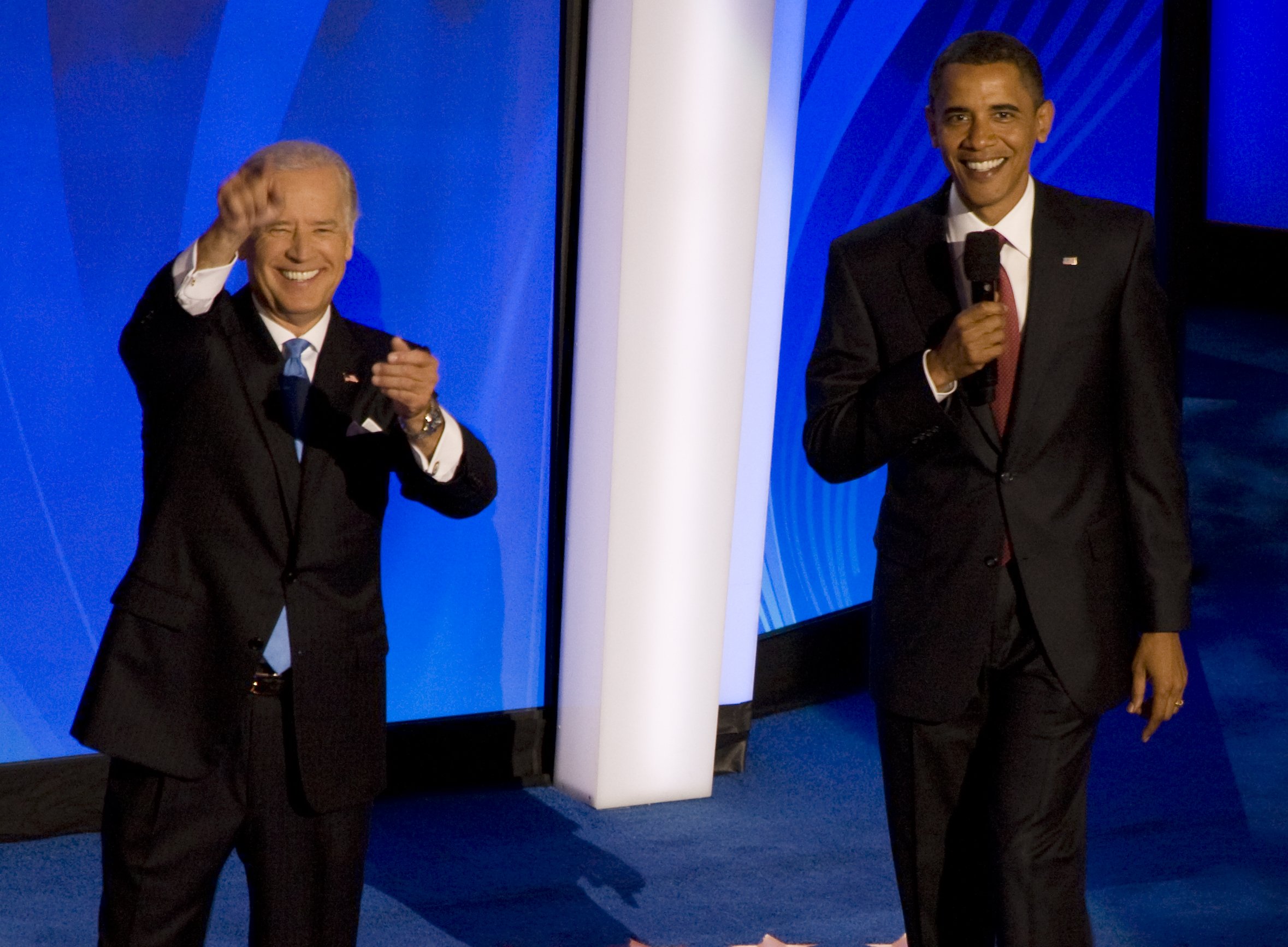
Obama and Biden appear after Biden's speech.

The theme for the day was "Securing America's Future". It featured a speech by Joe Biden, the vice presidential candidate. Before his speech he was introduced by his oldest son Beau Biden, Delaware's Attorney General.

In that speech Beau talked about how his father would tuck him and his siblings into bed each night after returning home, how he refused invitations to cocktail parties in DC because he did not want to miss his granddaughter (Beau's daughter) Natalie's birthday. He remembered the accident that killed his mother and sister and how his father took the Senate oath at his and his brother's bedside. Several years later his father remarried "their Mom Jill" and their family was rebuilt. In the end Beau, whose Delaware National Guard unit where he is Captain was to be deployed to Iraq, said that while his father was always there for him, his duties that fall would prevent him from being there for his Dad. Thus he asked his family and everyone else to be there in November for his father and to be there for Barack Obama and make this country better again.

Joe Biden, in his speech, contrasted the two presidential candidates:

You know, you can learn a lot about a man campaigning with him, debating him, seeing how he reacts under pressure. You learn about the strength of his mind. But even more importantly, you learn about the quality of his heart.
I watched how Barack touched people, how he inspired them. And I realized he had tapped into the oldest belief in America: We don't have to accept the situation we cannot bear; we have the power to change it.
And change it – and changing it is exactly what Barack Obama will do. That's what he'll do for this country.
You know, John McCain is my friend. And I know you hear that phrase used all the time in politics. I mean it. John McCain is my friend. We've traveled the world together. It's a friendship that goes beyond politics. And the personal courage and heroism demonstrated by John still amazes me.

But I profoundly – I profoundly disagree with the direction John wants to take this country, from Afghanistan to Iraq, from Amtrak to veterans. John thinks that, during the Bush years, quote, "We've made great economic progress." I think it's been abysmal. And in the Senate, John has voted with President Bush 95 percent. And that is very hard to believe.

Other speakers included former president Bill Clinton, 2004 presidential candidate Sen. John Kerry (MA), and Sen. Evan Bayh (IN). In his remarks, Clinton assessed Obama's readiness to be president:

Clearly, the job of the next president is to rebuild the American dream and to restore American leadership in the world.
And here's what I have to say about that. Everything I learned in my eight years as president, and in the work I have done since in America and across the globe, has convinced me that Barack Obama is the man for this job.
Now, he has a remarkable ability to inspire people, to raise our hopes and rally us to high purpose. He has the intelligence and curiosity every successful president needs. His policies on the economy, on taxes, on health care, on energy are far superior to the Republican alternatives.
He has shown – he has shown a clear grasp of foreign policy and national security challenges and a firm commitment to rebuild our badly strained military. His family heritage and his life experiences have given him a unique capacity to lead our increasingly diverse nation in an ever more interdependent world.
The long, hard primary tested and strengthened him. And in his first presidential decision, the selection of a running mate, he hit it out of the park.
With Joe Biden's experience and wisdom, supporting Barack Obama's proven understanding, instincts, and insight, America will have the national security leadership we need.

After Joe Biden spoke, his first address as vice presidential nominee, Barack Obama made a surprise appearance praising the convention.

=== Thursday, August 28 ===
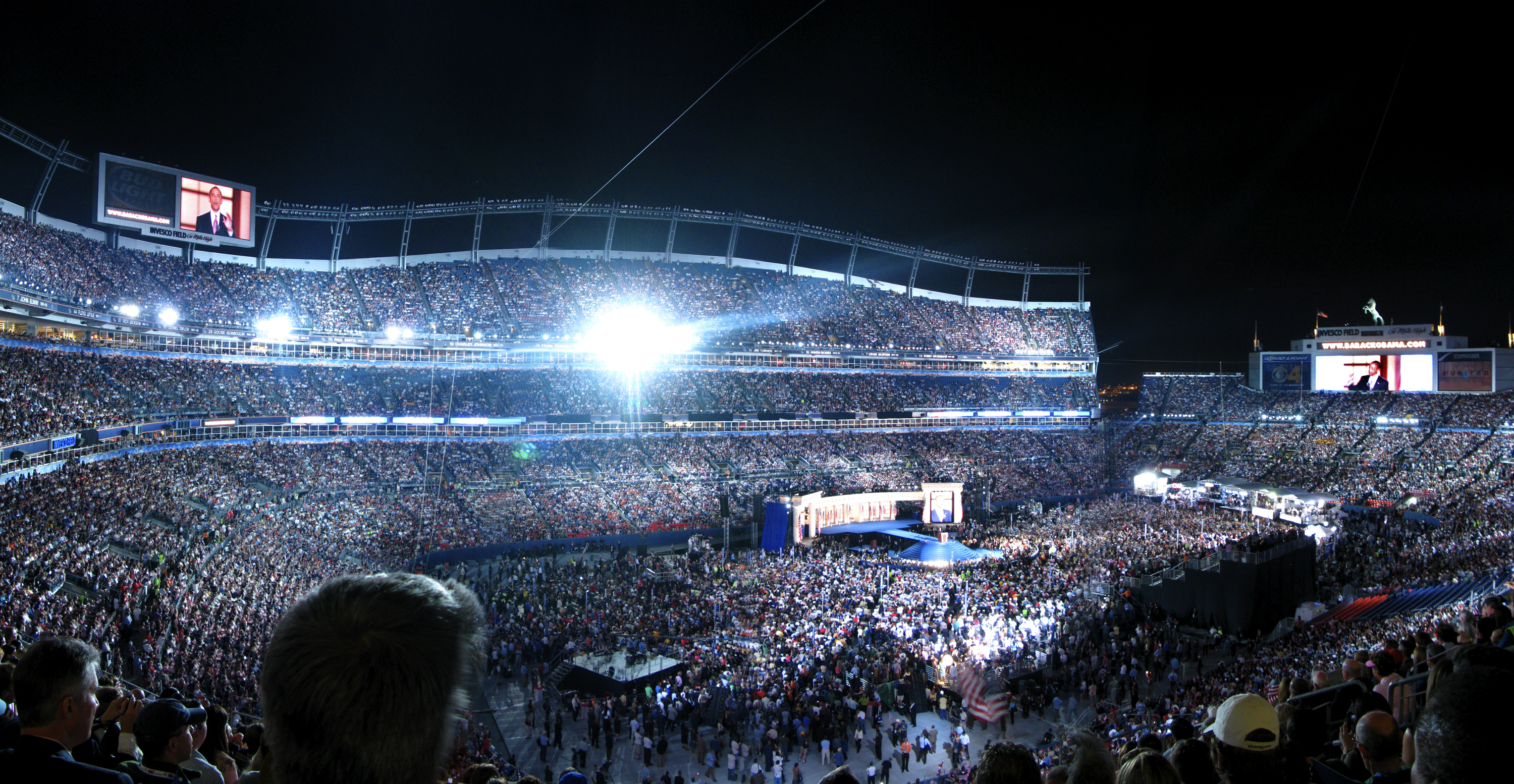
84,000 people filled in Invesco Field for Barack Obama's acceptance speech.

The convention moved to Invesco Field at Mile High, with a DNCC record crowd of more than 84,000 people in attendance. Speakers included former Vice President Al Gore, Governor of Virginia Tim Kaine, Governor of New Mexico Bill Richardson, Illinois Senator Dick Durbin, and the evening culminated in Barack Obama's acceptance speech. More than 38 million people across 10 U.S. cable and broadcast TV networks tuned in to watch.

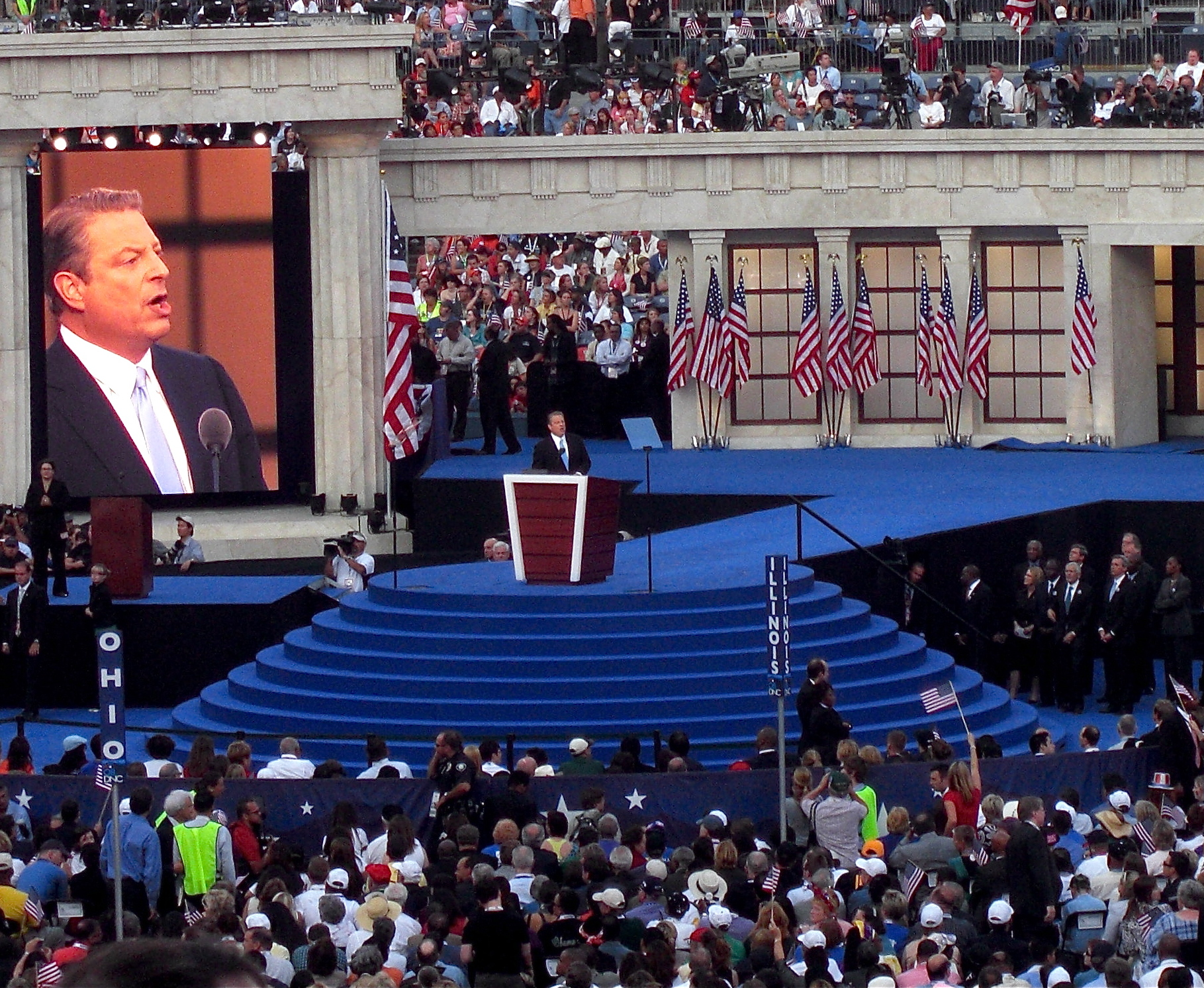
Former Vice President Al Gore speaks prior to Obama's Address.

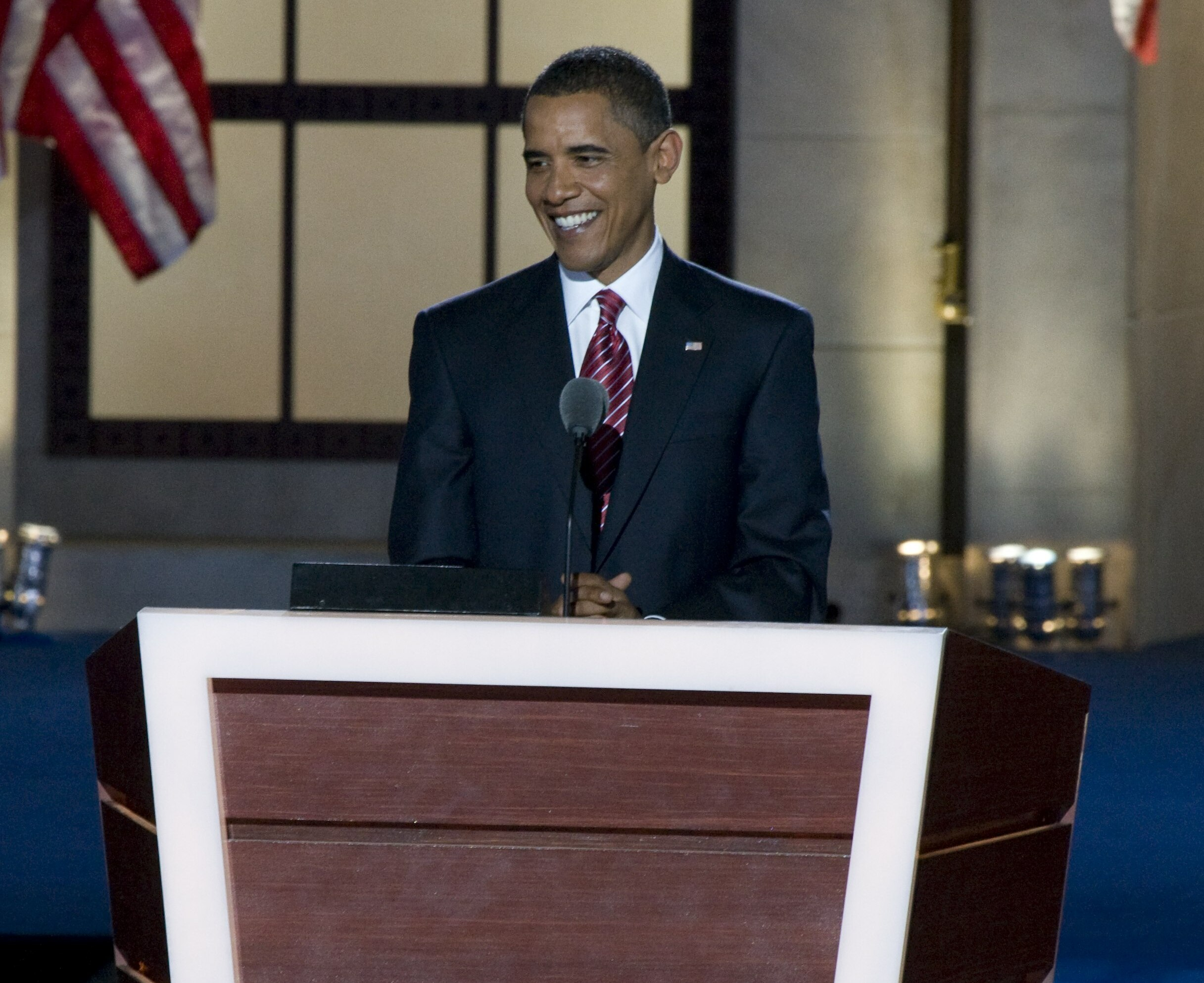
Obama delivering his speech

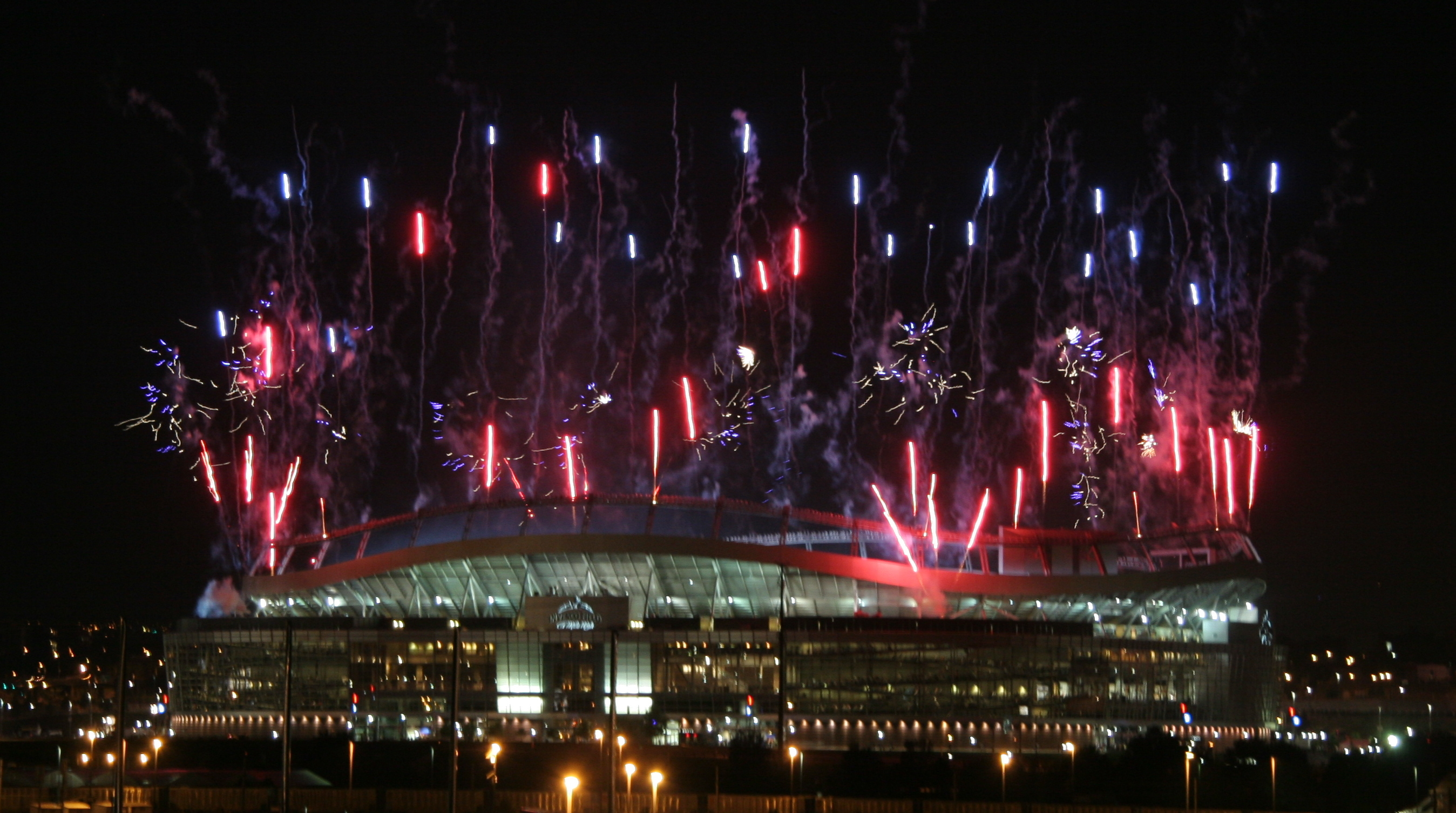
Fireworks at the close of the convention

In his speech, Obama said, "Our government should work for us, not against us. It should ensure opportunity, not for just those with the most money and influence, but for every American who is willing to work. That's the promise of America, the idea that we are responsible for ourselves, but that we also rise and fall as one nation, the fundamental belief that I am my brother's keeper, I am my sister's keeper. That's the promise we need to keep, that's the change we need right now." The speech was well received, one news source calling it "The wrap-up to the party convention blended old-fashioned speechmaking, Hollywood-quality stagecraft and innovative, Internet age politics."

== Controversies ==
=== Seating of delegates from Florida and Michigan ===
The Florida and Michigan legislatures moved forward their primaries to January 2008, in contravention of party rules and were stripped of their delegates. The Clinton campaign with others initially opposed their seating, stating they acknowledged that the delegates from neither Michigan nor Florida would count. However, after winning the Florida and Michigan primaries, Senator Clinton spoke in favor of seating the states' delegates (despite Joe Biden, Barack Obama, Bill Richardson, and John Edwards having removed their names from the Michigan primary ballot). DNC Chair Howard Dean asked Florida and Michigan to submit a new plan for a process to choose the delegates, such as holding primaries again, or let the matter be referred to the Credentials Committee. In May 2008, the rules committee agreed to let their delegates have half a vote each. In August 2008, Senator Barack Obama, the party's presumptive nominee, asked the credentials committee to let the two states have full voting rights at the convention. The credentials committee met on August 24, the day before the convention began, and voted to restore full voting rights to Florida and Michigan.

=== Use of municipal fuel by convention planners ===
From March through July, convention planners were provided subsidized and untaxed fuel from municipal government gas pumps at a price less than retail fuel available to ordinary citizens, reportedly without a signed contract. After the practice became public at a meeting with city council members, only convention planners' buses were allowed to refuel at city facilities.

=== Lawsuit by protesters ===
The American Civil Liberties Union filed a lawsuit on behalf of 12 organizations who planned to protest at the Democratic Convention, requesting that the Secret Service and Denver officials release information about procedures concerning protesting times and the Demonstration Zone. In a June 12 release, a parade route and Demonstration Zone were announced. The Demonstration Zone will be in Parking Lot A of Pepsi Center. Some groups, including two groups opposing abortion chose to delay filing suit after it was announced that their applications for permits are being processed. In an amended complaint, the ACLU and interested advocacy groups have filed suit against the Secret Service and the city and county of Denver, questioning the constitutionality of the restrictions. The lawsuit failed and the ACLU did not appeal.

=== Demonstration zone ===
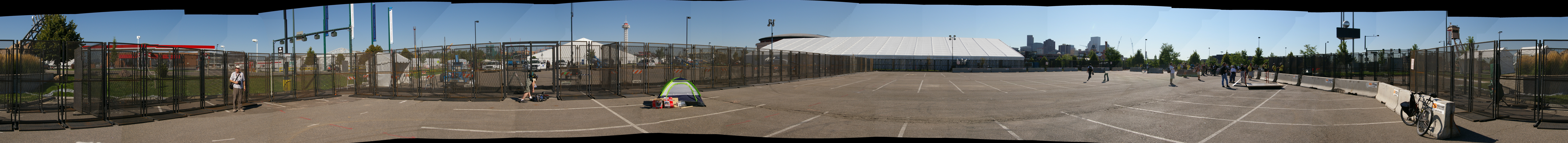
Demonstration zone

The official demonstration zone was unused on Monday afternoon, as the convention opened. The 47,000-square-foot (4,400 m^{2}) fenced area was 700 feet (210 m) from Pepsi Center and delegates could pass from 8 to 200 feet (61 m) from it.

=== Gitmo on the Platte ===
Gitmo on the Platte, was the colloquial name for the "Temporary Arrestee Processing Center," Denver, CO set up to hold mass-arrested protesters during the 2008 Democratic National Convention which was held at the Pepsi Center in Denver from August 25 to August 28, 2008. It was so-named in reference to the conditions at Guantanamo Bay detention camp (aka "Gitmo") and the processing center's location near the South Platte River.

The Denver Police Department claimed the facility was set up to allow those arrested to be processed and released in a more timely manner than they would if they were to be transferred to the Denver County Jail, but faced substantial criticism in mainstream media.

=== Suspected assassination plot ===
On August 24, three men were arrested in the Denver, Colorado area on drugs and weapons charges. Following the arrests of Shawn Robert Adolf, Tharin Robert Gartrell and Nathan Johnson, a possible plot to assassinate Senator Obama surfaced. Authorities later said they had determined the trio posed no credible danger to Obama; U.S. Attorney Troy Eid said, "We're absolutely confident that the meth heads were not a true threat to the candidate, the Democratic National Convention or the people of Colorado."

=== Arrest of an ABC News reporter ===
A reporter from ABC News was arrested as he was photographing a meeting of Democratic senators and VIP donors. The reporter, Asa Eslocker, was arrested by the Denver police and charged with trespassing, interference, and failure to follow a lawful order. The charges were dismissed by the Denver city attorney.

=== Abortion protest sign ===
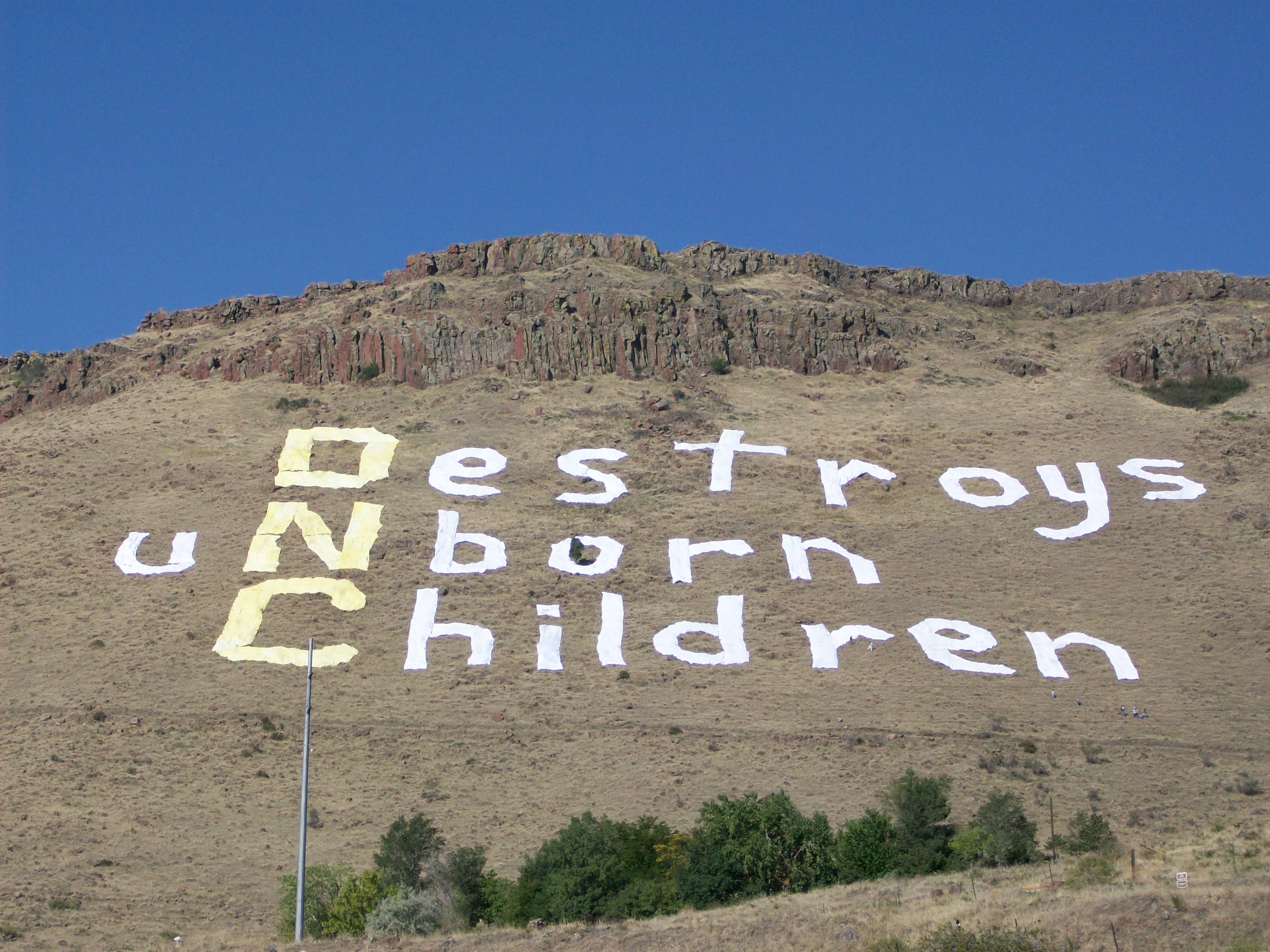
Abortion protest sign on Table Mountain

On August 26, 2008, a group of anti-abortion activists from American Right to Life Action constructed a sign on Table Mountain outside Denver, overlooking the convention. The sign, made of 2400 sheets, read "Destroys / uNborn / Children" in three rows; it was lined up so that "DNC" appeared vertically in a different color. Later that day, the protesters were asked by the Jefferson County Sheriff's Department to remove the sign. No citations were issued, though the group did violate two open space regulations of not applying for a special activity permit and going into a restricted and closed area that is considered sensitive to wildlife.

=== Website ===
Microsoft was chosen as the web content provider for the convention web site, along with Vertigo Software as the developer. The video application developed was based on Microsoft's Silverlight platform and provided high-definition video streams. The choice of technology that required proprietary software from a company with a history of antitrust problems was criticized for both the exclusion of competing platforms by way of Silverlight's proprietary video codec and for requiring visitors to install the software when visiting the site. Although Moonlight is a cross-platform alternative that attempts to be compatible with Silverlight, as of the time of the convention it did not support features found in version 2 which were required. In contrast, the web site for the 2008 Republican National Convention used Adobe Flash streams provided through Ustream.TV and YouTube which are viewable with several applications including the free software cross-platform clone Gnash.

== Depiction in media ==
Ava DuVernay was commissioned by the Smithsonian's National Museum of African American History and Culture to create a film which debuted at the museum's opening on September 24, 2016. This film, August 28: A Day in the Life of a People, tells of six significant events in African-American history that happened on the same date, August 28. The 22-minute film stars Lupita Nyong'o, Don Cheadle, Regina King, David Oyelowo, Angela Bassett, Michael Ealy, Gugu Mbatha-Raw, André Holland and Glynn Turman. Events depicted include, among other things, the night Obama accepted the Democratic nomination for president at the convention.

== See also ==
- 2008 Green National Convention
- 2008 Libertarian National Convention
- 2008 Republican National Convention
- List of superdelegates at the 2008 Democratic National Convention
- Denver 2008 Convention Host Committee
- 2016 Democratic National Convention
- 2008 United States presidential election
- History of the United States Democratic Party
- List of Democratic National Conventions
- United States presidential nominating convention
- Barack Obama 2008 presidential campaign

Preceded by 2004; Boston, Massachusetts	Democratic National Conventions	Succeeded by 2012; Charlotte, North Carolina
