= 2016 Veepstakes =

2016 Veepstakes may refer to:

- 2016 Democratic Party vice presidential candidate selection
- 2016 Republican Party vice presidential candidate selection
