= Knitting club =

Type of social club

A knitting club is a social group in which knitting and crochet enthusiasts gather to do needlework together. They are a feature of the 21st-century revival of hand knitting which began in America and has spread to most of Europe. Despite the name, knitting clubs are not limited to knitting; both crochet-centered and knit-centered clubs are collectively called "knitting clubs." While knitting has never gone away completely, this latest reincarnation is less about the make-do and mend of the 1940s and 1950s, and more about making a statement about individuality and developing a sense of community.

== Purpose ==
Knitting clubs fulfill many purposes: to get together with other knitters, to learn or develop the skills of hand knitting or hand crocheting, a great fun night out. A variation of the knitting club, the Loose Ends Project, even pairs up local crafters with unfinished projects from those who have died or become disabled. Clubs meet in coffee bars, pubs, churches and clubs and members are drawn from all walks of life, including different generations, social classes, and genders. Crafters meet to exchange ideas about projects, chat about their lives, exchange yarns and yarn ideas for projects, or non-craft related activities, similar to a quilting bee. These clubs provide an atmosphere where beginning crafters can seek assistance from more experienced crafters. Due to the rise of the Stitch 'n Bitch books, amigurumi, and numerous other crochet and knit projects, both crafts have grown in popularity, and the demographics of those who practice the craft include younger women and some men.

== Knitting in the UK ==
In the UK there are many websites that help knitters get in touch with their local club. Stitch 'n Bitch clubs take their name from the book by American knitting guru Debbie Stoller, but the term Knit and Natter are also used. There are two national knitting organizations, the UK Hand Knitting Association and Knitting & Crochet Guild.

Rowan Yarns runs clubs which get involved in charitable events. In 2007 the Rowan Knitting clubs spearheaded Knit in Public Day encouraging knitters all around the UK to knit hats for innocent Drinks Smoothie bottles to raise money for Age Concern in the Big Knit. Currently, this is the biggest knitting club event in the UK.

A total of 4,000 people are now part of a Rowan club of some kind, including the existing 8,000 members of Rowan International - the membership subscription to Rowan magazines and gifts.

In January 2008, the knitting club for Imperial College London was set up, aptly named 'Knit Sock' (pun intended).

== Knitting in the US ==
As in the UK, there are many websites, such as Ravelry, Etsy, Pinterest, and Reddit in the United States that help knitters and crocheters, whether skilled or beginners, find local clubs to socialize with fellow knitters or crocheters. Common meeting places are usually local yarn shops, and as in the UK, Stitch 'n Bitch clubs are very popular within the United States.

Knitters meeting in these types of clubs are often women in their twenties and thirties. Many yarn shops offer free help to knitters and crocheters, regardless of whether they are part of the local club or not. Clubs usually have their own groups on Ravelry, where users can search for local yarn shops, knitting clubs, and crochet clubs.

== See also ==
- Sewing circle
- Stitch and Bitch London
- I Knit London
- Crochet hook
- Tunisian crochet
