= I Knit London =

Knitting organisation

I Knit London (often shortened to I Knit or IKL) is a knitting organisation based in London, England, UK, comprising a knitting group, knitting shop and knitting events. I Knit London was formed in December 2005, and is run, by Gerard Allt (b. Liverpool, UK, 9 July 1973) and Craig Carruthers (b. Carlisle, UK, 21 March 1973).

== Knitting group ==
The I Knit London knitting group is a social group meeting in pubs and public spaces mostly in London and occasionally in other venues across the UK and overseas. The first meeting took place at The Beehive pub in Vauxhall, London in December 2005. The club meets every week and takes the same format as many other knitting clubs, knitting groups and knitting circles as a place for knitters and crocheters to come together socially to share and enjoy the craft. Although using their own name, the I Knit London knitting club is one of the many similar groups including Stitch 'n Bitch, Knit & Natter and Knit 2gether, and in the long tradition of community and social craft circles.

Attendance is open to crafters, knitters and crocheters of any age and level of expertise and is free. Notifications of meetings are sent each Monday via an e-newsletter and also posted in the club's Facebook and MySpace groups and on their website.

== Knitting shop ==
Following the knitting club, I Knit London opened a market stall at Old Spitalfields Market operating on Sundays from February 2006 to September 2006. In September 2006 their shop, also called I Knit London, opened in a residential Victorian square in Vauxhall, south London. In March 2008 the shop was closed and relocated to newer premises in the historic market street, Lower Marsh at Waterloo, London.

The shop stocks a range of materials for knitters and crocheters, including varying types of yarn; knitting needles, crochet hooks and accessories; patterns and books. The shop is regularly used as a venue for the knitting club and other events, including classes, film nights, a book group (The Kniterati), late night opening and is the first knitting shop in the UK with a licensed bar selling alcoholic drinks.

The IKL shop is described as 'a club, shop and sanctuary for knitters'.

== Knitting events ==
=== Knit a River ===
Knit A River was a campaign to raise awareness of the 1.1 billion people without access to safe water. Between May 2006 and July 2007 I Knit London joined with WaterAid to mobilise knitters worldwide to create the world's first knitted petition - a huge river of knitted blue squares. The purpose of the project was to create something to show off at WaterAid events as a means to grab public attention and to engage people with their vital work. Over 100,000 squares were created for the project which was used throughout the year at various venues and events.

In May 2007 a large section of the knitted river was carried by demonstrators along London's Albert Embankment and into Parliament Square as a protest to the British government ahead of the G8 summit in Germany. A small section was handing in to the British Prime Minister, Tony Blair, at Number 10 Downing Street. In July 2007 the longest piece of the knitted river was used as part of the Watch This Space festival at the Royal National Theatre in London. Pieces of the project were draped across the terraces of the building, from the top of the Lyttelton fly-tower cascading down into Theatre Square, where WaterAid volunteers were on hand to talk to passers-by and hand out literature about the charity's work.

=== UK Stitch 'n Bitch Day 2007 ===
On 11 November 2007 I Knit London hosted the first UK Stitch 'n Bitch Day, held at the Royal National Hotel in Bloomsbury, London. The show featured a number of workshops, exhibitions, entertainment and a marketplace offering knitting yarns and accessories from a number of independent suppliers. The event was notable for the first UK appearance of Debbie Stoller, author of the Stitch 'n Bitch book series, and the official UK launch of the fourth in that series, Son of Stitch 'n Bitch. Other designers, including Jane Waller, Sally Muir, Joanna Osborne, Jean Moss and Jane Brocket held workshops alongside contributions from Stitch and Bitch London, performance poet Peter Wyton, DJs The Shellac Sisters, Amy Lamé and comedy duo Girl & Dean and a number of charity projects.

=== I Knit Day 2008 and the I Knit Weekender ===
I Knit Day 2008 is the follow-up to UK Stitch 'n Bitch Day, to be held at the Royal Horticultural Halls in Westminster, London on 6 September 2008. The event is similar in style to the previous year with a number of workshops, exhibitions and entertainment. The event played host to best-selling author and blogger Stephanie Pearl-McPhee (aka The Yarn Harlot) making her first UK appearance, and featured contributions from other notable knitwear designers; Sasha Kagan, Erika Knight, Sandra Polley, Jane Sowerby, Jane Waller and Hélène Magnusson. Like its predecessor, the event was sponsored by the online knitting magazine www.knitonthenet.com.

In 2009 the event doubled in size to make the I Knit Weekender. Held on 11 and 12 September 2009 it followed a similar format to 2008's event and hosted an array of designers offering workshops and presentations. These included Alice Starmore, Debbie New, Annie Modesitt and the Guinness World Record Fastest Knitter in the World, Miriam Tegels. The 2009 event also featured a fashion show and live music from 22-piece all-girl choir Gaggle (band). The Weekender is now an annual event with the fourth show taking place in September 2010 at the same venue. Once again knitting designer Alice Starmore will be hosting exclusive workshops to coincide with the republication of two of her most sought after books, Aran Knitting and Fisherman's Sweaters, alongside further appearances by a number of well-known knitwear designers, including Erika Knight, Martin Storey, Debbie Bliss and Susan Crawford.

=== Knitting in Film and Television Awards ===
I Knit London have established the first ever awards for the promotion of knitting in film and television with the light-hearted Knitting in Film and Television Awards (KNIFTAs). The awards were split into four categories; Best Knitting Scene, Funniest Knitting Scene, Best Knitwear and Best Advertisement. There was also an award for the Outstanding Contribution to Knitting in Film and Television which went to Wallace and Gromit and Aardman Animations founder Nick Park. Nominations were submitted by the general public and the nominees were announced on the KNIFTAs website on Monday 2 February. Nominees included Jack McBrayer for 30 Rock, Chi McBride for Pushing Daisies and Jane Wood for her role in the British medical soap Holby City . Winners were announced at the KNIFTA party on Sunday 22 February 2009 at the Crown and Two Chairmen in Soho, London. The winners in two categories were present to pick up their awards: the team from advertising agency McCann Erikson, and actress Jane Wood.

=== The Great British Sheep ===
During summer 2008, a new project was launched to promote and celebrate British wool and British sheep. The Great British Sheep is a large wooden sculpture, standing approximately 5 feet (1.5 m) tall, built and designed by puppet-maker Yvonne Stone. It's wire frame will be covered with knitted and crocheted swatches, squares, ringlets and other shapes which have been made by members of the public at a number of festivals and fetes. All the wool used in the project has been sourced from UK farmers and yarn producers and is entirely made up of 100% British wool. With over 60 breeds native to the UK it is hoped that this unique 'knitted fleece' will contain wool from all of the sheep. The sculpture has been on display at I Knit Day 2008, a knitting show in central London in September 2008 and also as part of The National Theatre's Watch This Space summer festival of outdoor events on London's South Bank on 5 July 2008 On the weekend of 18 July 2008 the project spent three days at the Camp Bestival festival, held at Lulworth Castle in Dorset as part of I Knit London's knitting tent.

=== Knits to Care and Share ===
The first book from the team behind I Knit London was published in December 2008 by David & Charles. The book, by Gerard Allt, includes knitting projects designed for giving to others, or for sharing with loved ones or those in need. An introductory section includes a brief history of IKL and covers in details their Knit a River and The Great British Sheep projects. Knits to Care and Share includes work by a number of designers, including Heather Dixon, Susan Crawford, Sue Hanmore, Eirwen Godfrey, Emily Blades and many others.

=== Other events ===
I Knit London regularly organise and take part in other craft-related events across the UK. They have contributed, or will do so, to festivals, fetes and exhibitions including the Dutch Stitch 'n Bitch Day (2006), Camp Bestival (2008, 2009 and 2010), The Knitting and Stitching Show (2007), Unravel (2006), World Wide Knit in Public Day (2006 to present), the Institute For Figuring's Hyperbolic Crochet Coral Reef (2009) as well as one-off craft events and booksignings held at the IKL shop.
