= Sewing circle =

Regular gathering of people to sew together

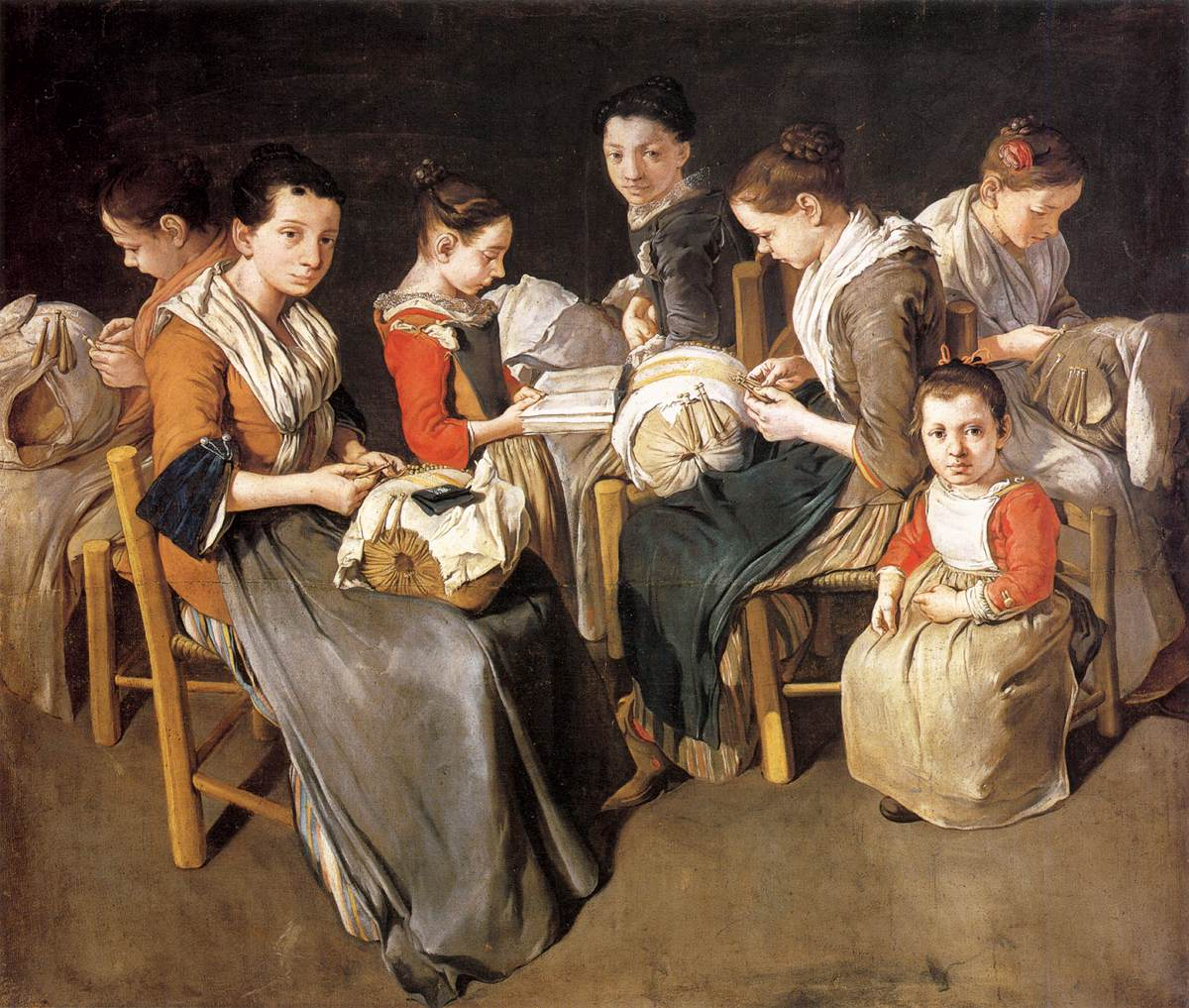
Giacomo Ceruti, Women Working on Pillow Lace (1720s)

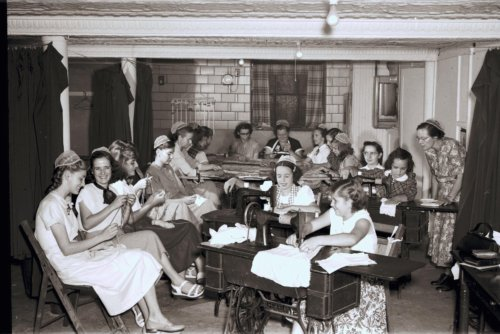
The Junior Sewing Circle of the North Lima Mennonite Congregation, North Lima, Ohio, 1952

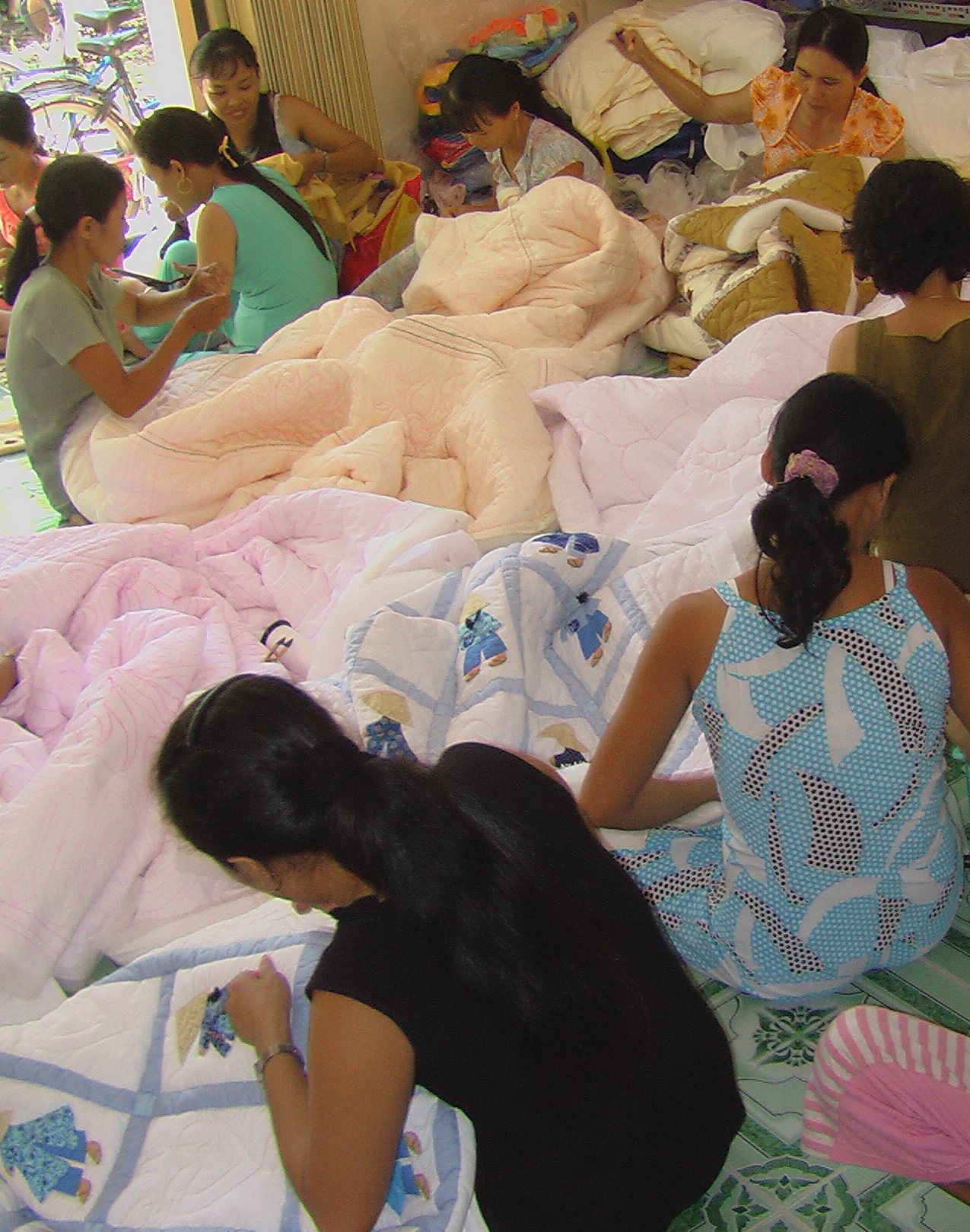
Group working on the Mekong quilts project in Vietnam (2009)

A sewing circle is a group of people who meet regularly for the purpose of sewing, often for charitable causes.

== Application to sewing ==
Sewing circle participants, usually women, typically meet regularly for the purpose of sewing. They often also support charitable causes while chatting, gossiping or discussing.

For example, in ante-bellum America, local anti-slavery or missionary "sewing circles were complementary, not competing, organisations that allowed [women] to act on their concern for creating a more just and moral society". Other examples of sewing circles include the Fragment Society, the Mennonite Sewing Circle, and those organized by RMS Titanic survivor Emily Goldsmith aboard the rescue ship RMS Carpathia: Goldsmith, "a talented seamstress, organized sewing circles to make garments out of cloth and blankets for those passengers dressed in nightclothes when they entered the lifeboats."

During World War II, sewing circles were formed to help people "make do and mend" in response to rationing in the United Kingdom. The Women's Voluntary Services organized sewing circles and classes during the war. Elizabeth II hosted sewing circles twice a week, with both palace staff and aristocrats attending.

Apart from charitable purposes, contemporary sewing circles may be formed into organisations on a national level, such as the Guilds in Australia and America "for people who regard sewing as a creative and rewarding activity".

=== "Chew the rag" ===
It has been speculated that the phrase "chew the rag" could be related to gossiping while working in a sewing circle.

== See also ==
- Golden Needle Sewing School
- Knitting clubs
- Quilting bee
- Revolutionary Knitting Circle
- Stitch 'n Bitch
- Dorcas Society
