= Cornelia Mee =

British textile designer

- Born: Cornelia Austin; 1815; Bath, Somerset, England
- Died: 1875 (aged 59–60); London, England
- Other name: Mrs. Mee
- Occupations: Textile designer, author

Cornelia Mee (nee Austin, 23 April 1815 – 1875), was a British knitting and crochet pattern designer and writer.

== Early life ==
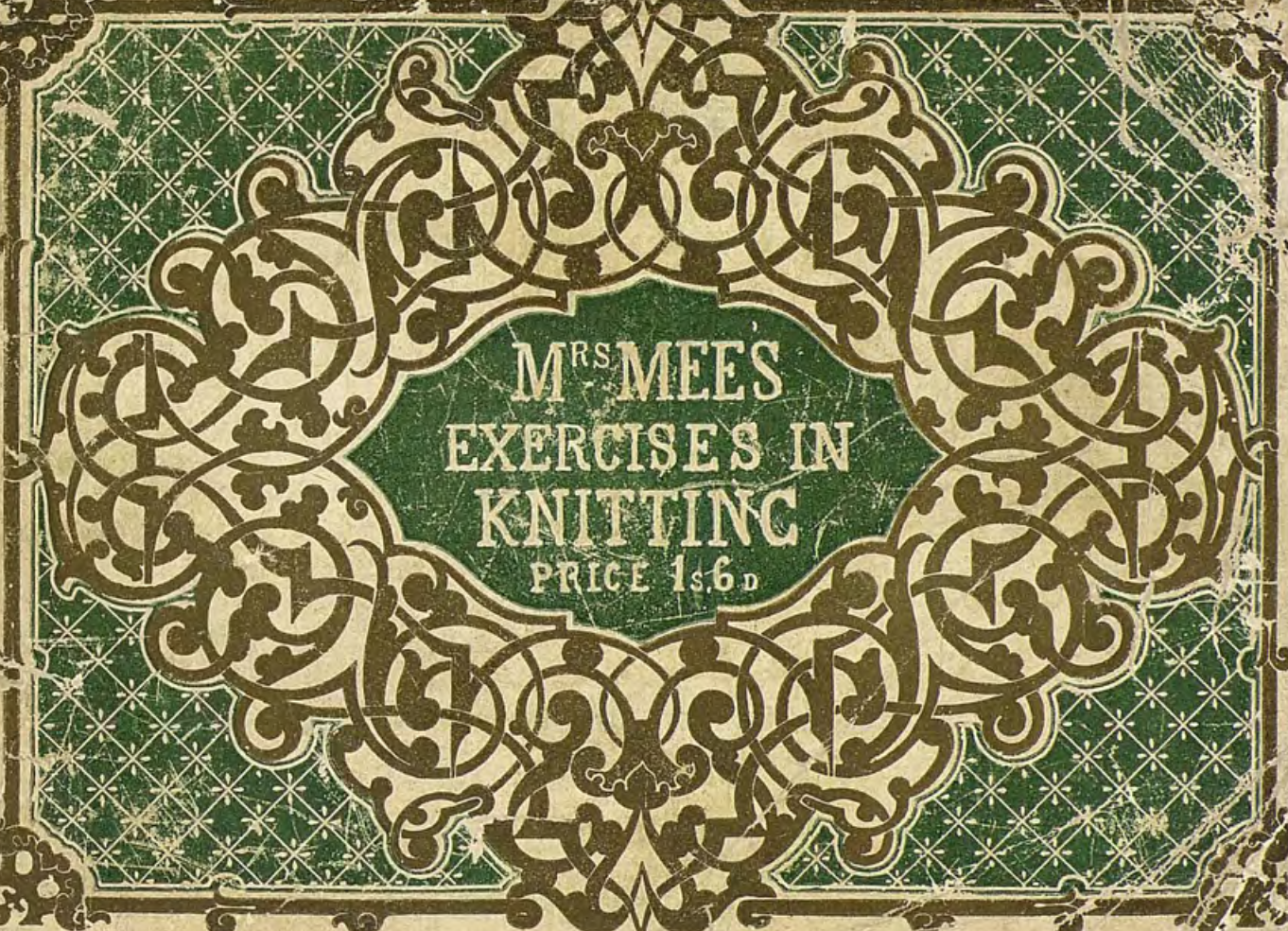
The 1847 cover of Cornelia Mee's Mrs. Mee's Exercises in Knitting.

Cornelia Austin was born in Bath in 1815, the daughter of Thomas Austin and Sarah Shubert. Her father was a haberdasher, bookseller, and undertaker..

== Career ==
Mee was one of the women who claimed to have invented crochet, and was a major figure in the popularization of various needlecrafts in the nineteenth century. She is credited with publishing the first original English-language instructions for Tunisian crochet, which she called "Crochet a la Tricoter", or "Crochet on a Knitting Needle."

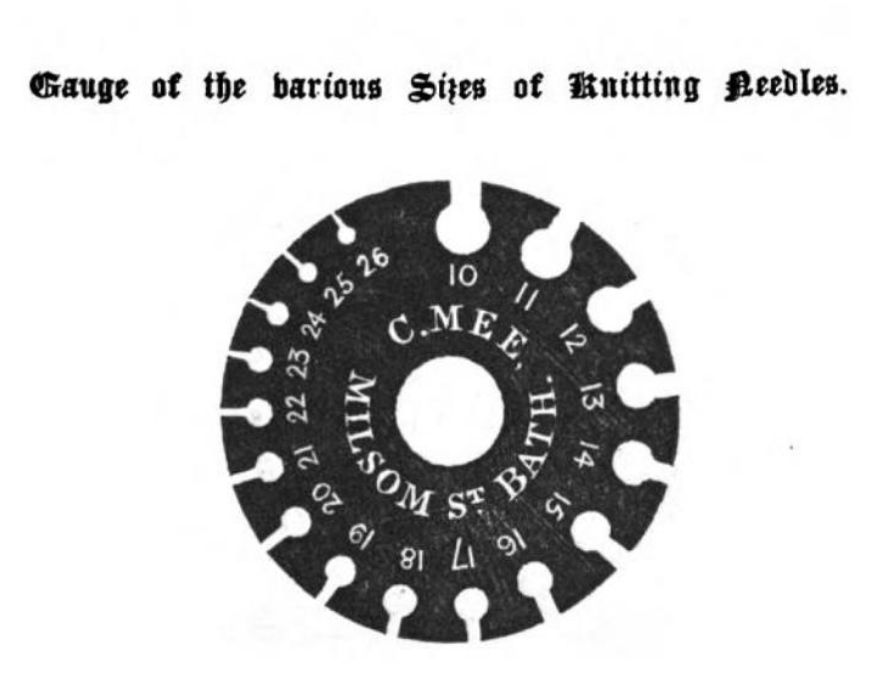
A gauge of the various sizes of knitting needles, by Cornelia Mee (from A Manual of Knitting, Netting, and Crochet Work, 1842).

Mee wrote illustrated books and pamphlets of knitting and crochet patterns and instructions, some with her younger sister Mary Battle Austin, including Mee's Companion to the Worktable (1844), Crochet Explained and Illustrated (1846), Mrs. Mee's Exercises in Knitting (1846), Crochet Collars (1846), Crochet Doilies and Edgings (1846), Crochet Couvrettes and Collars (1847), The Manual of Needlework (1854), Manual of Knitting, Beautifully Illustrated (1860) The Queen's Winter Knitting Book (1862), Tatting, or Frivolité (1862), and First Series of the Knitter's Companion (1867).

Mee and her sister also edited a magazine, The Worktable, and ran a wool shop in Bath. Her patterns were often used for making handcrafts to sell at charity fundraising events. She contributed an embroidered banner and other items displaying "much vigour and boldness" to the Great Exhibition at The Crystal Palace in 1851.

== Personal life ==
Cornelia Austin married widower Charles Mee in 1837. She died in 1875, aged 60 years. Designs by Cornelia Mee are still worked by knitters and crocheters today, and there is a "Cornelia Mee" page on Ravelry to share those projects in that social network.

== Works ==
Exercises in knitting (1847)
