= Françoise Dupont =

French militant

Françoise Dupont (fl. 1796), was a French militant Jacobin active during the French Revolution. She was married to the soldier Barbant (Note: Her husband's name may have been Barbant, Barbaux, or Barbaut.) and worked as a washerwoman.

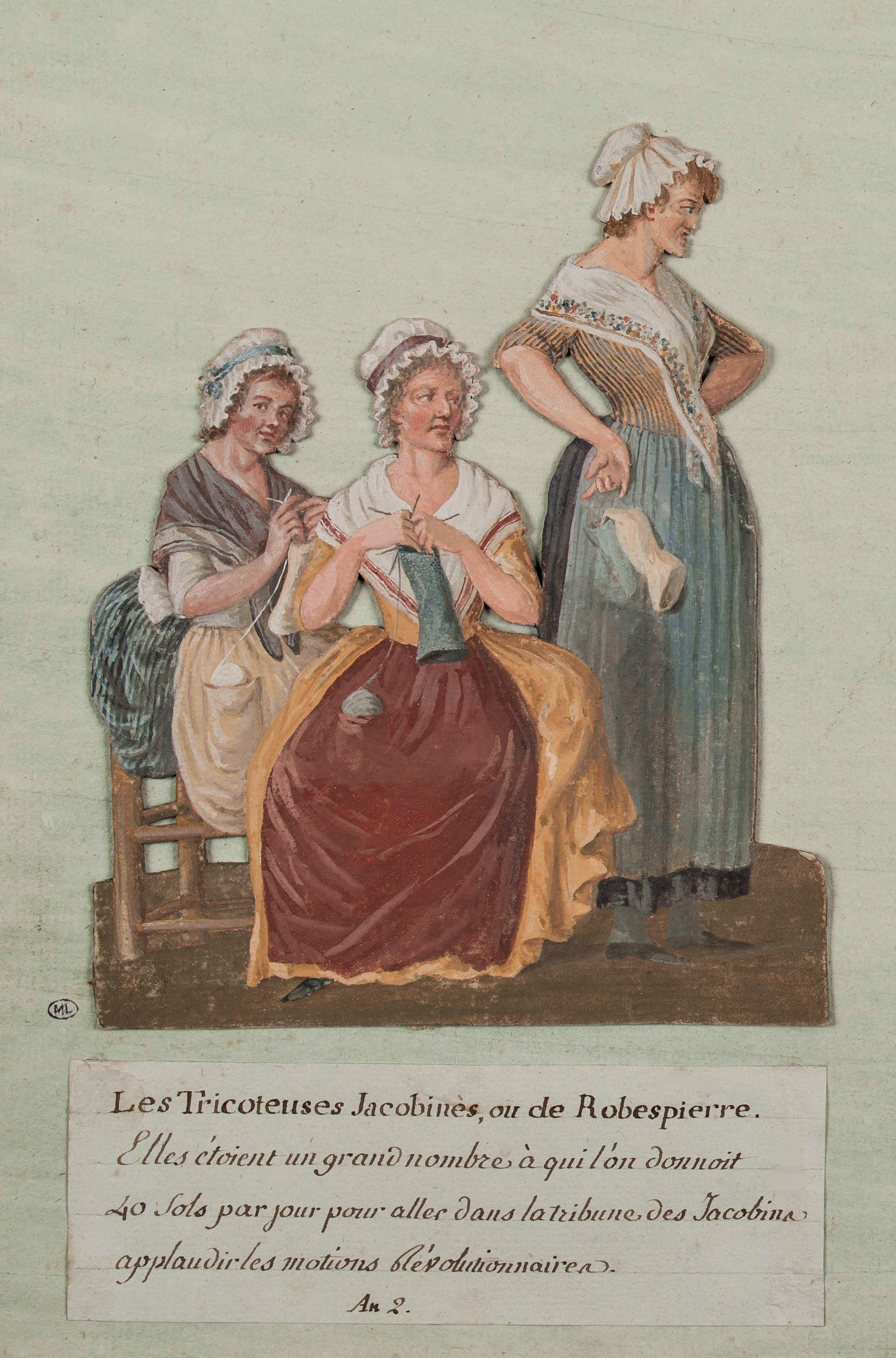
Illustration depicting women like Dupont (tricoteuse), who watched executions while knitting.

She participated in the persecution of political dissidents during the Reign of Terror and was an informer who reported counter-revolutionaries to the Committee of Public Safety, resulting in their arrest. She bragged about directly causing at least thirty-five people to be executed by guillotine and is quoted as saying she'd support her best friend being guillotined "if he did not think like a true Jacobin." In one case, she posed as a patient to spy on the nuns at the Maison de Hospitalieres and reported them for counter-revolutionary activity. She has been identified as one of the tricoteuse, a group of women who supported the Jacobins and watched executions of political prisoners while knitting.

After the fall of Robespierre, she participated in the Lagrelet conspiracy, when she encouraged and acted as the leader of starving women protestors to riot against the government. She was searched for by the authorities as one of the instigators but avoided arrest by going into hiding. She benefited from the amnesty of 1796.
