= Loose Ends =

Loose Ends may refer to:

== Music ==
- Loose Ends (RJD2 album)
- Loose Ends (Jimi Hendrix album), 1974
- Loose Ends (EP), a 2008 EP by Rachael Yamagata
- Loose Ends (band), a British R&B group
- "Loose Ends", a song by Bruce Springsteen from Tracks
- "Loose Ends", a song by Imogen Heap from Speak for Yourself
- Loose Ends, a music production company founded by Pete Waterman

== Other media ==
- Loose Ends (radio programme), a British radio programme
- "Loose Ends" (Burn Notice), a 2007 television episode
- "Loose Ends" (Doctors), a 2003 television episode
- "Loose Ends" (Justified), a 2012 television episode
- "Loose Ends" (Twenty Twelve), a 2012 television episode
- Loose Ends (novel), a 2001 novel based on the television series Roswell
- Loose Ends, a novella by Paul Levinson
- Loose Ends (1930 film), a film starring Owen Nares
- Loose Ends (1975 film), a film by David Burton Morris
- Loose Ends, a play by Michael Weller

== See also ==
- Loose Ends Project, a US non-profit
