= Rkc =

RKC may refer to:

- RKC Waalwijk, an association football team in the Netherlands
- Rajkumar College, Rajkot, a K-12 school in the city of Rajkot, India
- Rajkumar College, Raipur, a K-12 school in the city of Rajpur, India
- Montague Airport (California) in Montague, California, United States
- Kochi Broadcasting, a Japanese commercial broadcaster
- Roman Key Card Blackwood, a bridge bidding convention; see Blackwood convention
- Royal Kennel Club, commonly referred to as The Kennel Club
- Revolutionary Knitting Circle, an activist group.
