= Sew Fast Sew Easy =

American corporation based in New York City

Sew Fast/Sew Easy, Inc.
- Company type: Private
- Founded: June 23, 1993
- Founder: Elissa K. Meyrich
- Defunct: December 10, 2012
- Fate: closed
- Headquarters: New York, NY
- Area served: New York City
- Products: Online Video Learning, Sewing Patterns, Sewing Machines, Sewing, Knitting, Crochet Education and Products
- Website: sewfastseweasy.com

Sew Fast Sew Easy was a corporation based in the Garment District in New York City, that is best known for sewing classes, sewing patterns and sewing books. It was founded in 1991 by Elissa K. Meyrich, a designer in New York City's garment district for over 26 years, an instructor at Parsons School of Design, and an author and contributing writer to sewing publications. Sew Fast Sew Easy classes were part of a resurgence in traditional home economics enabled by networked technologies including Internet chat groups and digitally-adjustable patterns.

== History ==
In 1997, the company created NYC's first Stitch and Bitch group.

In 1998, the company started an Internet guestbook, the Stitch and Bitch Cafe.

In 1999, knitting book author Debbie Stoller established a knitting group called "Stich ‘n Bitch" [sic] in the East Village of Manhattan.

A controversy around rights to the phrase "Stitch and Bitch" then arose. In 2002, Sew Fast Sew Easy registered a service mark designation for "Stitch & Bitch Café".

In 2005, many sellers on Café Press who created goods using related phrases received cease and desist letters on behalf of Sew Fast Sew Easy, which had filed for a "Stitch and Bitch" trademark related to sewing goods. The website freetostitchfreetobitch.com was formed shortly thereafter, urging crafters to boycott and protest Sew Fast Sew Easy.

Stoller filed a petition to cancel Sew Fast Sew Easy's trademark application, arguing that the term had been in use previous to 1998. The two parties settled in 2008.

In December 2012, Sew Fast Sew Easy ceased operations.

== Brands ==
Brands marketed by Sew Fast/Sew Easy included:

- Sew Fast Sew Easy sewing classes, books, and patterns.
- Stitch & Bitch, and Stitch & Bitch Cafe sewing and knitting products.

== Company timeline ==
- 1991 – Opened the first Sew Fast Sew Easy classes held in a small studio in New York City.
- 1992 – Sew Fast Sew Easy opens a full service sewing center with knitting and crochet classes, sewing notions, patterns and machines.
- 1994 – New York Newsday features an article on Sew Fast Sew Easy entitled "It's SEW Soothing".
- 1995 – Sew Fast Sew Easy creates its first computer fit made-to-measure sewing patterns.
- 1996 – The New York Post features an article in which the classes by Sew Fast Sew Easy are described as being "on the cutting edge".
- 1997 – The New York Times publishes an article discussing Sew Fast Sew Easy's computer fit made-to-measure patterns. Burda Mode magazine labels Elissa Meyrich a "PowerFrau" (powerhouse). The New York Times features the company in an article. Sew Fast Sew Easy creates its first Stitch and Bitch Nights in New York City.
- 1998 – The online forum, Stitch & Bitch Café, along with the Sew Fast Sew Easy website are started. Magnetic seam guides are made to support the Stitch & Bitch Café brand and incorporated into manuals and instructions. How to be your own Designer first airs on Manhattan Neighborhood Network, Public-access television.
- 1999 – Sewing trade magazine, Round Bobbin, titles Sew Fast Sew Easy as the pioneer of hip sewing as "Lone Cowgirl on the Open Prairie" while MSN Sidewalk lists its classes in a City Survival Guide. CNN and The New York Times feature Sew Fast Sew Easy's voodoo doll making classes.
- 2001 – First release of its online video learning series.
- 2002 – Best of New York lists company as "Tailor Made". Sew Fast Sew Easy: All You Need to Know When You Start to Sew by Elissa K. Meyrich is published by St. Martin's Press.
- 2003 – The New York Historical Society features Sew Fast Sew Easy patterns in exhibit.
- 2004 – Stitch & Bitch product line expanded to include knitting.
- 2005 – Sew Fast Sew Easy featured in Teen Vogue.
- 2006 – RIP IT!: How to Deconstruct and Reconstruct the Clothes of Your Dreams by Elissa K. Meyrich is published by Simon & Schuster and featured in Elle Girl and Readymade magazines and on Venuszine.com.
- 2007 – Company expands and moves to a West 35th street location. In June 2007, Stitch & Bitch Café digital learning center, has a grand opening. CNBC World News includes the company in its showcase of the modern face of sewing and technology. Stitch & Bitch magnetic seam guide featured in Craft Magazine. Series of t-shirts offered under the Stitch & Bitch Café brand.
- 2008 – Sew Fast Sew Easy: Sew On by Elissa K. Meyrich is published by St. Martin's Press with former Vice President Gregory Garvin on the cover. Teacher Kenley Collins goes to Fashion Week as a finalist on Project Runway.
