= Chew the fat =

English-language colloquialism

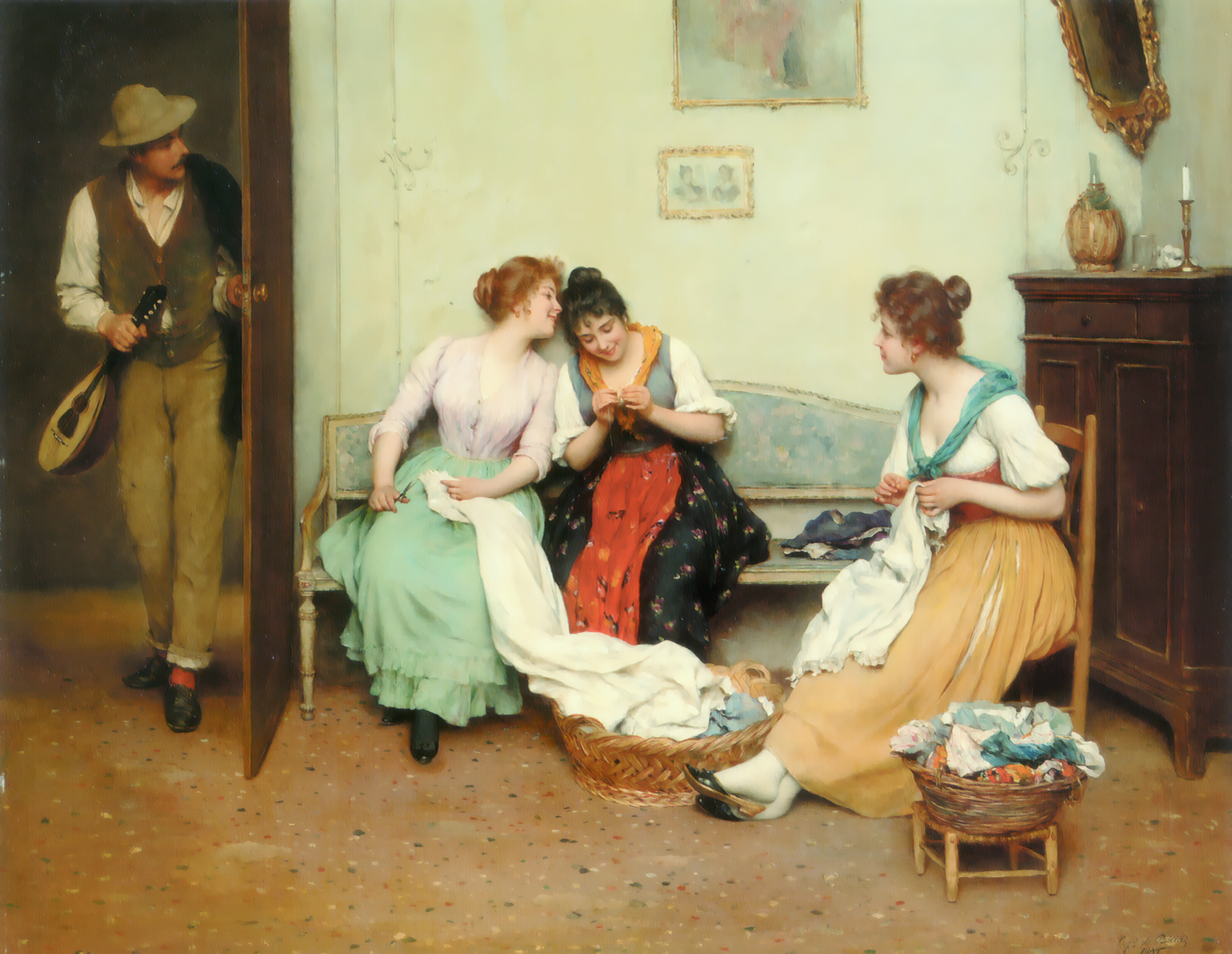
It is speculated that the phrase may come from women chatting while sewing.

"Chewing the fat" or "chew the rags" are English expressions for gossiping or making friendly small talk, or a long and informal conversation with someone.

== Origin ==
=== Chew the fat ===
Although some sources attribute the phrase "chew the fat" to sailors, who during a period of resting and conversing, or while working together, would chew on salt-hardened fat, there are no reliable historical recordings of this practice. There is even a suggestion the phrase derives from a practice by North American Indians or Inuit of chewing animal hides during their spare time, and even of British farmers chewing on cooked pork, but again, there remains no evidence supporting these claims, and this would require accepting a great deal of uncertainty in connecting the phrase from nautical origins to its modern metaphorical use.

There are also claims the phrase is synonymous with the action of chewing on fat, or simply an allusion to the movement of the mouth during chewing. Noting that fried fat is appealing in taste, it was regarded as a treat that someone could chew on for as long as possible to gain the most out of it.

The Oxford English Dictionary's earliest citation for "Chew the fat" is from 1885 in a book by J Brunlees Patterson called Life in the Ranks of the British Army in India. He implied it was a kind of general grumbling and bending of the ears of junior officers to stave off boredom, a typical part of army life. Patterson also uses "chew the rag" in the same sentence he used "chew the fat", but it is not the oldest occurrence of that phrase. Prior to the adoption of metallic cartridges, most ammunition was composed of powder and a ball wrapped in paper or cloth soaked in animal fat, which was bitten open during musket drill. Soldiers were known to chew on these ends to pass the time and reduce nerves, and in some cases to stave off cravings for chewing tobacco. Though long-since replaced by 1885, the idea of biting or chewing on fat-soaked rag ends may well have entered military parlance in this fashion prior to Patterson's recording.

=== Chew the rag ===
Appearing first in print from 1875 in "Random House Historical Dictionary of American Slang", the excerpt reads:

"Gents, I could chew the rag hours on end, just spilling out the words and never know no more than a Billy-Bennett-goat what I’d been saying."

There is speculation this phrase relates to cloth, when ladies would work in "sewing circles", or that women may have gossiped while quilting.

=== Shared use ===
They first appeared synonymously as early as 1885, in J. Brunlees Patterson's "Life in the ranks of the British army in India and on board a troopship", which listed the terms in succession:

"..whistling, singing, arguing the point, chewing the rag, or fat, or other voluble and noisy inflictions, such as the screeching and gabbling of parrots and yelping of canines.."

It was used as a way to describe complaining or grumbling, typically by the military.

== Modern usage ==
It was not until 1907 the phrase "chew the fat" was used to express partaking in idle conversation, for a friendly talk, or a gossip session. It has also been used as a way to define telling tall tales.

In ham radio, extended conversation, as opposed to just exchanging basic information (name, location, equipment), is called "ragchewing".

Chewin' the Fat was the title of a Scottish comedy sketch show, starring Ford Kiernan, Greg Hemphill and Karen Dunbar. Chewin' the Fat first started as a radio series on BBC Radio Scotland.

Chew-The-Fat.com is a UK-based website (now moved to chew-the-fat.org.uk) hosting a web forum, described as "The chat forum your mother warned you about", devoted to chat, gossip, and humorous banter and cartoons.

Chew The Fat is a food and travel podcast, presented and produced by GastroGays (Russell Alford and Patrick Hanlon), which focuses on food personalities and producers across Ireland and the UK, including Nigella Lawson, Donal Skehan and Niamh Kavanagh.

== Email hoax ==
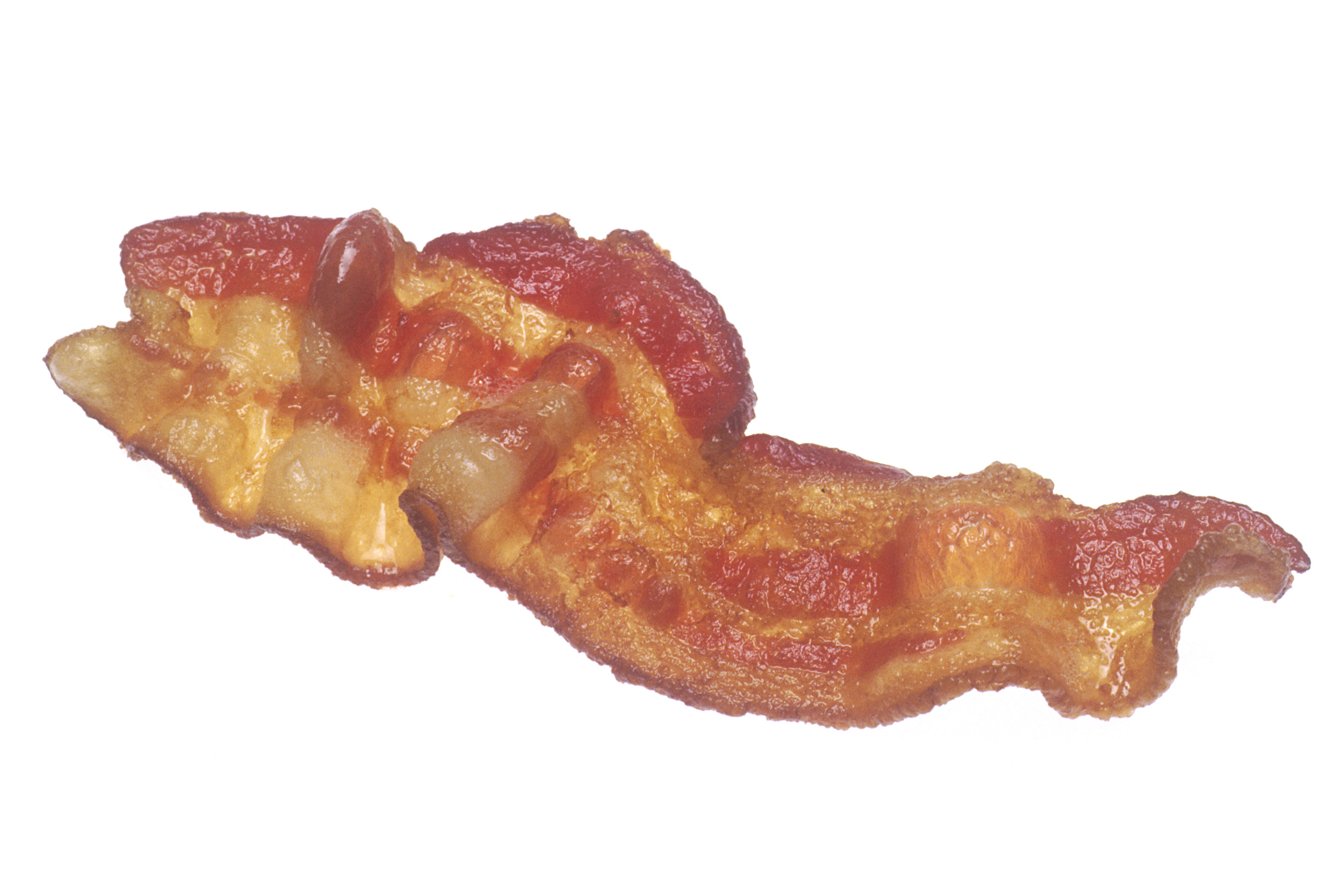

In 1999, in a widespread hoax called "Life in the 1500s", false information was circulated through email regarding "chew the fat". Among offering explanations for many phrases, the email stated:

"When company came over, they would bring out some bacon and hang it to show it off. It was a sign of wealth and that a man 'could really bring home the bacon.' They would cut off a little to share with guests and would all sit around and 'chew the fat.' "

Notably, Karl Pilkington propagated this story during episode eight of the second series of The Ricky Gervais Show on XFM London.

The false email spurred a reexamination of popularly sourced etymologies of many folk phrases and idioms. Although it has been widely accepted as accurate, this misinformation has since been dispelled.
