= World Wide Knit in Public Day =

Annual event

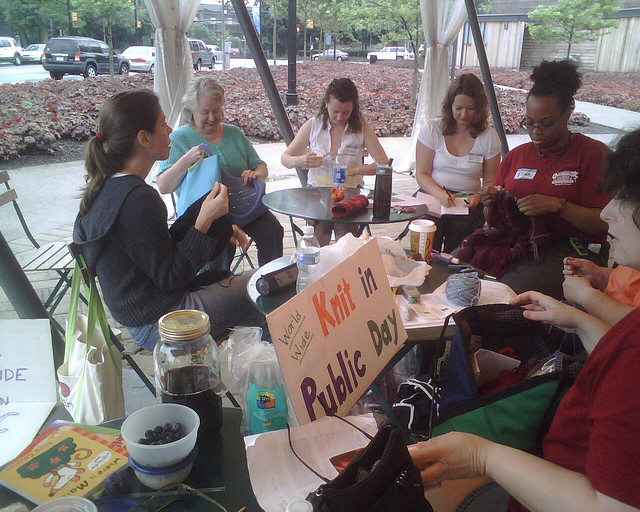
Participants in the 2008 World Wide Knit in Public Day in Schenley Plaza, Pittsburgh

World Wide Knit in Public Day was started in 2005 by Danielle Landes and takes place on the second Saturday of June each year. It began as a way for knitters to come together and enjoy each other's company.

Knit in Public Day is the largest knitter run event in the world. Each local event is put together by a volunteer or a group of volunteers. They bring their own fresh ideas into planning where the event should be held, and what people would like to do.

In the past, some people have used this event as a means to show the general public that "not only grannies knit". Knit in Public Day is about showing the general public that knitting can be a community activity in a very distinct way. In some places, there are many different knitting groups that never interact with each other, except on Knit in Public Day when they come together in one place, making them hard to miss.

In 2005, there were about 25 local events around the world. In 2006, there were about 70 local events, and in 2007, there were almost 200.

Over the years there have been local events in Australia, China, Serbia, England, Finland, France, Ireland, Norway, Poland, Slovenia, South Africa, Sweden, United States, Canada, and Germany.

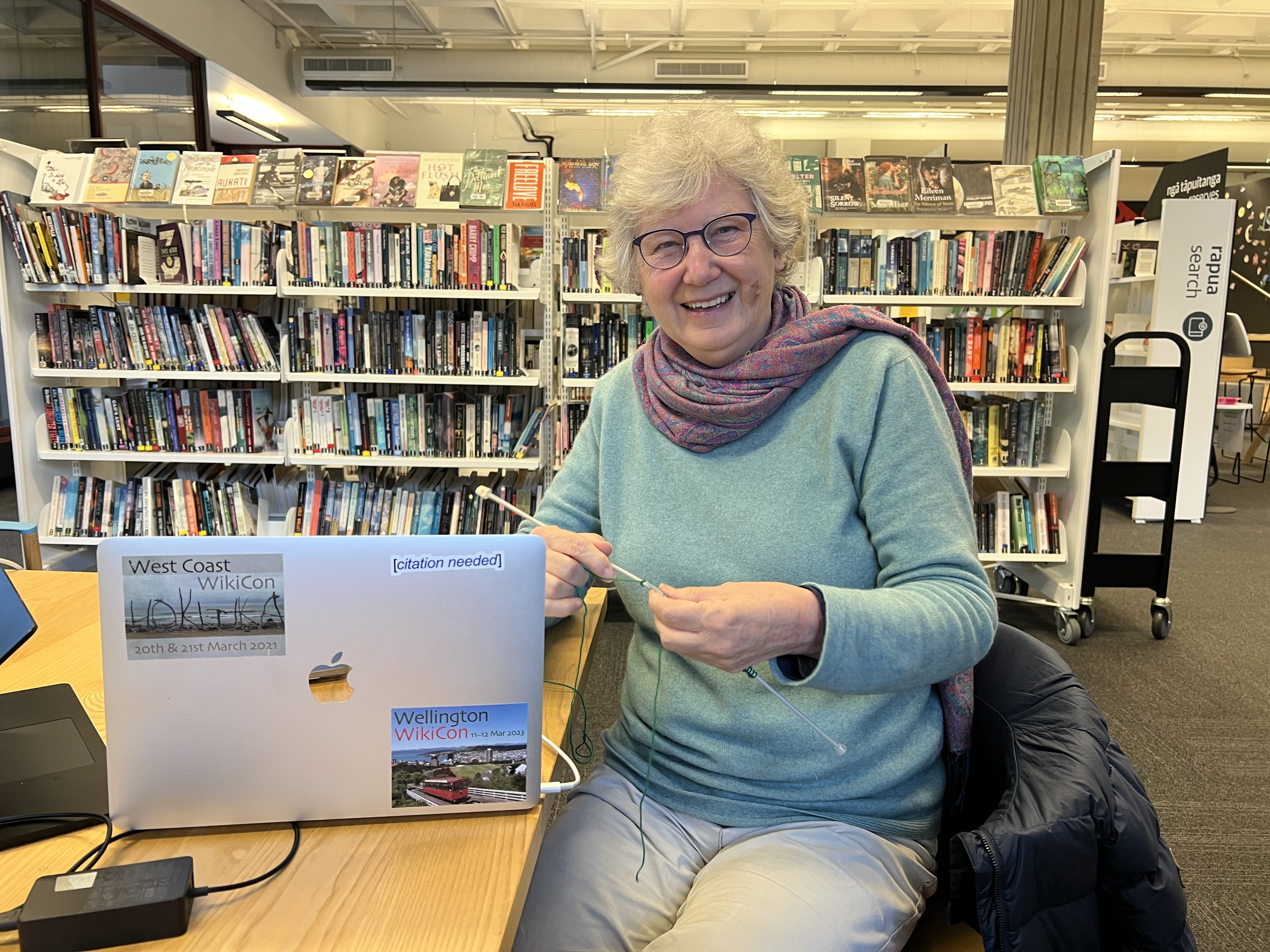
Wikipedia editor knitting on Worldwide Knit in Public Day

== See also ==
- I Knit London
- Stitch and Bitch London
