= Alice Starmore =

British knitter

Alice Starmore (née Alice Matheson) is a professional needleworker, knitting designer, photographer and writer, born in Stornoway, Western Isles, Scotland. As an author she is best known for her widely-read Alice Starmore's Book of Fair Isle Knitting, a guide to the complex technique of knitting pullovers and other items using a palette of five colours, on which she is an expert. Her photographic work is devoted to the natural world, especially birds and insects.

== Life and career ==
Growing up in a traditional Scottish fishing community with Gaelic as her native language, Starmore learned knitting and created her own designs by the age of five. In 1975 she produced a knitwear collection which was sold in London boutiques.

In 1978, Starmore was awarded a Winston Churchill Fellowship, under which she travelled to Norway, Sweden and Finland to study their textile traditions. She is an authority on Celtic and Fair Isle design and technique through her books, as well as articles for Threads and Vogue Knitting magazines. She markets her own lines of threads and yarn.

In 1991 Starmore founded Windfall Press, which began with knitting titles and moved to Scottish Gaelic.

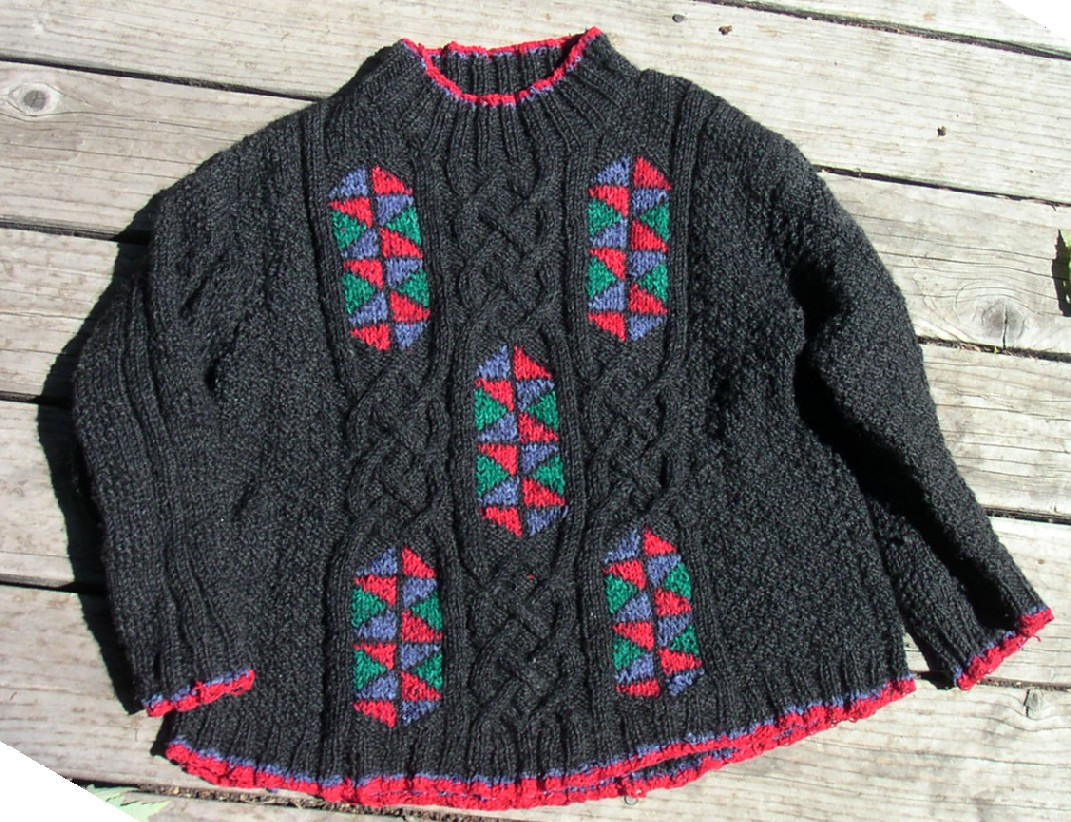
A design by Alice Starmore, Stained Glass Sweater, based on Aran sweater patterns.

Starmore put on an art exhibition called "Mamba" at An Lanntair, Stornoway, Isle of Lewis during Summer 2008. She has appeared at a number of textile and knitting events, including the Dutch Stitch 'n' Bitch Day (Rotterdam, 2006) and I Knit London's Weekender (September 2009).

Starmore photographs the natural world, particularly birds and insects, and she contributes to publications of the British Dragonfly Society. She is regarded as an authority on Scottish moorland habitats, and is employed by the Royal Society for the Protection of Birds (RSPB) as their Education Officer for the Isles of Lewis and Harris.

Her daughter Jade is a professional needleworker and artist, and has published her own books.

== Alice Starmore's Book of Fair Isle Knitting ==
Starmore is best known for her book on Fair Isle knitting, a traditional knitting technique used to create complex patterns with multiple, typically up to five, colours. Sarah E. White, on About.com, writes that Starmore's Book of Fair Isle Knitting "makes my head hurt in a good way." The Knitters Bookshelf editor writes of the book that "Alice Starmore's incomparable unveiling of the art of Fair Isle knitting is not just the most complete resource on the subject that is available, but also a journey into the world of color and fiber and design that both inspires and enlightens." Alessandro De Luca of Yarns of Italy writes that it is a book he can read, not as a book of ready to use patterns but a book which explains the history, theory and techniques involved. He writes "If you've ever wanted to create fair isle patterns that are uniquely your own, this is the must-have book. If you've ever wondered about knitting history, this is the book. And if you've ever wondered about steeking, carrying yarn in colorwork, or combining colors in a pattern, this is the book." Michael Stillman, on AE Monthly, notes that while knitting books no longer dominate the top ten most sought after old books where once they used to, Starmore's Tudor Roses is still (2010) in 10th place.

== Published works ==
- Starmore, Alice. Aran Knitting (Interweave Press US, 1997. Expanded edition Dover US 2010).
- Starmore, Alice. Scandinavian Knitwear (Bell & Hyman UK, 1981)
- Starmore, Alice. Knitting from the British Islands (Bell & Hyman UK, 1982)
- Starmore, Alice. Children's Knitting From Many Lands, (Bell & Hyman UK, St. Martin's Press US, 1983)
- Starmore, Alice. Alice Starmore's Book of Fair Isle Knitting (Taunton Press US, Blandford Books UK, 1988) (Also published as: The Fair Isle Knitting Handbook, Blandford Press UK, 1990)
- Starmore, Alice. Sweaters For Men (Ballantine Books US, Pavilion Books UK, 1988)
- Starmore, Alice. The Celtic Collection (Anaya, UK, Trafalgar Square US, 1992)
- Starmore, Alice. Charts for Colour Knitting (Windfall Press, UK], 1992, expanded edition Dover US 2011)
- Starmore, Alice. Fishermen's Sweaters (Anaya UK, Trafalgar Square US, 1993) (Also translated into Swedish and published as: Fiskar-Tröjor, Raben Prisma, Stockholm 1995)
- Starmore, Alice. Celtic Needlepoint (Anaya UK, Trafalgar Square US, 1994)
- Starmore, Alice. In The Hebrides (Windfall Press US, 1995)
- Starmore, Alice. Stillwater (Windfall Press US, 1996)
- Starmore, Alice. Pacific Coast Highway (Windfall Press US, 1997)
- Starmore, Alice. Tudor Roses (Windfall Press US, 1998, expanded edition Calla Editions, 2013)
- Starmore, Alice and Jade Starmore. The Children's Collection (Interweave Press US, 2000)
- Starmore, Alice. Road Movies Volume 1 (Windfall Press UK, 2008)
- Starmore, Alice. Glamourie (Calla Editions, 2018)
