= Jean-Baptiste Lesueur (painter) =

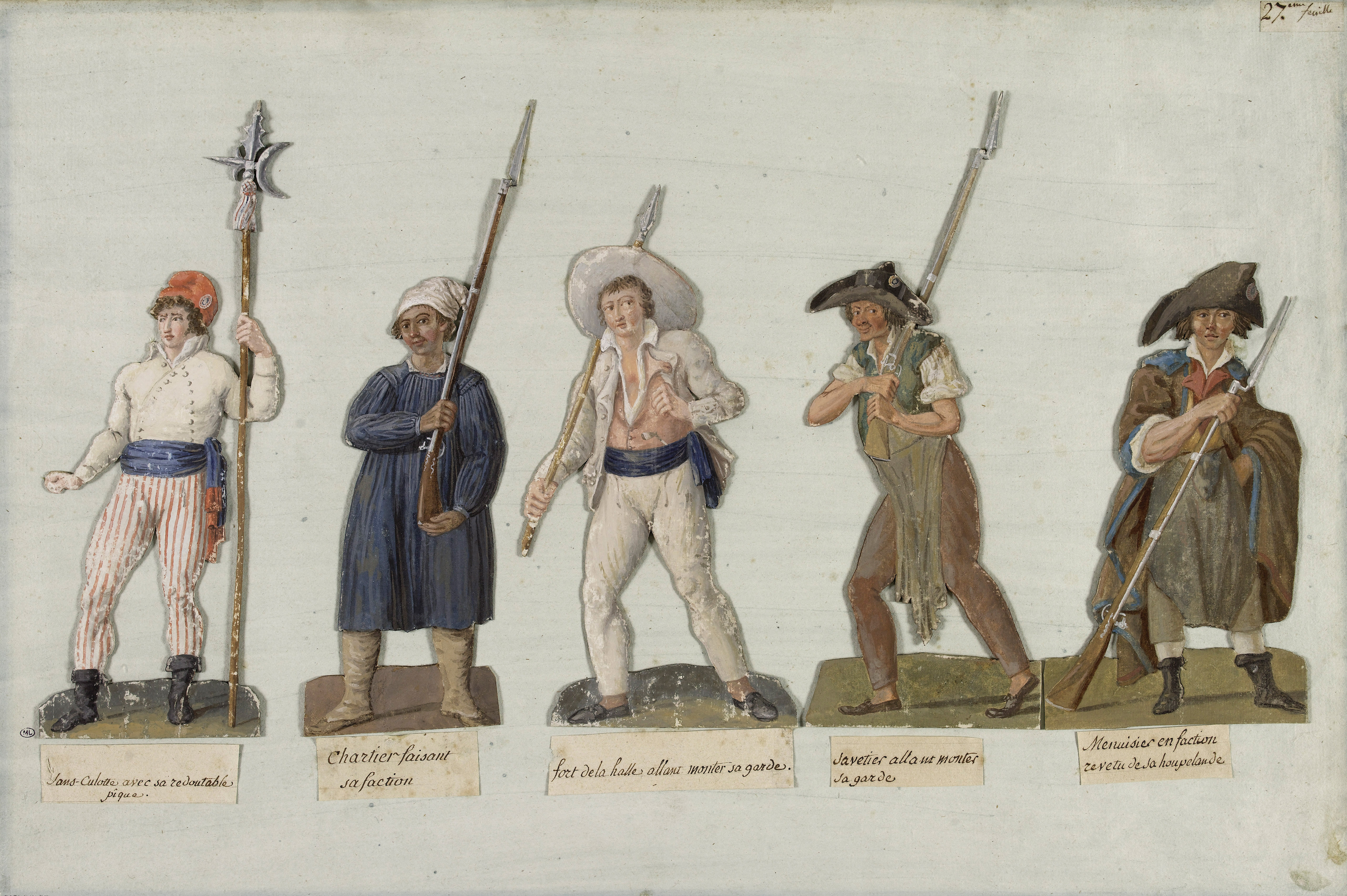
The Sans-Culottes in arms

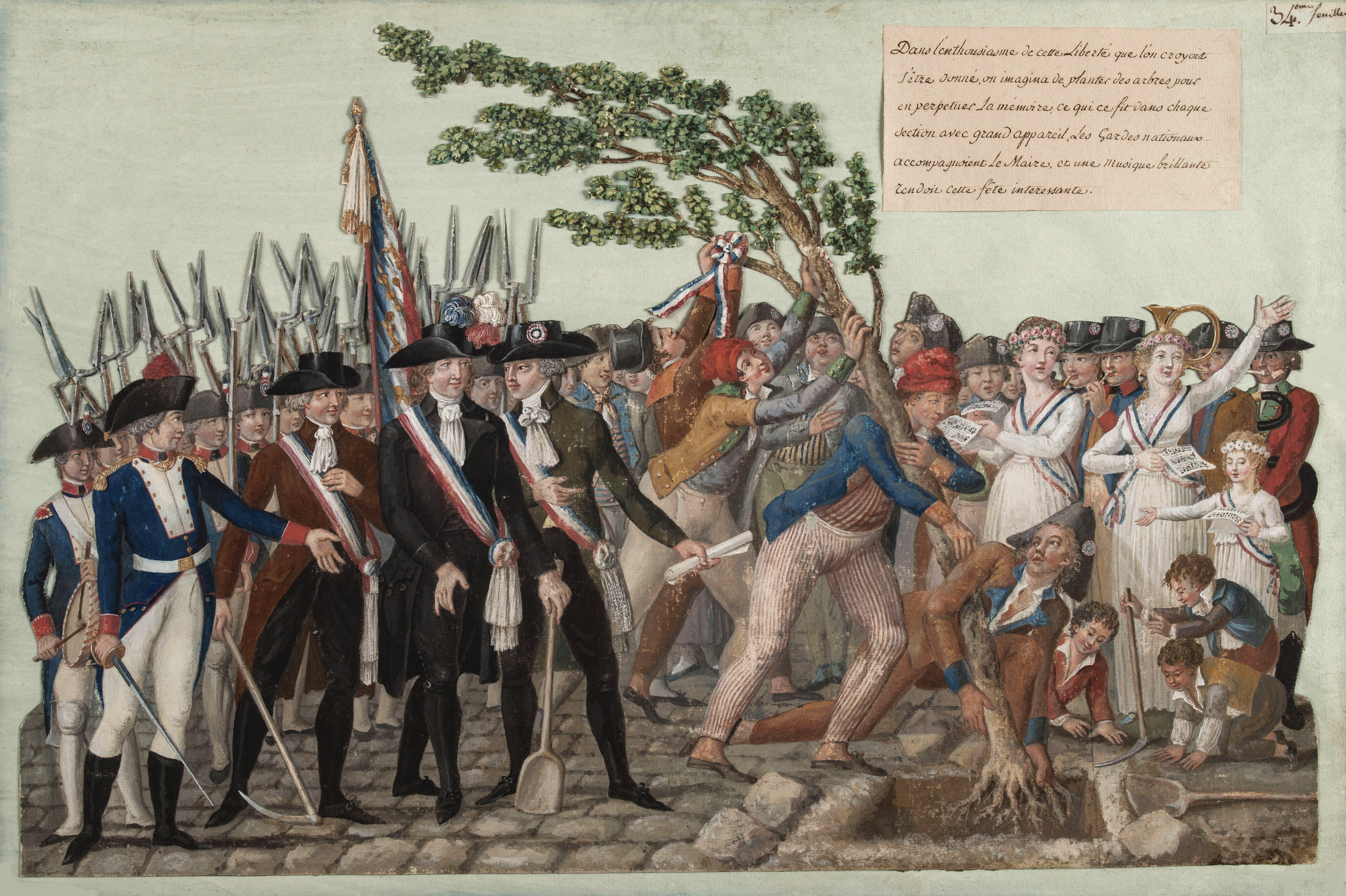
Planting of the Liberty Tree, c. 1792

Jean-Baptiste Denis Marie Lesueur (c. 1749, in Paris – 6 May 1826, in Plailly) was a French painter, to whom is attributed a series of gouaches on the French Revolution and the Napoleonic Era.

== Life and work ==
The first official record of the Lesueur family is from 1777, when they owned a house in Paris. Jean-Baptiste lived there with what were probably two brothers and a sister; all unmarried. At the beginning of the Revolution, he was a member of the Civil Committee for the Section du Faubourg-du-Nord. The committee's notes refer to him as a painter. In 1794, he was transferred to the Revolutionary Committee of the 5th Arrondissement, but wrote to the Committee of General Security, declining the "promotion".

His request was apparently denied, as he was on the Anti-Jacobin proscription list of 1801. He was, however, not among those who supported the Reign of Terror. It is presumed that he was more of a Girondist. Later, he was an enthusiastic supporter of Napoleon; most likely to ensure that he would be removed from the list.

He seems to have stopped painting in 1807, and died almost twenty years later. His sister, Augustine-Geneviève, inherited the house, then passed it on to a cousin. It was eventually purchased by the Bidault de l'Isle fsmily, who found his collection of gouaches, packed in boxes. The collection included 83 sheets of figures, cut and pasted from cardboard, with explanatory notes. Although technically naïve, they are free of anachronisms, attesting to their contemporaneity, and portray women without the usual stereotypes. A similar series of smaller figures, depicting King Louis XVI, may have been made by Lesueur's father in the 1770s.

It is believed that both sets of figures may have been intended for use in a sort of miniature theatre, as there is considerable wear, and it appears that they were mounted on sticks. The text boxes are highly critical of the Revolution, and were probably added at a later date.

They first came to public attention in 1947, when the astronomer and politician, Georges Bidault de l'Isle, loaned some to the Musée Carnavalet. In 1977, following an inheritance division, 50 of these gouaches entered the Louvre Museum, which deposited them at the Carnavalet. Four others were donated in 1989, ten in 2002 and eleven in 2005. An unknown number may still be in private hands, as some key events of the Revolution are not represented.

== Sources ==
- Michel Vovelle, La Révolution française. Images et récits, vol. III, 1986, p. 282-299 ISBN 978-2-209-05726-9
- Claude Langlois, "Révolution en famille ou révolution de la famille? Le témoignage des gouaches de Lesueur", in: Annales de démographie historique, 1987, p. 349-364. (Online)
- Philippe de Carbonnières, Lesueur. Gouaches révolutionnaires. Collections du Musée Carnavalet, 2005. ISBN 2-87900-858-1
- Philippe de Carbonnières, "Nouvelles gouaches révolutionnaires de Jean-Baptiste Lesueur. Entrées au musée Carnavalet (2005-2011)", in: Annales historiques de la Révolution française, 2014, nr. 2, p. 107-134. (Online)
