= Symbolism in the French Revolution =

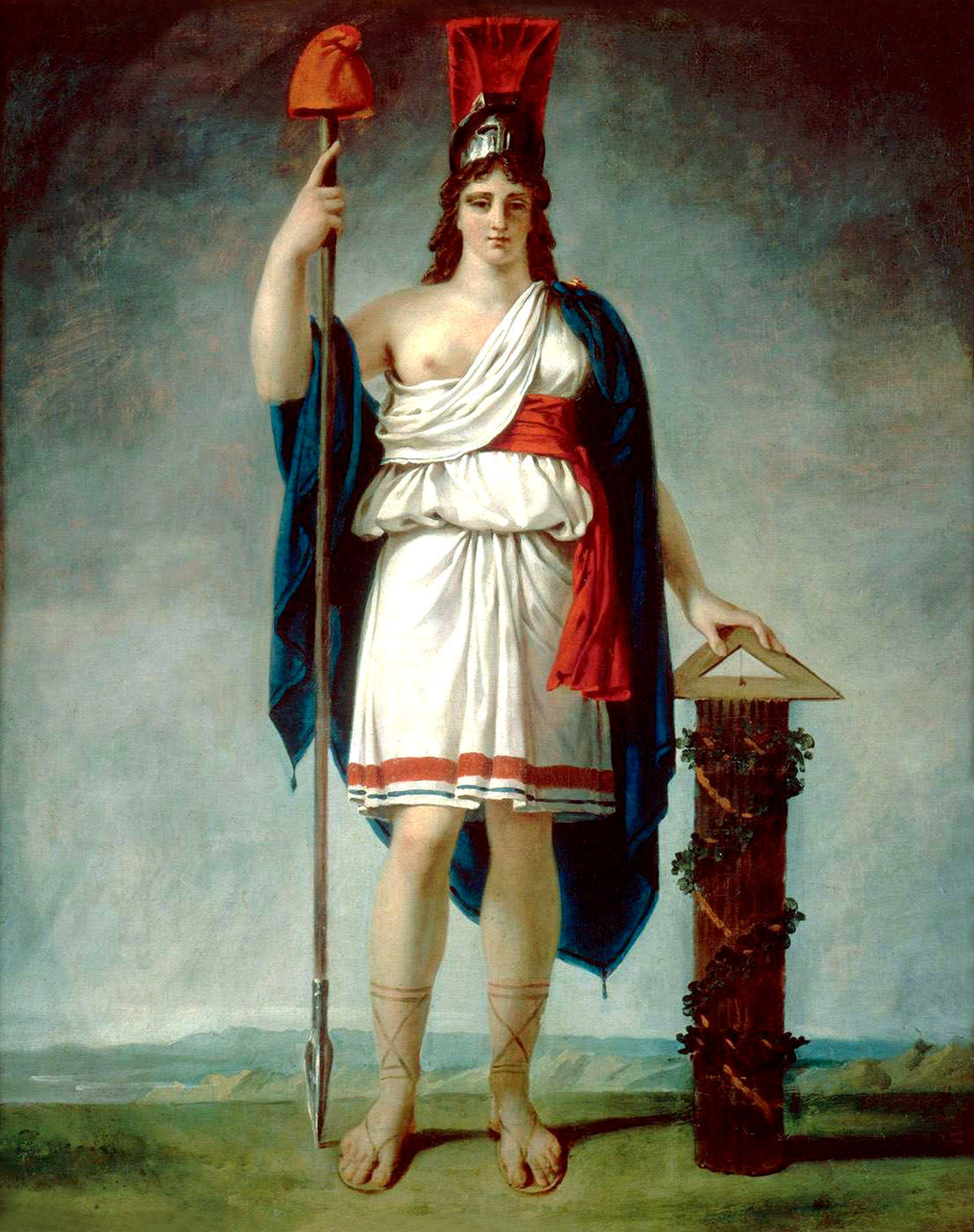
Allegory of the first French Republic by Antoine-Jean Gros

Symbolism in the French Revolution was the use of artistic symbols to emphasize and celebrate (or vilify) the main features of the French Revolution and promote public identification with and support for the cause. In order to effectively illustrate the differences between the new Republic and the old regime, revolutionaries implemented new symbols to be celebrated instead of the old religious and monarchical symbolism.

To this end, symbols were borrowed from historic cultures and redefined, while those of the old regime were either destroyed or reattributed acceptable characteristics. New symbols and styles were put in place to separate the new, Republican country from the monarchy of the past. These new and revised symbols were used to instill in the public a new sense of tradition and reverence for the Enlightenment and the Republic.

== Fasces ==
The national emblem of France depicts a fasces, representing justice.

Fasces, like many other symbols of the French Revolution, are Roman in origin. Fasces are a bundle of birch rods containing a sacrificial axe. In Roman times, the fasces symbolized the power of magistrates, representing union and accord with the Roman Republic. The French Republic continued this Roman symbol to represent state power, justice, and unity.

During the Revolution, the fasces image was often used in conjunction with many other symbols. Though seen throughout the French Revolution, perhaps the most well known French reincarnation of the fasces is the Fasces surmounted by a Phrygian cap. This image has no display of an axe or a strong central state; rather, it symbolizes the power of the liberated people by placing the Liberty Cap on top of the classical symbol of power.

== Tricolore cockade ==
The tricolore cockade was created in July 1789. White (the royal color) was added to nationalise an earlier blue and red design.

Cockades were widely worn by revolutionaries beginning in 1789. They now pinned the blue-and-red cockade of Paris onto the white cockade of the Ancien Régime - thus producing the original cockade of France. Later, distinctive colours and styles of cockade would indicate the wearer's faction—although the meanings of the various styles were not entirely consistent, and varied somewhat by region and period.

The tricolore flag is derived from the cockades used in the 1790s. These were circular rosette-like emblems attached to the hat. Camille Desmoulins asked his followers to wear green cockades on 12 July 1789. The Paris militia, formed on 13 July, adopted a blue and red cockade. Blue and red are the traditional colours of Paris, and they are used on the city's coat of arms. Cockades with various colour schemes were used during the storming of the Bastille on 14 July. The blue and red cockade was presented to King Louis XVI at the Hôtel de Ville on 17 July. Lafayette argued for the addition of a white stripe to "nationalise" the design. On 27 July, a tricolore cockade was adopted as part of the uniform of the National Guard, the national police force that succeeded the militia.

The Society of Revolutionary Republican Women, a militant group on the far left, demanded a law in 1793 that would compel all women to wear the tricolore cockade to demonstrate their loyalty to the Republic. The law was passed but was violently opposed by other groups of women. The Jacobins in charge of the government decided that women had no place in public affairs, and disbanded all women's organizations in October 1793.

== Liberty cap ==
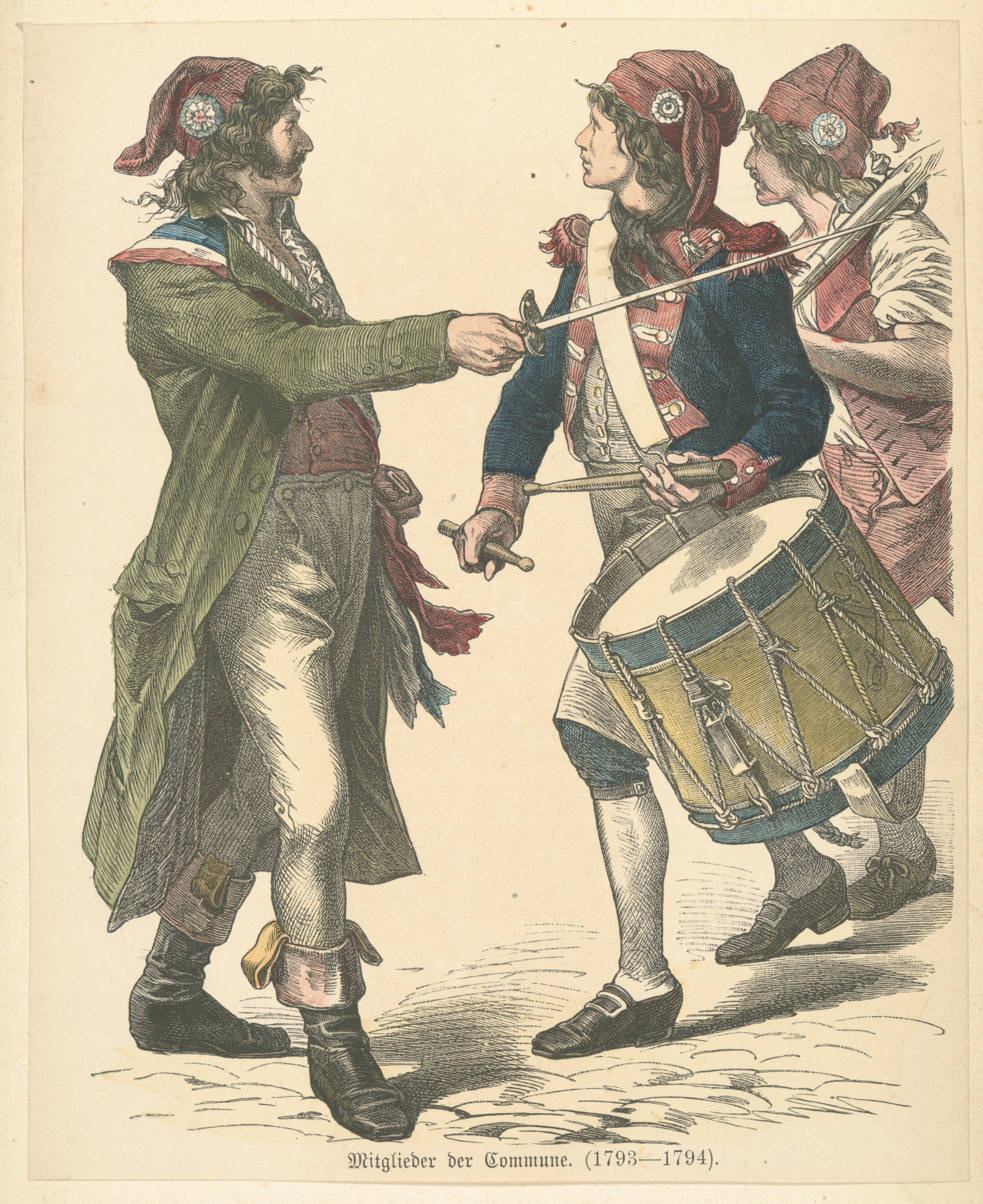
French revolutionaries wearing Phrygian caps and tricolor cockades

The Liberty cap, also known as the Phrygian cap, is a brimless, felt cap descended from the Roman pileus. It is conical in shape with the tip pulled forward. The cap was originally worn by ancient Romans, Greeks, Illyrians and is still worn today in Albania and Kosovo.

In revolutionary France, the cap or bonnet rouge was first seen publicly in May 1790, at a festival in Troyes adorning a statue representing the nation, and at Lyon, on a lance carried by the goddess Libertas. To this day the national emblem of France, Marianne, is shown wearing a Phrygian cap. The caps were often knitted by women known as Tricoteuse who sat beside the guillotine during public executions in Paris in the French Revolution, supposedly continuing to knit in between executions.

The emblem's popularity during the French Revolution is due in part to its importance in ancient Rome: its use alludes to the Roman ritual of manumission of slaves, in which a freed slave receives the bonnet as a symbol of his newfound liberty. The Roman tribune Lucius Appuleius Saturninus incited the slaves to insurrection by displaying a pileus as if it were a standard.

The liberty cap is often red in color. This type of cap was worn by revolutionaries at the fall of the Bastille. According to the Revolutions de Paris, it became "the symbol of the liberation from all servitudes, the sign for unification of all the enemies of despotism."

== Clothing ==
Here, Louis XIV is depicted wearing the traditional red heels associated with his court. Such heels had become a symbol of Louis XIV, of the royal court, and of monarchy more broadly.

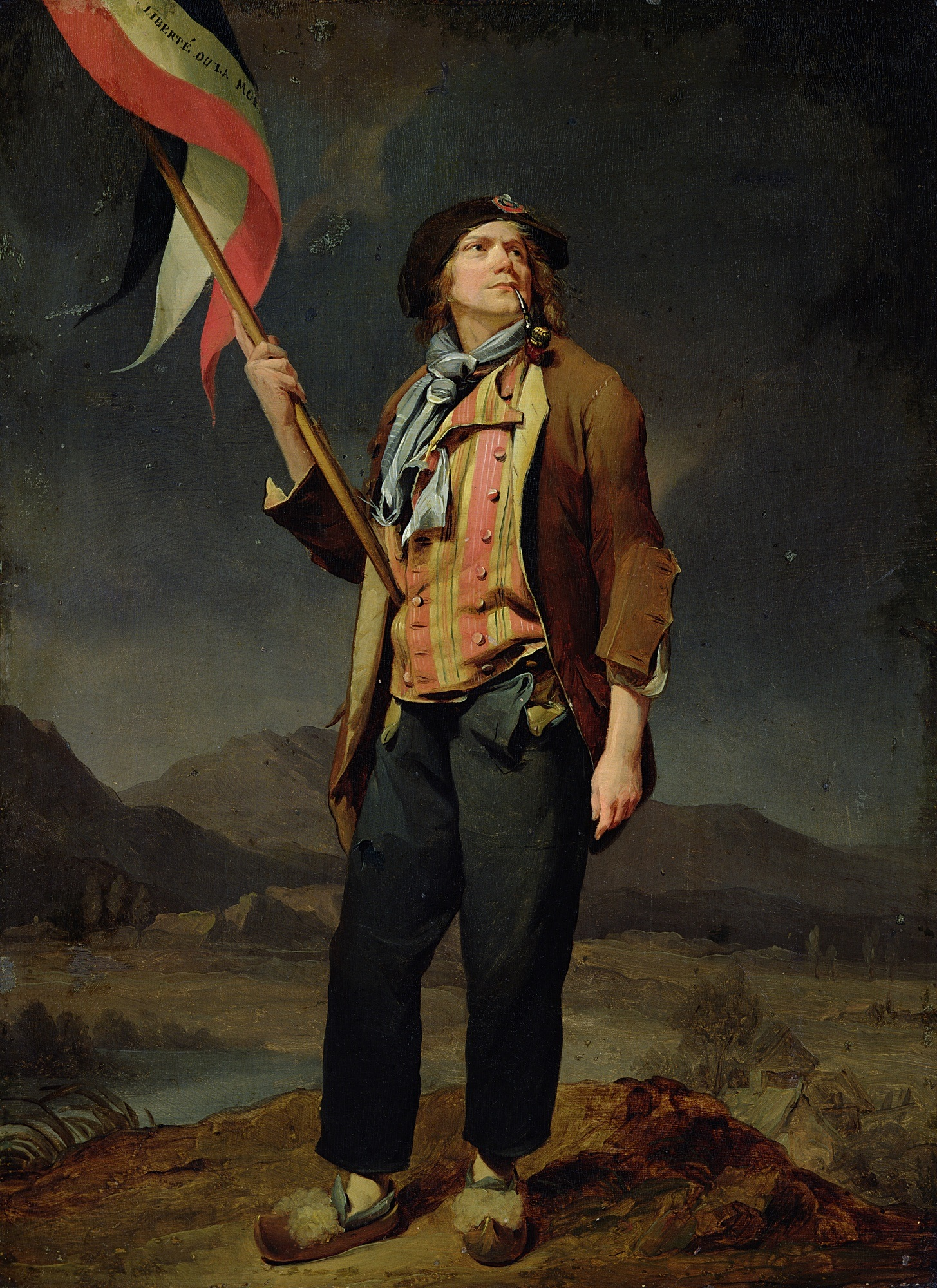
Simon Chenard as a Sans-Culotte by Louis-Léopold Boilly, 1792. Early depiction of the tricolour in the hands of a sans-culotte during the French Revolution.

As the radicals and Jacobins became more powerful, there was a revulsion against high-fashion because of its extravagance and its association with royalty and aristocracy. It was replaced with a sort of "anti-fashion" for men and women that emphasized simplicity and modesty. The men wore plain, dark clothing and short unpowdered hair. During the Terror of 1794, the workaday outfits of the sans-culottes symbolized Jacobin egalitarianism. Sans-culotte literally translates to "without culottes", referring to the long pants worn by the revolutionaries who used their dress to distanced themselves from the French aristocracy, and aristocracy as a whole, who traditionally would have worn culotte, or silk knee-breeches. Such long pants were a symbol of the working man. High fashion and extravagance returned under the Directory, 1795–99, with its "directoire" styles; the men did not return to extravagant customs. Another symbol of the French aristocracy was the high heel. Prior to the French Revolution, high heels were a staple of men's fashion, worn by those who could afford them to signify high social standing. Louis XIV popularized and regulated the wearing of the high heel within his court. The king himself, along with many of the nobility at his court wore red high heels, the red color being used to "...demonstrate that the nobles did not dirty their shoes..." according to Philip Mansel, an expert of court history. During the revolution, however, these styles fell out of fashion for men as the monarchy became increasingly unpopular and associations with the monarchy became increasingly dangerous. Such fashion also became symbols of frivolity, which made them unpopular for the average French individual.

== Liberty Tree ==
The Liberty Tree, officially adopted in 1792, is a symbol of the everlasting Republic, national freedom, and political revolution. It has historic roots in revolutionary France as well as America, as a symbol that was shared by the two nascent republics. The tree was chosen as a symbol of the French Revolution because it symbolizes fertility in French folklore, which provided a simple transition from revering it for one reason to another. The American colonies also used the idea of a Liberty Tree to celebrate their own acts of insurrection against the British, starting with the Stamp Act riot in 1765.

The riot culminated in the hanging in effigy of two Stamp Act politicians on a large elm tree. The elm tree began to be celebrated as a symbol of Liberty in the American colonies. It was adopted as a symbol that needed to be living and growing, along with the Republic. To that end, the tree is portrayed as a sapling, usually of an oak tree in French interpretation. The Liberty Tree serves as a constant celebration of the spirit of political freedom.

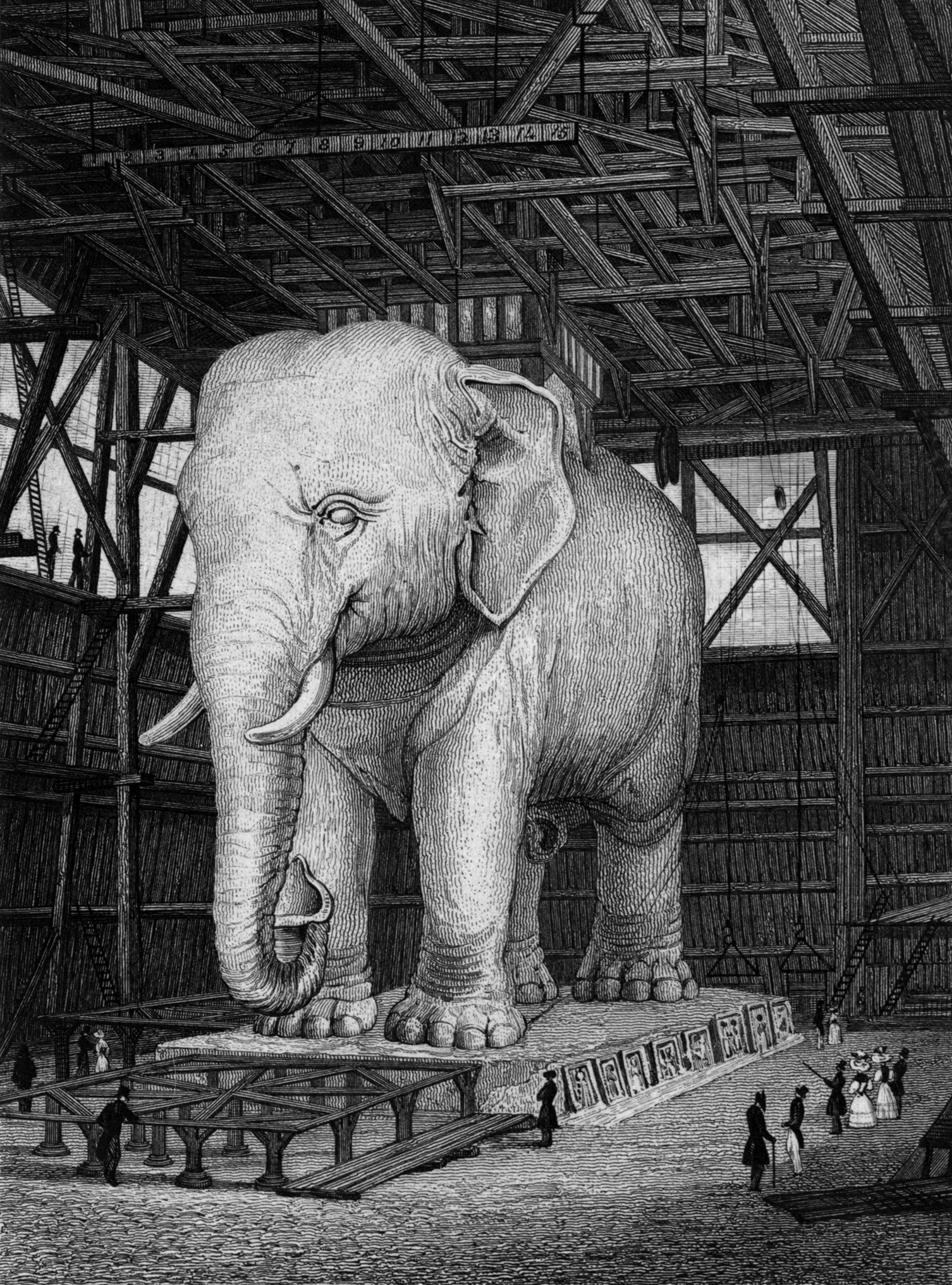
The above is an 1831 engraving of a plaster model for the proposed Elephant of the Bastille monument to the fall of the Bastille prison.

== The Elephant of the Bastille and the July Column ==
The fall of the Bastille on July 14, 1789, marked an important moment for the French people. A prominent symbol of monarchical reign, the Bastille initially served as a political prison. In time, however, the Bastille had transitioned from being a prison, to housing primarily weapons, though the symbolism remained, and the building had become synonymous with the French monarchy and tyrannical reign. The fall of the monument resulted in several nobles fleeing France, and violent attacks on the wealthy. The Elephant of the Bastille was erected to mark the fall of the Bastille, designed by Napoleon as a symbol to his own victories, which he had constructed from the guns of his enemies at Battle of Friedland. The elephant was demolished in 1846 and replaced with the July Column, which now stands in Paris on the elephant's original base. This column was created under the reign of King Louis-Philippe I to celebrate the July revolution of 1830 and the installment of the July Monarchy.

== Hercules ==
The symbol of Hercules was first adopted by the Old Regime to represent the monarchy. Hercules was an ancient Greek hero who symbolized strength and power. The symbol was used to represent the sovereign authority of the King over France during the reign of the Bourbon monarchs. However, the monarchy was not the only ruling power in French history to use the symbol of Hercules to declare its power.

During the Revolution, the symbol of Hercules was revived to represent nascent revolutionary ideals. The first use of Hercules as a revolutionary symbol was during a festival celebrating the National Assembly's victory over federalism on 10 August 1793. "Federalism" was a movement to weaken the central government. This Festival of Unity consisted of four stations around Paris which featured symbols representing major events of the Revolution which embodied revolutionary ideals of liberty, unity, and power.

The statue of Hercules, placed at the station commemorating the fall of Louis XVI, symbolized the power of the French people over their former oppressors. The statue's foot was placed on the throat of the Hydra, which represented the tyranny of federalism which the new Republic had vanquished. In one hand, the statue grasped a club, a symbol of power, while in the other grasping the fasces which symbolized the unity of the French people. The image of Hercules assisted the new Republic in establishing its new Republican moral system. Hercules thus evolved from a symbol of the sovereignty of the monarch into a symbol of the new sovereign authority in France: the French people.

This transition was made easily for two reasons. First, because Hercules was a famous mythological figure, and had previously been used by the monarchy, he was easily recognized by educated French observers. It was not necessary for the revolutionary government to educate the French people on the background of the symbol. Additionally, Hercules recalled the classical age of the Greeks and the Romans, a period which the revolutionaries identified with republican and democratic ideals. These connotations made Hercules an easy choice to represent the powerful new sovereign people of France.

During the more radical phase of the Revolution from 1793 to 1794, the usage and depiction of Hercules changed. These changes to the symbol were due to revolutionary leaders believing the symbol was inciting violence among the common citizens. The triumphant battles of Hercules and the overcoming of enemies of the Republic became less prominent. In discussions over what symbol to use for the Seal of the Republic, the image of Hercules was considered but eventually ruled out in favor of Marianne.

Hercules was on the coin of the Republic. However, this Hercules was not the same image as that of the pre-Terror phases of the Revolution. The new image of Hercules was more domesticated. He appeared more paternal, older, and wiser, rather than the warrior-like images in the early stages of the French Revolution. Unlike his 24-foot statue in the Festival of the Supreme Being, he was now the same size as Liberty and Equality.

Also the language on the coin with Hercules was very different from the rhetoric of pre-revolutionary depictions. On the coins the words, "uniting Liberty and Equality" were used. This is opposed to the forceful language of early Revolutionary rhetoric and rhetoric of the Bourbon monarchy. By 1798, the Council of Ancients had discussed the "inevitable" change from the problematic image of Hercules, and Hercules was eventually phased out in favor of an even more docile image.

== La Marseillaise ==
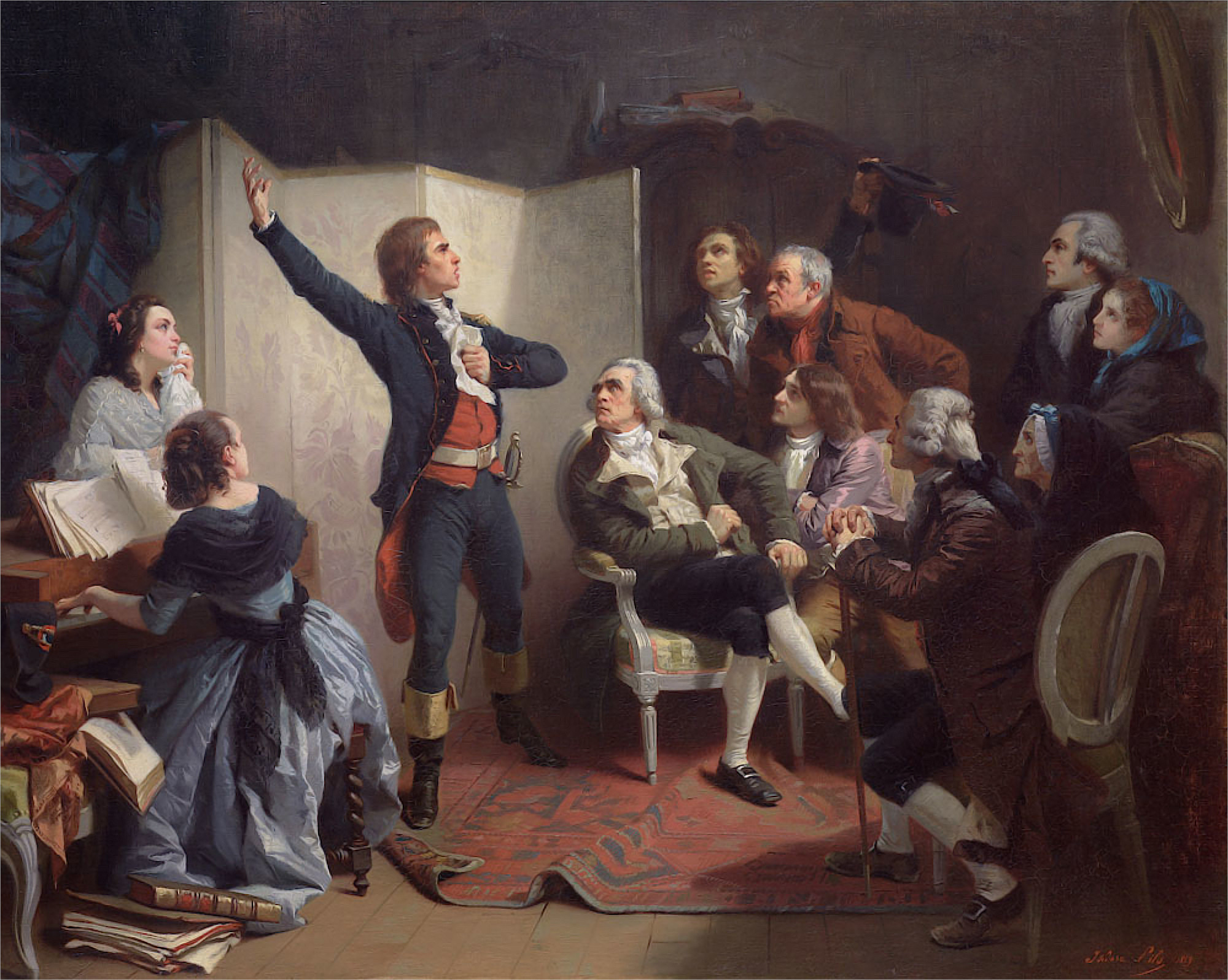
Rouget de Lisle, composer of the Marseillaise, sings it for the first time in 1792

La Marseillaise
The French national anthem La Marseillaise; text in French.

"La Marseillaise" (French pronunciation: [la maʁsɛjɛːz]) became the national anthem of France. The song was written and composed in 1792 by Claude Joseph Rouget de Lisle, and was originally titled "Chant de guerre pour l'Armée du Rhin". The French National Convention adopted it as the First Republic's anthem in 1795. It acquired its nickname after being sung in Paris by volunteers from Marseille marching on the capital.

The song is the first example of the "European march" anthemic style. The anthem's evocative melody and lyrics have led to its widespread use as a song of revolution and its incorporation into many pieces of classical and popular music. Cerulo says, "the design of "La Marseillaise" is credited to General Strasburg of France, who is said to have directed de Lisle, the composer of the anthem, to 'produce one of those hymns which conveys to the soul of the people the enthusiasm which it (the music) suggests.'"

== Guillotine ==
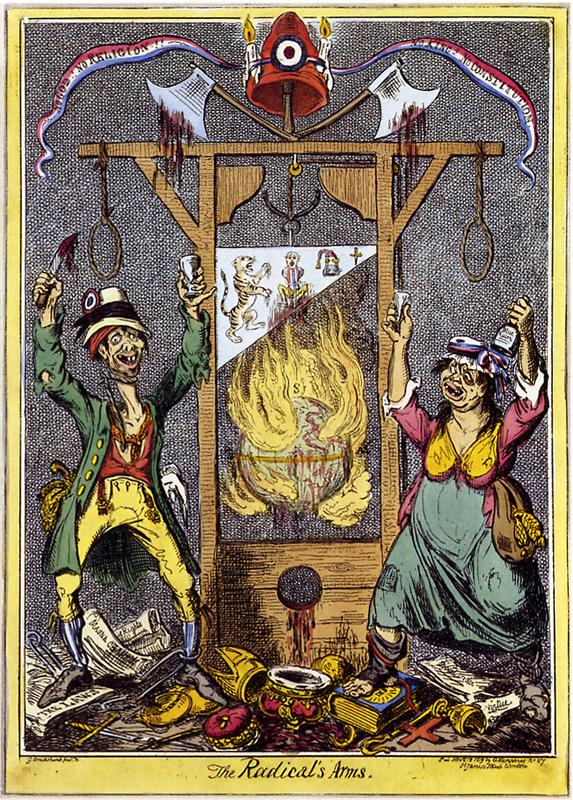
As shown in this British cartoon by Isaac Cruikshank, the guillotine became a disparaging symbol of violent excess during the Reign of Terror. The tricolor ribbon on top is inscribed "No God! No Religion! No King! No Constitution!" Below the ribbon, and its Phrygian cap with tricolor cockade, are two bloody axes, attached to a guillotine, whose blade is suspended above a world aflame. An emaciated man and drunken woman dressed in ragged clothes serve as heraldic "supporters", gleefully dancing on discarded royal and clerical regalia.

Hanson notes, "The guillotine stands as the principal symbol of the Terror in the French Revolution." Invented by a physician during the Revolution as a quicker, more efficient and more distinctive form of execution, the guillotine became a part of popular culture and historic memory. It was celebrated on the left as the people's avenger and cursed as the symbol of the Reign of Terror by the right. Its operation became a popular entertainment that attracted great crowds of spectators. Vendors sold programs listing the names of those scheduled to die. Many people came day after day and vied for the best locations from which to observe the proceedings; knitting women (tricoteuses) formed a cadre of hardcore regulars, inciting the crowd. Parents often brought their children. By the end of the Terror, the crowds had thinned drastically. Repetition had staled even this most grisly of entertainments, and audiences grew bored.

== The Volcano ==
The rhetoric of violence in the French revolution was heavily influenced by the tendency to turn to the phenomena of the natural world in order to describe and explain the changes in society. In a world of rapid political and cultural changes, prominent figures in the Revolution actively used certain linguistic tools in order to create a political language that resonated with the public. Many of them were also familiar with the developing scientific areas of natural history, either through a developed interest or the pursuit of a career in the natural sciences. Consequently, natural imagery became the means of both ‘imagining and explaining revolution’.

In this manner, the metaphor of the volcano flourished in the revolutionary imagination. Initially, the volcano symbolised ‘unbridled force and destruction, but a destruction that could work against France as well for it’. However, as the Revolution progressed, so did the image of the volcano and its significance for human advancement. From being a source of potential destruction and catastrophe, the volcano later symbolised a ‘constructive revolutionary transformation’ during the Reign of Terror. As the political situation again shifted, the image of the volcano eventually returned to its status as a force of unrelenting power. The changing symbolic meanings of the volcano in themselves present the Revolution as a source of unpredictable and inevitable destruction that lay beyond human control.

However, given the animosity of the French people, their rising political dissatisfaction and restlessness, even the metaphor of a scorching volcano paled. Even metaphors drawn from the furious glory of nature failed to describe the ferocity of a nation and its people scorned. This metaphorical transformation is reflected in genres across the literary spectrum, including the birth and increasing popularity of the novel as a form of expression.

These vivid comparisons between social transformation and natural catastrophe were not uncommon. Writing twenty years before the 1787 Assembly of Notables, the political philosopher Jean Jacques Rousseau emphasised seismic activity, such as volcanic tremors, blasts and pyroclastic surges, as a key force behind the spread of early human civilisation. According to his Second Discourse, not only did natural disasters drive communities closer together, strengthening their bonds of cooperation, but they also enabled such communities to witness the power of combustion as an essential resource for the eventual production of working tools. Rousseau's optimistic vision of naturalised change, of upheaval as a generative and progressive stage in the life cycle of governance, is echoed, but not shared by the British radical press. When the image of the volcano became codified as the stamp of French, revolutionary threat is unclear, however, multiple citations can be traced through broadsheets issued between 1788 – 1830. In his Weekly Political Register, the parliamentarian William Cobbett warns against ‘the burning lava of the French Revolution’ and deplores the day when ‘our (British) power (will be) crippled by such convulsion of nature’.
