= Revolutionary Knitting Circle =

- Abbreviation: RKC
- Formation: 2000
- Founder: Grant Neufeld
- Type: Activism, Craftivism
- Website: https://web.archive.org/web/20090517085304/http://knitting.activist.ca/

The Revolutionary Knitting Circle (RKC) is an international activist group that engages in craftivism, focusing on knitting and textile handicrafts to promote social change. Established in Calgary, Alberta, Canada, by Grant Neufeld in 2000. The group uses knitting to contrast with the ideas that protests are violent and the ways in which police handle the protests. The movement has expanded, with groups forming in various regions of the United States and Europe.

== History ==
The Revolutionary Knitting Circle's inaugural event, the Global Knit-In, occurred during the 2002 G8 Summit in Calgary. This event featured knitting demonstrations at corporate and financial institutions in various cities. One example of these demonstrations occurred in Ottawa, Canada, where participants created a symbolic 'social safety net' from knitted squares. They also participated in the global day of action to end the occupation of Iraq, held in Calgary on March 20, 2004.

== Cultural Context ==
The RKC's activities align with a broader history of craft-based activism, connecting to traditions such as sewing circles and the historical French tricoteuses.

The Revolutionary Knitting Circle challenges the stereotype that knitting is for women only and encourages all genders to take up knitting together.

== See also ==
- Sewing circle
- Tricoteuse
- Craftivism
