= Fragment Society =

American nonprofit organization

- Formation: December 22, 1812; 212 years ago
- Founded at: Boston, Massachusetts
- Type: Charitable Society
- Purpose: Provide clothing and layettes to needy members of the greater Boston area community.
- Website: www.fragmentsociety.org

The Fragment Society is a charitable women's society, founded in 1812 in Boston and incorporated in 1816.

== Mission and history ==
The members of the Fragment Society make and buy clothing to be given to those in need. It is one of the oldest continuously-operating sewing circles in the United States, and the oldest continuous sewing circle in Boston. The first meeting of the Fragment Society was held on October 19, 1812, and the constitution of the organization was adopted during their second meeting, held October 22 of that same year. There were eleven original members of the Fragment Society, six single women and five married women. They chose their name from the parable of Jesus feeding the multitude with loaves of bread and fish, in which Jesus reminds his disciples to leave nothing behind, “to gather up the fragments that remained, that nothing be lost.” Their original aim was to meet the increasing needs of the widows and orphans quickly cropping up in the wake of the War of 1812. Shortly after the founding meetings, the founders of the Society recruited four hundred other members from Boston's leading families, many of whom joined as family groups. In the first year of operation, at least 506 requests for assistance were answered by the Society. Since the beginning, the Fragment Society has been particularly concerned with pregnant women, and adopted the practice of creating layettes for needy mothers. The Fragment Society was incorporated by the Commonwealth of Massachusetts in 1816. The society celebrated their bicentennial in October 2012.

== Current activities ==
The Fragment Society purchases the clothes that they give away as donations, with the exception of layettes, which members sew at meetings. They have been known to occasionally give aid in the form of scholarships or fundraising, but only very rarely. Their charitable efforts are mostly focused on the greater Boston area, but in times of national emergency, their aid work has been more widespread.

Membership in the Fragment Society is relatively limited, and the organization usually consists of about 200 dues-paying members, many of whom are the descendants of past members. The dues paid by members go towards the Society's permanent fund, the interest of which funds much of the Society's charity work. The administration of the Society consists of a president, vice president, secretary, treasurer, and a board of managers. There are five meetings a year.

== See also ==
- Sewing circle
