= Stitch London =

Knitting group in London, England

Stitch London logo.

Stitch London (previously Stitch and Bitch London) was a knitting group in London, England, which was active from 2005 to 2013. They met weekly in various venues across central London to knit in public. It was also a virtual knitting group whose members join via newsletter, Facebook, Ravelry, and Twitter. Its members numbered in their thousands and it had a global membership despite being based in London.

The group was open to anyone who wanted join. There were no restrictions on who could join, and attendance was free.

Meetings happened all over London once a week. There was no set day. The group met on weekday evenings, and venues varied from pubs and bars to cafés, and occasionally off-beat venues such as Bloomsbury Bowling Lanes, The Science Museum and the Hunterian Museum at the Royal College of Surgeons of England.

They also sent out a fortnightly newsletter, which included details of meeting venues, group news, knitting news, and the most bizarre and amusing knitting gems they could dig up on the web.

The group would also teach people to knit for free. Prospective knitters needed to bring yarn and needles.The group has taught thousands of knitters.

Stitch London also organised charity knits, graffiti yarnstorming events, and workshops. They have worked with many of London's museums, most notably the Natural History Museum, the Science Museum and the Hunterian Museum.

== History ==
The group was founded in January 2005 in a south London pub. Founders Lauren O’Farrell, Laura Parkinson and Georgia Reid decided to enter the world of public knitting. The group was inspired by the Stitch 'n Bitch book by Debbie Stoller.

The London Lion Scarf.

In February 2007, Stitch and Bitch London presented the London Lion Scarf, a 550 ft scarf knitted by over 150 knitters from 15 different countries, around the necks of the Trafalgar Square Lions in central London. They raised over £2,500 for cancer research. In March 2007, the team expanded to five: Lauren 'Deadly Knitshade' O’Farrell, Laura 'Purl Princess' Parkinson, Joelle 'Knitting Ninja' Finck, Laura 'Lady Knitsalot' deLaat and Candice 'Go Go Garter Girl' Lamb.

In April 2007, the group won the UK's Largest Knitting Group prize, presented by the British Handknitting Association.

Stitchettes since 2007 have been Laura Davis, Joelle Finck, Laura deLaat, Candice Lamb, Annisa Chand and Jenny Steere. Several ex-Stitchettes have gone on to pursue other creative interests, notably Laura Parkinson as 'Purl About Town' for GMC Publications' Knitting magazine.

In November 2009, Lauren O'Farrell took on Stitch London as a full-time business.

The role of Stitch Sages was introduced in late 2009 which offered members the chance to become knitting teachers and pass on their skills on a voluntary basis.

The group has raised thousands of pounds for charities including Cancer Research UK, Age Concern, Macmillan Cancer Support, Médecins Sans Frontières and Breast Cancer Care.

The group used to post to social networking site Ravelry, post to their page on Facebook and tweet from their Twitter account. Their Facebook page was active until 2021.

Stitch and Bitch London became Stitch London in April 2010.

== Books ==
In September 2011, Stitch London: 20 Kooky Ways to Knit the City and More by Lauren O'Farrell was published By David & Charles in the UK and US.
