= Tricoteuse =

French term for a knitting woman

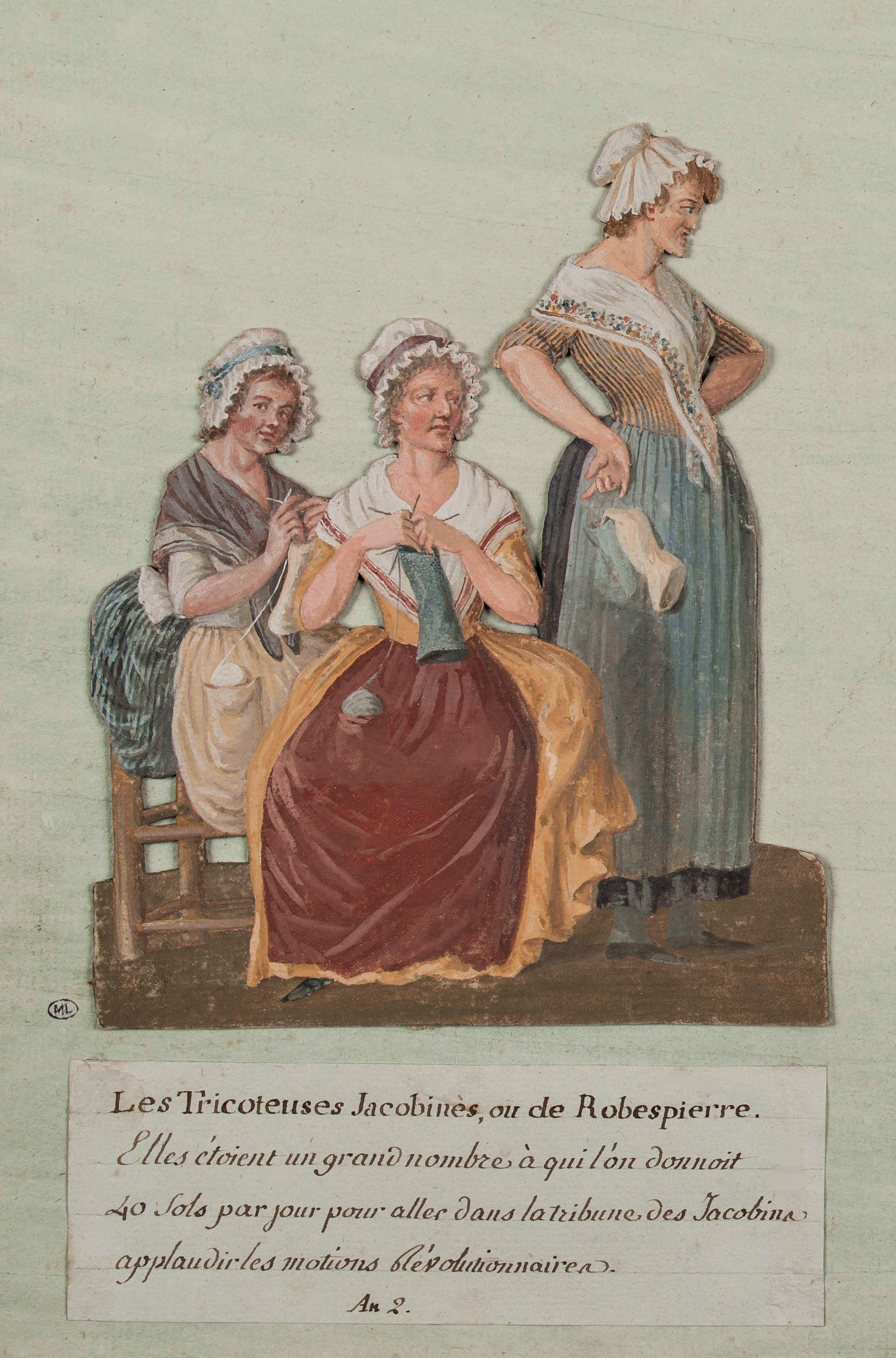
- Contemporary depiction of Tricoteuses by Jean-Baptiste Lesueur
- Years active: 1789–1795
- Country: Kingdom of France – French First Republic
- Influences: Women's March on Versailles

Tricoteuse (French pronunciation: [tʁikɔtøz]) is French for a knitting woman. The term is most often used in its historical sense as a nickname for the women in the French Revolution who sat in the gallery supporting the left-wing politicians in the National Convention, attended the meetings in the Jacobin club, the hearings of the Revolutionary Tribunal, and sat beside the guillotine during public executions, supposedly continuing to knit. The performances of the Tricoteuses were particularly intense during the Reign of Terror.

== Origins ==
One of the earliest outbreaks of insurrection in the revolutionary era was the Women's March on Versailles on 5 October 1789. Irate over high food prices and chronic shortages, working-class women from the markets of Paris marched to the royal residence at the Palace of Versailles to protest. Numbering in the thousands, the crowd of women commanded a unique respect: their demands for bread were met, and Louis XVI was forced to leave his luxurious palace and return, most unwillingly, to Paris to preside "from the national home".

The unexpected success of the march bestowed a near-mythic status upon the previously unheralded market women, and they were "treated as heroines ever since their march to Versailles in October 1789; government after government of Paris delighted to show them honor." Though lacking any central figures who could be ascribed leadership, the group identity of the revolutionary women became highly celebrated. The working "Mothers of the Nation" were praised and solicited by successive governments for years after the march. Eventually the persistent rowdy behavior of the market women became a liability to the increasingly authoritarian revolutionary government.

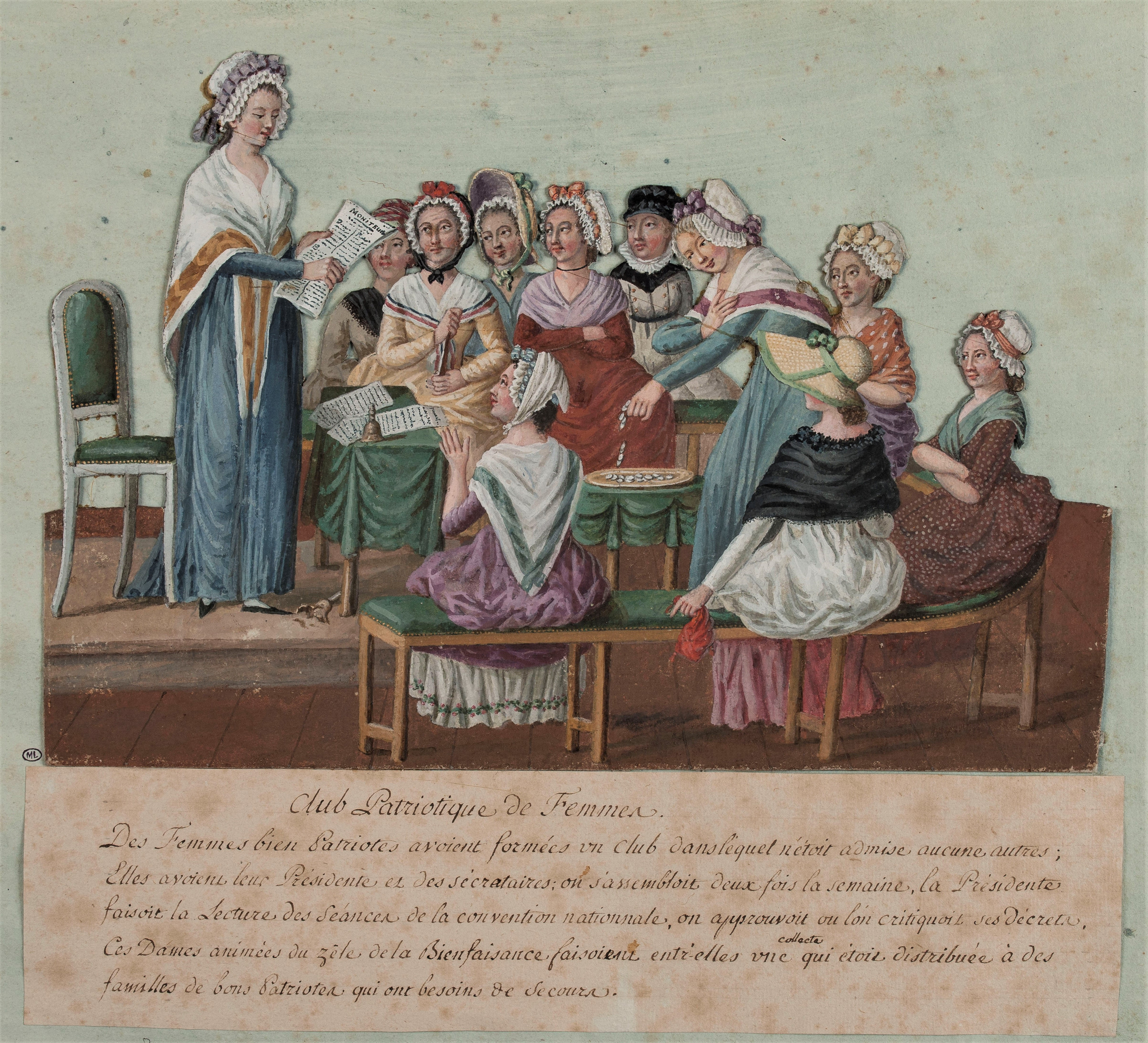
Contemporary depiction of a Revolutionary Women's Club, also by Lesueur

When the Reign of Terror began in 1793, the dangerously unpredictable market women were made unwelcome: in May they were excluded from their traditional seats in the spectator galleries of the National Convention, and only days later they were officially prohibited from any form of political assembly whatsoever. The market women "played an important part in the street history of Paris, up to the Reign of Terror, when their power was suddenly taken from them. On 21 May 1793 they were excluded by a decree from the galleries of the Convention; on 26 May they were forbidden to form part of any political assembly."

The veterans of the march and their numerous successors and hangers-on gathered thereafter at the guillotine in the Place de la Révolution (now Place de la Concorde), as sullen onlookers to the daily public executions. "Thus deprived of active participation in politics, the market-women became the tricoteuses, or knitting-women, who used to take their seats at the Place de la Révolution and watch the guillotine as they knitted."

== In literature ==
- In Charles Dickens' novel A Tale of Two Cities, the character Madame Defarge is a particularly bloodthirsty tricoteuse during the Reign of Terror. She and other female revolutionaries encrypt the names of those who are to be executed into their hand-knit goods by using different sequences of stitches.
- In the first chapter of Emma Orczy's novel The Scarlet Pimpernel the Pimpernel disguises himself as a cart-driving tricoteuse in order to smuggle aristocrats out of Paris.
- The final chapter in Ian Fleming's novel From Russia, with Love is titled "La Tricoteuse" because the head of Russian counter-intelligence agency, Rosa Klebb, is frequently associated with the tricoteuses throughout the novel.

== In movies ==
In the 1965 movie The Art of Love while Casey (James Garner) is being tried for the alleged murder of his friend Paul (Dick Van Dyke) a tricoteuse sits among the public, knitting and yelling "To the guillotine!" every now and then.
