= Stitch 'n Bitch =

Name for some social knitting groups

In February 2007 Stitch and Bitch London presented the London Lion Scarf around the necks of the Trafalgar Square Lions in central London. They raised over £2500 for cancer research.

Stitch 'n Bitch is a name that has been used to refer to social knitting groups since at least World War II. Before the slang term "Stitch 'n Bitch" was used, groups of women in the 1940s would join to knit and talk in organized Stitch and Bitch clubs. The term was further used in the 1980s as part of the book Social History of American Knitting by Anne Macdonald. It is partly due to the book's success that the modern day Stitch 'n Bitch knitting groups have emerged in cities around the world. The groups, mainly women, meet to knit, stitch and talk. Typically, attendees knit, though others crochet (they are called 'Happy Hookers'), and still others engage in cross-stitching, embroidery, and other needlecraft. Nowadays, the groups have been analyzed by scholars as expressions of resistance to major political, social and technological change in Western societies. However, political discussion is not unusual at these events, and at least some participants are proponents of progressive, liberal, and/or leftist social and political change. Furthermore, the term Stitch 'n Bitch is now used by women from across the globe to connect with others in the virtual space seeing as the term has re-emerged in a world where the public sphere is cyberspace.

With over 1460 registered Stitch 'n Bitch groups in 289 cities worldwide, the social knitting movement has demarked itself as a popular social gathering for avid knitters.

== Knitting groups ==
Stitch 'n Bitch is a name used by knitting groups that meet on a weekly or monthly basis at locations throughout the world. This use of the term originates as early as the Second World War. In 1999, Debbie Stoller started a Stitch 'n Bitch group in NYC's East Village, which was open to anyone who wanted to come to knit along or learn to knit. In 2000, she wrote about her groups in BUST magazine, of which she is the editor-in-chief. Brenda Janish read the article and started the Chicago Stitch 'n Bitch group. That article inspired Vickie Howell to start the Los Angeles Stitch 'n Bitch group and later the Austin Stitch 'n Bitch group. Like Stoller's original group, today's Stitch 'n Bitch clubs are generally casual groups of knitters who meet in public spaces such as bars or cafes for socializing and sharing knitting advice. These groups are free or small fee required memberships and open to the public, and are listed in a directory of worldwide knitting groups that was started by Janish and today is maintained by Stoller: Official Home of Stitch 'n Bitch. As of 2010, the site lists over 700 such groups.

== Book series and legal actions ==
The cover of the first book in the series of knitting books by Debbie Stoller, Stitch 'n Bitch: The Knitter's Handbook

A book series by Debbie Stoller includes Stitch 'n Bitch: The Knitter's Handbook, Stitch 'n Bitch Crochet: The Happy Hooker, and other titles.

From 2005 to 2008, Stitch 'n Bitch was the focus of a trademark dispute. In June 2005, the company Sew Fast Sew Easy filed a trademark application for Stitch & Bitch to designate a line of knitting and sewing supplies. As of 2007 this application was suspended. In fall 2005, due to letters claiming trademark infringement from Sew Fast/Sew Easy's lawyers, knitting groups that had accounts with CafePress were forced to remove all items featuring the phrase "Stitch 'n Bitch". Local groups that communicated with each other through Yahoo! Groups were similarly forced to remove "Stitch 'n Bitch" from the name and description of their group. Some groups were deleted, but most groups were able to change their name on Yahoo! to SNB. In 2008, Sew Fast Sew Easy and Debbie Stoller reached a settlement in which Debbie Stoller retained the use of the mark in knitting while Sew Fast Sew Easy retained the use for sewing. Since then all four of Stoller's trademarks have now been registered. The Sew Fast Sew Easy store closed in 2012.

== Social implications ==
In recent years, the Stitch 'n Bitch movement has been considered as a means of reclaiming women's domestic work in feminist circles. Not only have groups officially been formed through website use, but groups of women on university campuses have also followed the trend in order to resist the taboo representation of the traditional woman.

Dr. Beth Ann Pentney, writing in Thirdspace journal, credited Stoller's publications with the rise of feminist knitting. Stoller introduced this approach to feminism to merge political involvement with a women's community-building activity set in a Do-It-Yourself culture. As a response to Stoller, much scrutiny on the effectiveness of the reclamation of domestic arts as a political feminist act has been done. Some say that the reason of the reintroduction of knitting in modern social gatherings is mainly due to the increase in the search for individualism and the anti-consumerism attitude of our generation. With this said, it is important to denote the implication of technologies in the emergence of a "fabriculture" based on the reclamation of domestic arts and crafts. With the internet accessibility of online information and tips and tricks for knitters and crocheters, the traditionally personal practice of knitting can now be shared easily among strangers, and is open to public discussion and new ideas. These webs of knitters worldwide find affinities via a very modern technology opposing the traditional DIY nature of knitting.
