= Loose Ends Project =

US non-profit for grieving families

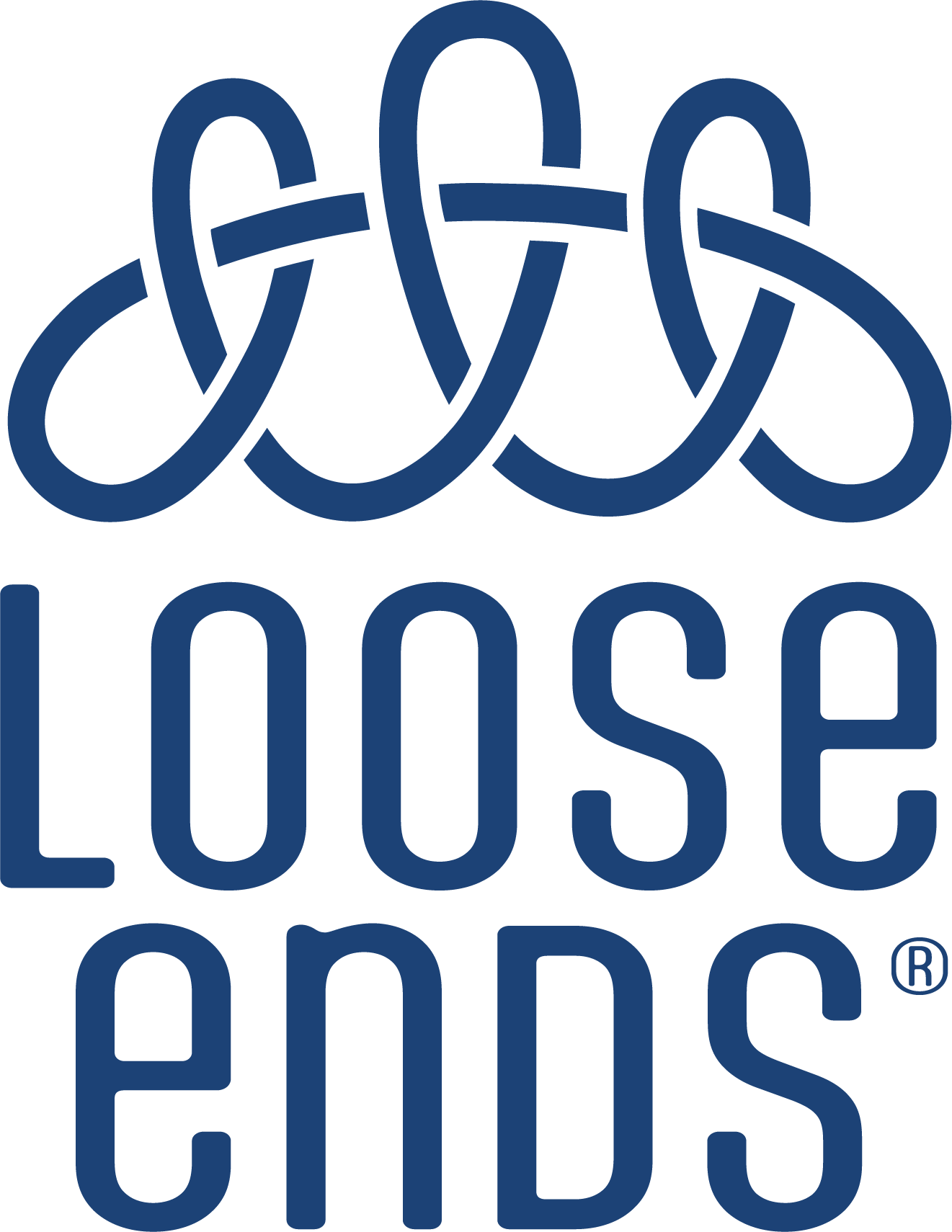
- Established: 2022
- Founders: Masey Kaplan; Jen Simonic
- Type: nonprofit
- Field: textile arts
- Website: https://looseends.org/

The Loose Ends Project is a 501(c)(3) non-profit organisation started in 2022 to help finish fibre arts projects started by people who cannot do so themselves because of illness or death.

== Background ==
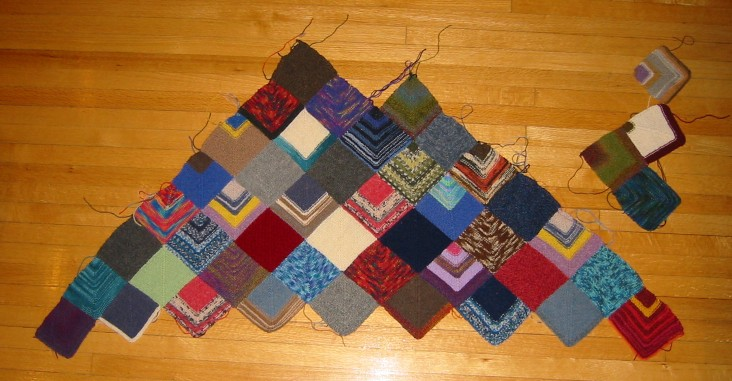
An unfinished blanket with many loose ends

Masey Kaplan and Jen Simonic started the Loose Ends Project in September 2022 to support grieving people. Both of them knit, and both have been asked in the past to finish items left by deceased relatives of their friends. The idea for the project came to them at the Carnegie Mellon University "tartans" class reunion when they were presented with a bag of crafting supplies left from their friend's mother who died, including two unfinished crochet blankets. Kaplan also says that another inspiration was her maker's journal where she describes the designs and composition of her projects.

At first, the authors advertised their project by putting flyers in cafés. Jo-Ann Stores craft retail chain made donations to the Loose Ends Project, and in Februaries 2022−2024, they ran a campaign of donating the change that buyers agreed to "round up". The money from this sponsorship allowed Kaplan and Simonic to work on their non-profit full time and hire a part-time worker. The Loose Ends Project received the Interweave Top 20 Awards in 2023.

== Process ==
The project finds volunteer "finishers" for handmade projects. As of 2025, there are over 28,000 volunteers registered in 65 countries, with skills such as knitting, crochet, embroidery, rug-making, tatting and quilting. The volunteers provide their location, contact details and interests; they work for free, except for postage fees, which have to be paid if there are no local volunteers available. Kaplan and Simonic use a spreadsheet to match finishers and projects. They say that the number of volunteers greatly surpasses the amount of work that needs to be done: in 2024, there were over 2,500 projects completed, or about 1 project per 12 registered volunteers.

Project owners known as ("holders") provide pictures and information about the work and a short biography of the original author. They usually send finishers the project by mail along with the materials and patterns, if available; the finisher sends it back once they are done. Volunteers often mark the place where they have started working on the item to allow the recipients to identify parts made by the original author. For projects without patterns, finishers have to make design choices, and even modify the item if the recipient has already grown out of it. Sometimes finishers go beyond just completing the project. For example, one finisher learned how to dye yarn while another hired a truck to transport bulky weaving equipment. Kaplan and Simonic try to match people who live next to each other, hoping that it might start a friendship in the crafting community.
