= Ravelry =

Yarnworking social network

- Company type: Private
- Website type: Social networking service, e-commerce
- Founded: 2007
- Headquarters: Boston, Massachusetts, USA
- Owners: Ravelry, LLC
- Founders: Cassidy and Jessica Forbes
- Website: www.ravelry.com
- Commercial: Yes
- Registration: Free
- Launched: 2007

Ravelry is a free social networking service and website that beta-launched in May 2007. It functions as an organizational tool for a variety of fiber arts, including knitting, crocheting, spinning and weaving. Members share patterns, projects, ideas, and their collection of yarn, fiber, and tools via various components of the site.

== Development ==
Spouses Cassidy and Jessica Forbes founded Ravelry in May 2007. Their idea was to create a web presence for all fiber artists.

Ravelry is a place for knitters, crocheters, designers, spinners, and dyers to keep track of their yarn, tools and pattern information, and look to others for ideas and inspiration.

Ravelry has been mentioned by Tim Bray as "[one] of the world’s more successful deployments of Ruby on Rails technologies."

As of March 2020, Ravelry had almost 9 million registered users, and approximately 1 million monthly active users.

== Features ==
Information in Ravelry is organized within a series of tabs. Some customization is available within the tabs (i.e. the ability to re-sort information contained in a tab, create sub-tabs, or change the level of detail displayed). The site was in beta through early 2010, and new features and enhancements are still added frequently. Often these features and enhancements are driven by the community.

These many features are broken down by Maria Hellstrom into three capability spaces: labor, social, and marketplace.

=== Labor space ===
The labor space includes the capabilities which directly support making and documenting fiber arts projects. Capabilities such as the user "Projects" album and pattern "Queue" are tools for personal organization. Ravelry patterns can be added to a logged-in user's "Favorites," "Queue," or "Projects" pages, indicating that user's interest in, stated desire to make, or progress into the pattern, respectively; a user can additionally record their fiber-related tools ("Needles & Hooks") and available yarn ("Stash") with which to complete these projects.

Ravelry also includes a searchable community-edited yarn and pattern database where users share information and project photos. The database was created by encouraging people to share their projects and information.

"The community-edited yarn and pattern database is something that has never existed before. If someone else has used a pattern or yarn, no matter how obscure, you can probably find information and project photos on Ravelry. The personal organizational tool is actually entirely public and we were able to create this database by encouraging people who share their projects and information (by using the organizational tools) to contribute to the yarn and pattern directory."

=== Social space ===
For social networking, the site has forums, groups, and friend-related features that give people ways to interact with other knitters, crocheters, weavers and spinners. Photos can be added to project and stash pages, and also to forum posts, by connecting to the user's own Flickr or Photobucket or Picasa or Instagram account or by uploading a photo directly from the user's computer or iPhone.

Ravelry and other handcraft-based social networks are unique among social networks in that "[i]t is not adequate to state that one is a knitter or crocheter – one must prove it through acts of labour and documentation." Social capital on Ravelry is "accumulated through extensive cataloguing of handmade items" and "is textually accessible through the way members interact with each other using articulated and manoeuvrable links (often in the concrete form of hyperlinks) to other members."

This social capital can be used by craft learners to find answers to questions that they may not know the jargon to describe. By supporting the open browsing, modification, and re-mixing of patterns and projects in a social way, Ravelry can be considered a "virtual guild" which "rel[ies] on open access to specialized knowledge."

In addition to the structured organizational tools described above, Ravelry has forums which support many social activities such as knit-alongs, charity drives, and games such as "Sock Wars":

"At the time of writing number three on the ‘most recent and popular’ list was ‘The Detonator’ – a sock pattern being used in the sock wars game. This is a game about speed knitting and good postal technique. Participants sign up to play and they each begin knitting the socks (in this case the Detonator) on the same day. If a player receives a finished pair of the socks in the mail before they have finished their own, they have been ‘assassinated’ and must send their incomplete socks to the assassin, who tries to finish them before being assassinated themselves. Some knitters assassinate three or four others in the timeframe of the game."

=== Marketplace space ===
In addition to serving as an organizational tool and a social network, Ravelry facilitates micro-business, allowing designers to sell their knitting patterns and supporting informal, direct buying and selling between users via the "Stash" and "Needles & Hooks" capabilities. "Yarnies" are semi-professional dyers, spinners, and/or painters who sell handspun, hand-dyed or painted yarns. Yarnies exist in a separate category from users who are simply selling yarn they own but did not make themselves, and must create a special business-type profile on the site, "blur[ring] the lines between a commercial operation and a homemade undertaking." Knitters may use Ravelry to fund-raise for charities, an example of "an activity that straddles the commercial and the non-commercial economies," and the site has been also used by some for market research.

Ravelry itself generates income to maintain the site through three main mechanisms. First, advertisements for a range of fiber arts-related products from both large- and small-scale businesses are displayed throughout the site. Second, the pattern store enables designers to sell PDF versions of their patterns; a small portion of the sales from the pattern stores goes to Ravelry, while 98.7% goes to the designers. Third, the Ravelry Mini-Mart sells branded merchandise such as logo T-shirts, bags, and stickers.

== Controversies ==
=== 2019 ban of support for Donald Trump ===
On June 23, 2019, Ravelry announced via a blog post that it would ban expressions of support of U.S. president Donald Trump and his administration; after Joe Biden's inauguration, the statement was updated to clarify that "this policy is in effect in perpetuity". The reason given was an incompatibility of Ravelry's policy of inclusiveness with the Trump administration's "support for open white supremacy", with co-founder Cassidy Forbes saying that "it became clear that there wasn’t going to be any allowing some Trump stuff and not allowing other stuff. It wasn’t going to be possible." The details of the policy were adapted from a similar policy established by tabletop role-playing community RPGnet in October 2018. For a time, the site suffered from trolls signing up for accounts in order to spam threads with anti-Ravelry and pro-Trump sentiment and some conservative users left the site as a result, with some others being banned from the site.

=== Redesign ===
In June 2020, Ravelry implemented a site redesign which drew significant complaint from users who stated that the new layout triggered a variety of neurological symptoms, including photosensitive epilepsy, migraines, and vertigo. After analyzing the issue, Robert Bartholomew — a medical sociologist and an expert in mass hysteria, but not in web accessibility — published a blog post on Psychology Today describing Ravelry as "an ordinary website" with "no flashing lights or obvious features that should cause health issues", and concluded that the user complaints were most likely the result of "mass suggestion and the redefinition of various ailments as Ravelry-related". Likewise, digital accessibility specialist David Gibson said that while most websites are doing "terribly" with accessibility, Ravelry "doesn’t seem unusually bad". The Epilepsy Foundation of America, however, noted that visual patterns such as stripes of contrasting colors could trigger a seizure, and specifically mentioned Ravelry as a potential issue. Ravelry's response to complaints was characterized as dismissive, and was later disclaimed as "not reflect[ing] the opinions and professional intentions of the Ravelry team".
