= Debbie Stoller =

American author and publisher

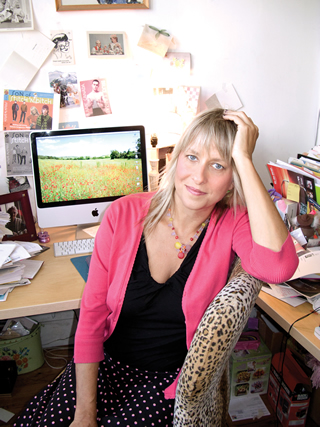
- Education: Yale University (MS, Ph.D)
- Occupations: Writer, publisher, knitter
- Known for: Co-founder of BUST

Debbie Stoller is a New York Times best-selling American author, publisher, feminist commentator and knitting expert whose work includes magazines as well as books. She lives in Brooklyn, New York City. Stoller is the co-founder, co-owner and editor-in-chief of the culture magazine BUST, which she and Marcelle Karp launched in 1993.

== Education ==
Stoller holds a master's degree in psychobiology and a Ph.D in the psychology of women, both from Yale University.

== Career ==
Stoller has been credited with being one of the founders of "girlie feminism", a third-wave feminist strategy in which traditional feminine activities and traits—especially those rejected by second wave feminists of the 1970s as being oppressive—are re-evaluated and often embraced.

In 1993, Stoller (using the alias "Celina Hex") and Karp (using the alias "Betty Boob") co-founded BUST magazine. Bust was a self-funded part-time project for seven years, before being sold to RSub in 2000, enabling Stoller to work on Bust full time. After 9/11, the magazine went out of business temporarily. Costs to recover the business for raised with the help of the magazine's supporters.

In 1999, Stoller and Karp co-edited The BUST Guide to the New Girl Order, which was a compilation of the best writing from BUST magazine to that point. In 1999, Stoller formed a Stitch 'n Bitch group in New York City's East Village to teach and encourage others to knit, and began writing about her hobby and her group in BUST magazine. In 2003, Stoller authored Stitch 'N Bitch: The Knitter's Handbook, the first of the best-selling Stitch'n Bitch series of knitting books, calendars and journals. It was followed by Stitch 'n Bitch Nation, which also made the New York Times Best Seller list, Stitch 'n Bitch Crochet: The Happy Hooker, Son of Stitch 'n Bitch, and Stitch 'n Bitch Superstar Knitting. She hosts and teaches on Stitch 'n Beach cruises and Stitch 'n Bitch Tuscany. Stoller encourages her readers to take on the "feminine" activity of knitting and organize their own Stitch 'N Bitch sessions in their communities. In 2010, Stoller teamed with Red Heart to launch a yarn line, Stitch Nation by Debbie Stoller.

Stoller has been described in Vogue Knitting as on "a quest to rehabilitate so-called women's work". She has said "Since I started knitting and discovered all the sexism and stigma connected with it because of its association with women, I really wanted to make an effort to get as many people as possible interested in this to help elevate its cultural image".

== Guest appearances ==
Stoller has appeared on Politically Incorrect with Bill Maher, The Roseanne Show, Good Morning America, The Today Show, and NPR’s All Things Considered. Stoller has appeared as special guest at the Dutch Stitch 'n Bitch Dag in Rotterdam each year since 2006. She made her debut appearance at a UK knitting show on November 10, 2007, as special guest for I Knit London's UK Stitch 'n Bitch Day 2007 where she hosted a workshop, fashion parade and book launch for the fourth in her Stitch 'n Bitch book series: Son of Stitch 'n Bitch.

== Bibliography ==
- Karp, Marcelle; Stoller, Debbie, eds. (1999). The Bust Guide to the New Girl Order. Penguin. ISBN 0-14-027774-9.
- Stitch 'n Bitch: The Knitter's Handbook. Workman Publishing Co. 2003. ISBN 0-7611-2818-2.
- Stitch 'n Bitch Nation. Workman Publishing Co. 2004. ISBN 0-7611-3590-1.
- Stitch 'n Bitch :A Knitter's Design Journal. Workman Publishing Co. 2005. ISBN 0-7611-3833-1.
- Stitch 'n Bitch Crochet: The Happy Hooker. Workman Publishing Co. 2006. ISBN 0-7611-3986-9.
- Stitch 'n Bitch 2007 Page-A-Day Calendar. Workman Publishing Co. 2006. ISBN 0-7611-4288-6.
- Son of Stitch 'n Bitch : 45 Projects to Knit and Crochet for Men. Workman Publishing Co. 2007. ISBN 978-0-7611-4617-9.
- Stitch 'n Bitch 2008 Page-A-Day Calenda r. Workman Publishing Co. 2007. ISBN 978-0-7611-4573-8.
- Stitch 'n Bitch Superstar Knitting. Workman Publishing Co. 2010. ISBN 978-0-7611-3597-5.
- Stoller, Debbie; Henzel, Laurie (2011). The BUST DIY Guide to Life: Making Your Way Through Every Day. Stewart, Tabori and Chang. ISBN 978-1584798965.
