= Jude Doyle =

American writer (born 1982)

Jude Ellison Sady Doyle
- Born: June 11, 1982 (age 44)
- Education: The New School
- Occupation: Author
- Years active: 2008–present

Jude Ellison Sady Doyle, formerly published as Sady Doyle, born June 11, 1982, is an American feminist author.

== Career ==
In 2005, Doyle graduated from Eugene Lang College. He founded the blog Tiger Beatdown (referencing Tiger Beat) in 2008. It concluded in 2013. His 2010 critique of Liz Lemon on Tiger Beatdown was oft-cited. Alyssa Rosenberg, writing for ThinkProgress in 2011, criticized Doyle's critique in Tiger Beatdown that year of the sexual violence in Game of Thrones.

Doyle is a feminist author; his first book, titled Trainwreck: The Women We Love to Hate, Mock, and Fear... and Why (2016), dealt with the ways in which society, and especially the media, have built up (and spotlighted) and then torn down women who defied social norms throughout history, particularly by classifying them as "crazy" and "trainwrecks". His second book, Dead Blondes and Bad Mothers: Monstrosity, Patriarchy, and the Fear of Female Power, about patriarchy, monsters, and the horror of being female, was released in August 2019, and deals with the roles women are often pushed into by society, and the ways women are seen as monsters. In 2020, he published the teenage horror comedy book Apocalypse 1999 Or The Devil in Jenny Long, offering it as a free download via the book's website. In 2025 Doyle’s book about not leaving feminism after coming out as transgender, titled DILF: Did I Leave Feminism?, was published.

Doyle contributed "The Pathology of Donald Trump" to the 2017 anthology Nasty Women: Feminism, Resistance, and Revolution in Trump's America, edited by Samhita Mukhopadhyay and Kate Harding, and the piece “Nowhere Left to Go: Misogyny and Belief on the Left“ to the 2020 anthology Believe Me: How Trusting Women Can Change the World, edited by Jessica Valenti and Jaclyn Friedman, as well as contributing to Rookie – Yearbook One (2012), Rookie – Yearbook Two (2014), and The Book of Jezebel: An Illustrated Encyclopedia of Lady Things (2013). Doyle also edited and wrote the introduction for Marilyn Monroe: The Last Interview: and Other Conversations (2020). His piece "The Healed Body", about In My Skin, is part of the anthology It Came from the Closet: Queer Reflections on Horror, published on October 4, 2022.

Doyle was a staff writer for In These Times and Rookie, and has also written for other outlets including The Guardian, Elle, The Atlantic, and NBCNews.com. Doyle has written extensively about sexual assault and the misogynistic abuse that many women face online, which Doyle has also endured.

He wrote the comic MAW, which was a five-issue horror series, the last issue of which came out in January 2022. The comic was released by BOOM! Studios. Doyle also wrote the horror comic series The Neighbors, released by BOOM! Studios in 2023, which was nominated for Outstanding Comic Book at the 35th GLAAD Media Awards. He was one of the writers for the comic Hello Darkness #1, released by BOOM! Studios in July 2024. His story for that comic was called "Contagious". In June 2025 the horror comic series he wrote called Be Not Afraid premiered; it was released by BOOM! Studios. He was also a writer for DC PRIDE 2025 #1, which won Best Anthology at the 2026 Eisner Awards. He also wrote the five-issue comic book series Dead Teenagers, the first issue of which came out in March 2026, and the six-issue comic book series Clayface: Celebrity Dirt, the first issue of which came out in July 2026.

He also worked on the libretto for the musical Queen of Hearts about Martin Bashir’s interview with Diana, Princess of Wales; the musical premiered October 20, 2022.

== Social media activities ==
In 2010, Doyle started the #MooreandMe campaign against Michael Moore's rejection of rape allegations made about Julian Assange. In 2011, Doyle started the hashtag #mencallmethings as a way to further discussion of sexist abuse received by women writers on the Internet. The same year, Doyle received the first Women's Media Center Social Media Award. In 2013, Kurt Metzger feuded with Doyle and Lindy West via Facebook and Twitter during a defense of rape humor.

== Personal life ==
Doyle is a gay transgender man. He wrote that in April 2022 he had top surgery.

He has described himself as “a stunning example of the neurodiversity found in nature”.

He stated that he was sexually assaulted, and that his father was abusive and almost killed him, his mother, and his brother. Doyle also mentioned having post-traumatic stress disorder.

Doyle has a husband and a daughter.
