= Cisnormativity =

Assumption that everyone is cisgender

Cisnormativity or cissexual assumption is the assumption that everyone is, or ought to be, cisgender. The term can further refer to a wider range of presumptions about gender assignment, such as the presumption of a gender binary, or expectations of conformity to gender roles even when transgender identities are otherwise acknowledged. Cisnormativity is a form of cisgenderism, an ideology which promotes various normative ideas about gender, to the invalidation of individuals' own gender identities, analogous to heterosexism or ableism.

Cisnormativity is widespread in many areas of society. In speech, cisnormativity manifests as a separation of cisgender and transgender people where cisgender individuals are considered normal and transgender people, an exception. In institutions, cisnormativity may be seen in the ways gender transition is legally regulated, and in the binary division of legal gender in most jurisdictions; schools often enforce a strict division between genders, which leads to the stigmatization of transgender people. Cisnormativity also motivates bullying and harassment in educational settings. In health care, cisnormative attitudes and systems have diverse negative effects on transgender patients, including pathologization, erasure, and distrust towards healthcare practitioners.

Cisnormativity is closely tied to heteronormativity. The combination of the two, termed hetero-cis-normativity or cisheteronormativity, (Note: These two terms have been used interchangeably in literature.) represents the societally dominant view that sex, gender, and sexual orientation are all congruent.

== Definition ==
The term cisnormativity was coined in a 2009 article published in the Journal of the Association of Nurses in AIDS Care (JANAC), which defines cisnormativity as "the expectation that all people are cissexual". The SAGE Encyclopedia of Trans Studies states that cisnormativity is "the presumption that most people do, or should, conform to the norms about gender assignment in their society". It elaborates: "'cisnormative' behavior varies depending on the gender norms in place within a given society. For example, in some societies, having only 'woman' and 'man' as gender categories would not be cisnormative".

In 2007, transfeminist author Julia Serano wrote in Whipping Girl that "[cissexual assumption] occurs when a cissexual makes the common, albeit mistaken, assumption that the way they experience their physical and subconscious sexes [...] applies to everyone else in the world". She argues that cisgender people "indiscriminately project" their experience of gender identity onto all others, "transforming cissexuality into a human attribute that is taken for granted".

A related concept is that of cisgenderism (also known as cissexism), defined by Erica Lennon and Brian J. Millster writing for Transgender Studies Quarterly as "the cultural and systemic ideology that denies, denigrates, or pathologizes self-identified gender identities that do not align with assigned gender at birth as well as resulting behavior, expression, and community". Cisgenderism was proposed as an alternative concept to transphobia, with the intention of drawing focus to a systemic ideology, rather than an individual "phobia". This draws from the earlier distinction between heterosexism and homophobia. According to The SAGE Encyclopedia, cisnormativity is one form of cisgenderism.

Academic literature identifies cisnormativity as intersectional with endosexism, sexism, heterosexism, bisexual erasure, classism, racism, ageism, and nationalism. Cisnormativity contributes to patriarchy by providing a rigid division of people into genders and gender roles.

Cisnormativity often appears together with heteronormativity. According to Judith Butler, the dominant view of gender assumes a "causal continuity among sex, gender, and desire". In 2012, sociologist Meredith Worthen coined the term hetero-cis-normativity (Note: This concept has also been interchangeably called cisheteronormativity.) for this phenomenon:

I identify hetero-cis-normativity as a system of norms, privilege, and oppression that organizes social power around sexual identity and gender identity whereby heterosexual cisgender people are situated above all others and thus, LGBTQ people are in a place of systemic disadvantage.

According to Worthen, hetero-cis-normativity is a model to explain antipathy towards LGBT people, and transphobia may be a symptom thereof.

== Manifestations ==
Sex-segregated spaces may reinforce cisnormativity.

According to the 2009 JANAC article, "Cisnormative assumptions are so prevalent that they are difficult at first to even recognize", and "cisnormativity shapes social activity such as child rearing, the policies and practices of individuals and institutions, and the organization of the broader social world". Cisgender people, especially men, who follow cisnormative norms are privileged over people who do not, especially non-binary people. Cisnormativity can also affect cisgender people who do not conform to gender roles.

=== Misgendering ===
In language, cisnormativity can cause erasure of transgender people's identities, or highlight them as separate from cisgender people. Misgendering, the act of referring to a transgender person in a manner inconsistent with their gender identity, is a manifestation of cisnormativity. Cisnormativity is present in the way cisgender people are referred to without qualification as "men" or "women", while trans individuals often are consistently referred to as trans men or women, regardless of context. That is, being cisgender is considered normal, while being trans requires clarification. In this way, cisnormativity "disallows the possibility of trans existence or trans visibility". Serano suggests cisnormativity as the foremost cause of trans erasure, whereby the experiences of transgender people are made invisible in the public eye. Influenced by cisnormativity, people may construe society and its institutions as devoid of transgender people, even though gender variance is a common feature in all of history.

=== Interactions with institutions ===
The SAGE Encyclopedia of Trans Studies cites as examples of cisnormativity in legislation laws mandating mental health diagnoses to receive gender-affirming treatments or to have one's gender legally recognized, and laws requiring a trans person to be sterilized before they can change their legal gender. Cisnormative administrative systems enforce, and treat as important, binary gender systems that are ill-fitting for transgender people and cause both hypervisibility and erasure. This may be especially problematic for transgender migrants. Cisnormativity may contribute to and be informed by colonizing and ethnocentric views when biological realities and social norms are conflated. It also informs attacks on the field of gender studies, the anti-gender movement as well as trans-exclusionary radical feminism.

=== Education ===
Cisnormativity is prevalent in schools. Schools often divide students into binary genders, and perpetuate the idea that boys and girls have respective sets of mutually exclusive "attributes, aptitudes, abilities, and desires". Cisnormativity in schools privileges cisgender and stigmatizes transgender children. School policies may erase transgender people, for example by administrative procedures, uniform rules, toilet layouts and curricula. Cisnormatively motivated microaggressions as well as bullying and harassment are well documented in schools. The kinds of cisnormative violence experienced by transgender students include verbal and physical abuse and sexual harassment. These factors have been linked to worsened emotional and psychological health, lowered ability to participate at school, as well as increased stress among transgender students. Transgender people are also commonly erased in sex education, and many do not have access to trans-inclusive sexual health information.

=== Passing ===
Strategies like passing or "going stealth" (not telling people that one is transgender) may be used by transgender people to avoid the disadvantages brought by cisnormativity in the workplace. Non-binary people may adopt preferred gender pronouns that fit with cisnormativity for the same purpose. These strategies reduce discrimination, but also perpetuate cisnormativity further.

=== Health care ===
Cisnormative health care systems privilege the needs of cisgender people over those of transgender people. Trans women are doubly affected, by both cisnormativity and male privilege in health care. The expectation of passing in medical contexts is a product of, and reinforces, cisnormativity. In psychiatry, transgender people may be pathologized, a result of a cisnormative conception of gender. This results in transgender people being neglected or invalidated in medical and psychological research, and such research has even attempted to justify conversion therapy against transgender people. Blanchard's transsexualism typology has been criticized as cisnormative.

Cisnormativity also causes trans erasure in health care context, such that medical institutions are unready to treat transgender patients. When a trans patient does seek help, they are seen as an anomaly that disrupts the system. Health care providers often lack education and thus awareness about transgender topics, which causes them to be unprepared to treat transgender people. In 2015, 24% of transgender survey respondents in the United States reported having to educate health care providers about transgender health. Transgender people often feel unwelcome in sex-segregated wards or clinics, and some report being outright dismissed by doctors, or asked to seek help elsewhere, upon revealing that they are transgender. Past or anticipated experiences in cisnormative health care systems cause some transgender people to shy away from health care. According to the 2021 Trans Lives Survey report, 57% of respondents in the United Kingdom avoided seeing a doctor when ill. Some transgender people also avoid disclosing their transgender status to clinicians for fear of mistreatment; this may cause further problems due to inappropriate treatments, or from unintentional revelation of the patient's sex during examination.

=== Internalized transphobia ===
Among transgender people, cisnormativity may result in internalized transphobia, and influence who is considered authentically transgender and who is not. Some transgender people restrict whom they consider transgender by cisnormative criteria such as experiencing or being diagnosed with gender dysphoria, or desiring certain kinds of gender-affirming care. Others reject cisnormativity by focusing on self-identification as the criterion for being trans. A person's gender identity may be connected to the extent of their cisnormative attitudes. Cisgender men are more invested in cisnormativity than cisgender women, who are more likely to be open to gender fluidity, and transgender people have a more critical consciousness about cisnormativity than cisgender people.

=== Gender binary ===
Non-binary people as a group are more stigmatized than many other LGBT identities. Cisnormativity can inspire negative attitudes towards non-binary identities, such as the idea that they should "just pick" either masculinity or femininity. Gender fluidity can confuse both cisgender and transgender people, leading to negative attitudes. Cisgender men may be more likely to exhibit such views, as less latitude is afforded to them with regard to gender roles than to cisgender women.

== See also ==
- Gender essentialism
- Mononormativity
- Transmedicalism
- Implicit stereotype
