= BCSC =

BCSC may refer to:

- British Cycling
- British Columbia Supreme Court
- British Columbia Securities Commission
- British Council of Shopping Centres
- Bachelor's degree in Computer Science, normally abbreviated B.Comp.Sc.
- Bartholomew Consolidated School Corporation, the organization that encompasses all schools, elementary, middle and secondary in the Columbus, Indiana, area
- Brown Center for Students of Color
