= Cisgender =

Gender identity descriptor

The word cisgender (often shortened to cis; sometimes cissexual) describes a person whose gender identity corresponds to their sex assigned at birth (i.e., someone who is not transgender). The prefix cis- is Latin and means on this side of. The term cisgender was coined in 1994 as an antonym to transgender, and entered into dictionaries starting in 2015 as a result of changes in social discourse about gender.

Related concepts are cisnormativity (the presumption that cisgender identity is preferred or normal) and cissexism (bias or prejudice favoring cisgender people).

== Etymology ==
The term cisgender was derived from the Latin prefix cis-, meaning 'on this side of', which is the opposite of trans-, meaning 'across from' or 'on the other side of'. This usage can be seen in the ancient Roman term Cisalpine Gaul, meaning Gaul on this side of the Alps, to refer to then Gallic or Celtic Northern Italy, as opposed to Transalpine Gaul, i.e. Gaul on the other side or across the Alps (from Roman-centric point of view), i.e. what is now France. This usage was subsequently adapted to make other distinctions such as Cisjordan–Transjordan, the cis–trans distinction in chemistry, and the cis and trans sides of the Golgi apparatus in cellular biology. In cisgender, cis- describes the alignment of gender identity with assigned sex.

== History and usage of the term ==
=== Coinage ===
==== German ====
Marquis Bey states that "proto-cisgender discourse" arose in German in 1914, when Ernst Burchard introduced the cis/trans distinction to sexology by contrasting "cisvestitismus, or a type of inclination to wear gender-conforming clothing, [...] with transvestitismus, or cross-dressing." German sexologist Volkmar Sigusch used the term cissexual (zissexuell in German) in his two-part 1991 article "Die Transsexuellen und unser nosomorpher Blick" ("Transsexuals and our nosomorphic view"); in 1998, he said he had coined the term there.

==== English ====
The term cisgender was coined in English in 1994 in a Usenet newsgroup about transgender topics as Dana Defosse, then a graduate student, sought a way to refer to non-transgender people that avoided marginalizing transgender people or implying that transgender people were an other. John Hollister used it that same year. In 1995, Carl Buijs used it, apparently coining it independently.

=== Academic use ===
Medical academics use the term and have recognized its importance in transgender studies since the 1990s. After the terms cisgender and cissexual were used in a 2006 article in the Journal of Lesbian Studies and Serano's 2007 book Whipping Girl, the former gained further popularity among English-speaking activists and scholars. Cisgender was added to the Oxford English Dictionary in 2015, defined as "designating a person whose sense of personal identity corresponds to the sex and gender assigned to him or her at birth (in contrast with transgender)". Perspectives on History states that since this inclusion, the term has increasingly become common usage.

=== Social media ===
In the late 1990s, cisgender was popularized on USENET by Laura Blake, who used it prolifically when debating with other users and emphasized the term's linguistic grounding in social constructionism. Blake's concept of a "cisgender ideal" as foundational to transphobia was influential for other transgender Internet users.

In February 2014, Facebook began offering "custom" gender options, allowing users to identify with one or more gender-related terms from a selected list, including cis, cisgender, and others.

== Definitions ==
Sociologists Kristen Schilt and Laurel Westbrook define cisgender as a label for "individuals who have a match between the gender they were assigned at birth, their bodies, and their personal identity". A number of derivatives of the terms cisgender and cissexual include cis male for "male assigned male at birth", cis female for "female assigned female at birth", analogously cis man and cis woman, and cissexism and cissexual assumption or cisnormativity (akin to heteronormativity). Eli R. Green wrote in 2006, "cisgendered is used [instead of the more popular gender normative] to refer to people who do not identify with a gender diverse experience, without enforcing existence of a normative gender expression".

Others have similarly argued that using terms such as man or woman to mean cis man or cis woman reinforced cisnormativity, and that instead using the prefix cis similarly to trans would counteract the cisnormative connotations within language.

Julia Serano has defined cissexual as "people who are not transsexual and who have only ever experienced their mental and physical sexes as being aligned", while cisgender is a slightly narrower term for those who do not identify as transgender (a larger cultural category than the more clinical transsexual). For Jessica Cadwallader, cissexual is "a way of drawing attention to the unmarked norm, against which trans is identified, in which a person feels that their gender identity matches their body/sex".

Serano also uses the related term cissexism, "which is the belief that transsexuals' identified genders are inferior to, or less authentic than, those of cissexuals". In 2010, the term cisgender privilege appeared in academic literature, defined as the "set of unearned advantages that individuals who identify as the gender they were assigned at birth accrue solely due to having a cisgender identity".

== Critiques ==
While intended to be a positive descriptor to distinguish between trans and non-trans identity, the term has been met with criticisms in more recent years.

=== From feminism and gender studies ===
Krista Scott-Dixon wrote in 2009 that she preferred "the term non-trans to other options such as cissexual/cisgendered", saying non-trans is clearer to average people.

Women's and gender studies scholar Mimi Marinucci writes that some consider the 'cisgender–transgender' binary distinction to be as dangerous or self-defeating as the masculine–feminine gender binary because it lumps people who identify as lesbian, gay, or bisexual (LGB) together (over-simplistically, in her view) with a heteronormative class of people in an opposition with transgender people; she says that characterizing LGB individuals together with heterosexual, non-trans people may problematically suggest that LGB individuals, unlike transgender individuals, "experience no mismatch between their own gender identity and gender expression and cultural expectations regarding gender identity and expression".

Gender studies professor Chris Freeman criticizes the term, describing it as "clunky, unhelpful and maybe even regressive" and saying it "‍creates – or re-creates – a gender binary".

=== From intersex organizations ===
Intersex people are born with atypical physical sex characteristics that can complicate initial sex assignment and lead to involuntary or coercive medical treatment. The term cisgender "can get confusing" in relation to people with intersex conditions, although some intersex people use the term according to the Interact Advocates for Intersex Youth Inter/Act project. Hida Viloria of Intersex Campaign for Equality notes that, as a person born with an intersex body who has a non-binary sense of gender identity that "matches" their body, they are both cisgender and gender non-conforming, presumably opposites according to cisgender's definition, and that this evidences the term's basis on a binary sex model that does not account for intersex people's existence. Viloria also critiques the fact that the term sex assigned at birth is used in one of cisgender's definitions without noting that babies are assigned male or female regardless of intersex status in most of the world, stating that doing so obfuscates the birth of intersex babies and frames gender identity within a binary male/female sex model that fails to account for both the existence of natally congruent gender non-conforming gender identities, and gender-based discrimination against intersex people based on natal sex characteristics rather than on gender identity or expression, such as "normalizing" infant genital surgeries.

=== From owners of media outlets ===
In June 2023, Elon Musk, owner of social network Twitter (now X), stated that use of the words "cis" and "cisgender" on the platform as "targeted harassment" would constitute violations of its hateful content policy, as he considered them to be slurs. The changes came following an interaction between Musk and a gender-critical commentator, who alleged that pro-trans advocates were using forms of the word (such as "cissy", a variant of the pejorative sissy) to insult him following a post in which he rejected the term. Musk has since described cisgender as being "heterophobic" and a "heterosexual slur". The change came amid the loosening of other rules protecting LGBT users under his ownership, including removing rules prohibiting deadnaming.

=== Responses to critiques ===
After the Oxford Dictionary added cisgender as a word in 2015, The Advocate wrote that "even among LGBT people, the word is hotly debated"; transgender veteran Brynn Tannehill argued that it was "often used in a negative way" by trans people to express "a certain level of contempt" for people they think should not partake in discussions on trans issues. Transgender scholar K.J. Rawson, by contrast, stated that "cis" was "not meant to be dismissive, but rather descriptive", and was no different than using the word "straight" to describe people who are heterosexual. Rawson explained that people who are straight "don't typically experience their heterosexuality as an identity, many don't identify as heterosexual—they don't need to, because culture has already done that for them", and that "similarly, cisgender people don't generally identify as cisgender because societal expectations already presume that they are."

In a 2023 essay, Defosse said she did not intend the word as an insult. She says she does not believe the word cisgender caused problems, and that "it only revealed them."

== See also ==
- Endosex
- Sex–gender distinction
- Gender taxonomy
- Cisnormativity
