= Genderism =

Genderism may refer to:

- Cisgenderism, the belief in enforcing the gender binary and gender essentialism
- "Gender ideology", a catch-all term for issues opposed by the anti-gender movement
- Sexism, prejudice or discrimination based on one's sex or gender

== See also ==
- Postgenderism, a social, political, and cultural movement advocating for the elimination of gender in society
