= Whipping Girl =

2007 book on transgender issues by Julia Serano

- Cover of the first edition
- Author: Julia Serano
- Language: English
- Subject: Transfeminism
- Published: 2007 (Seal Press)
- Publication place: United States
- Media type: Print
- Pages: 408 (first edition)
- ISBN: 1-580-05154-5
- OCLC: 81252738

Whipping Girl: A Transsexual Woman on Sexism and the Scapegoating of Femininity is a 2007 book by the gender studies writer, biologist, and writer Julia Serano. The book is a transfeminist manifesto that makes the case that transphobia is rooted in sexism and that transgender activism is a feminist movement.

The book has been translated into Japanese, Spanish, and French. A second edition of the book was published in March 2016 with a new preface, and a third edition was published in March 2024 with an additional afterword.

== Background ==
In 2004, Serano wrote her first essay, Skirt Chasers: Why the Media Depicts the Trans Revolution in Lipstick and Heels, appearing in Bitch magazine in the fall of that year.

In 2005, Serano self-published a 36-page chapbook called On the Outside Looking In: A Trans Woman's Perspective on Feminism and the Exclusion of Trans Women from Lesbian and Women-only Spaces, eventually being formally published by Hot Tranny Action Press. It contains Skirt Chasers, as well as three other essays that would eventually form the foundation for the chapters of Whipping Girl.

In the introduction to Whipping Girl, Serano says that she chose the title "to highlight the ways in which people who are feminine, whether they be female, male, and/or transgender, are almost universally demeaned compared with their masculine counterparts."

== Terminology ==
The book discusses transmisogyny, which is the intersection of misogyny with transphobia, directed toward trans women. Serano also explores trans-objectification, trans-facsimilation, trans-sexualization, trans-interrogation, trans-erasure, trans-exclusion, and trans-mystification.

She argues that sexism in Western culture is a twofold phenomenon, comprising traditional sexism, "the belief that maleness and masculinity are superior to femaleness and femininity", and oppositional sexism, "the belief that female and male are rigid, mutually exclusive categories".

Serano coins the term effemimania (from effeminacy) to describe the societal obsession with male and transfeminine expressions of femininity—an obsession that she claims is rooted in transmisogyny.

== Themes ==
In a collection of essays, Serano seeks to deconstruct Western societal narratives about trans women, including those of academia, medicine, and the media. She frequently cites her personal experiences as a lesbian trans woman.

Serano argues that "oppositional sexism" is a driving force behind cissexism, transphobia, and homophobia. In addition to oppositional sexism, she writes that traditional sexism is the second requirement for "maintaining a male-centered gender hierarchy."

Serano uses the term cissexual assumption to describe the belief among cisgender people that everyone experiences gender identity in the same way.

In her book, Serano argued that cisgender people, neither lacking discomfort with their gender assigned at birth, nor thinking of themselves as or wishing they could become a different gender, project that experience onto all other people. Thus, it is argued, they are assuming that everyone they meet is cisgender, and "thus transforming cissexuality into a human attribute that is taken for granted". Serano wrote that cissexual assumption is invisible to most cisgender people, but "those of us who are transsexual are excruciatingly aware of it."

== Intrinsic inclinations model ==
Serano's argument of intrinsic inclinations was discussed in great detail in the book, taking the entirety of the sixth chapter, with much of the rest of the book relying on an understanding of this model in order to discuss the presence and place of trans women in feminism. The intrinsic inclinations model is an idea of gender and how there came to be the variation that exists amongst people in modern society. The idea that there are both biological and social factors at play in the variation that occurs in sexual orientation, gender identity, and gender expression is at the core of the intrinsic inclinations model, and it is how Serano attempts to explain both the typical and atypical forms of each of the three traits. This model is built upon four basic tenets.

The first tenet of this model, the model's core that everything that follows is built upon, is the fact that "subconscious sex, gender expression, and sexual orientation represent separate gender inclinations that are determined largely independent of one another." The assumption that these three things are determined individually allows for the natural variation that exists amongst people to be explained easily, as it is now simply a matter of explaining individual traits rather than trying to explain things for a society as a whole, and it allows this model to be able to explain exceptions to typical forms of gender expression without crushing the entire model.

The second tenet of the model, and where the model gets its name, is the assumption that "these gender inclinations are, to some extent, intrinsic to our persons ... and generally remain intact despite societal influences and conscious attempts by individuals to purge, repress, or ignore them." Serano argues that it is because these traits are naturally occurring, the differences present in society simply represent the natural variation that is also found in numerous other species.

The third tenet simply states that since there has not been one single factor that has been determined to cause any of these gender inclinations, these traits have multiple factors that determine and make them up, and, as such, a range of possible outcomes should be accepted rather than discrete classes (such as masculine and feminine).

The fourth and final tenet of this model states that "each of these inclinations roughly correlates with physical sex, resulting in a bimodal distribution pattern (i.e., two overlapping bell curves) similar to that seen for other gender differences, such as height." This idea is what allows for the natural exceptions to gender expression to exist within the system without attempting to claim that they exist in as high of numbers as typical gender expression.
