= Samhita Mukhopadhyay =

American writer and editor

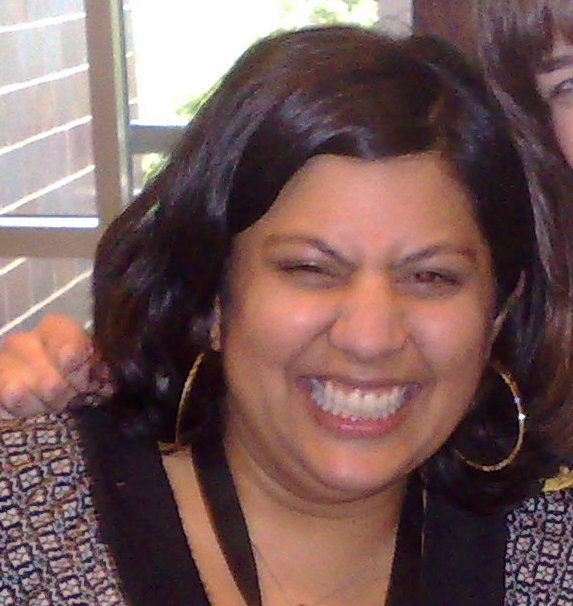
- Born: May 3, 1978 (age 48)
- Education: San Francisco State University (MA)
- Occupations: Writer, editor
- Years active: 2005–present
- Employer: Teen Vogue
- Notable work: Outdated: Why Dating is Ruining Your Love Life (2011); Nasty Women: Feminism, Resistance and Revolution in Trump's America (ed., 2017)
- Website: samhitamukhopadhyay.com

Samhita Mukhopadhyay (born May 3, 1978) is an American writer and former executive editor of Teen Vogue. She writes about feminism, culture, race, politics, and dating. She is the author of Outdated: Why Dating is Ruining Your Love Life and the co-editor of the anthology, Nasty Women: Feminism, Resistance, and Revolution in Trump's America.

== Career ==
The child of immigrants from India, Mukhopadhyay was raised in New York City.

She started blogging in 2005.

In 2008, Mukhopadhyay contributed an essay on the sexualization of black women to Jaclyn Friedman and Jessica Valenti's anthology Yes Means Yes: Visions of Female Sexual Empowerment.

Mukhopadhyay earned a master's degree in Women and Gender Studies in 2009 from San Francisco State University, where her thesis was entitled "The Politics of the Feminist Blogosphere."

Mukhopadhyay is the former Executive Editor of the blog Feministing.com and former Senior Editorial Director of Culture and Identities at millennial media platform Mic.

In February 2018, Mukhopadhyay was named executive editor at Teen Vogue, following Elaine Welteroth's departure from Condé Nast.

In 2022, after stepping down from Teen Vogue, Mukhopadhyay was named a MacDowell Fellow.

=== Books ===
In 2011, Mukhopadhyay published her first book, Outdated: Why Dating is Ruining Your Love Life, a feminist intervention to mainstream dating books.

In 2017, Mukhopadhyay co-edited an anthology with Kate Harding entitled Nasty Women: Feminism, Resistance and Revolution in Trump's America. Mukhopadhyay wrote the introduction to the collection of essays, in which prominent feminists discussed the impact of Donald Trump's election on hard-fought wins for gender, race, sexuality, class and ethnicity.

== Bibliography ==
- Outdated: Why Dating is Ruining Your Love Life (Seal, 2011)
- Nasty Women: Feminism, Resistance and Revolution in Trump's America, ed. with Kate Harding (Picador, 2017)
