= Why Have Kids? =

Book by Jessica Valenti

- Author: Jessica Valenti
- Language: English
- Published: September 4, 2012
- Publisher: New Harvest
- Publication place: United States
- ISBN: 978-0-54789-261-0
- Preceded by: The Purity Myth (2009)
- Followed by: Sex Object: A Memoir (2016)

Why Have Kids?: A New Mom Explores the Truth About Parenting and Happiness is a 2012 book by feminist writer Jessica Valenti. Already the author of four books, Valenti wrote the book during her first year of motherhood, after giving birth to her first child via C-section three months before her due date. The book discusses motherhood from Valenti's third-wave feminist perspective, diving into gender roles and increased individualism in parenting.

The book was called "a politicized, anti-What to Expect When You're Expecting" by Publishers Weekly.

== Background ==
Valenti got the idea to write the book while pregnant with her daughter in 2011. Two days after first discussing it with her editor, she was rushed to the hospital and delivered her daughter prematurely at just 28 weeks, the baby weighing just two pounds. The birth left Valenti with a sense of failure about not living up to the ideal of a healthy birth and a healthy baby.

== Synopsis ==
The book is composed of short chapters presented in two parts: Truth and Lies.
