= Feministing =

Feminist blog

- Website type: Blog
- Creators: Jessica Valenti, Vanessa Valenti
- Editor: Maya Dusenbery (Executive Director for Editorial)
- Website: feministing.com
- Registration: Optional
- Launched: 2004
- Current status: Not active

Feministing.com was a feminist blog founded in 2004 by sisters Jessica and Vanessa Valenti. It had 1.2 million unique monthly visitors at its peak. The blog helped to popularize the term slut-shaming according to its directors Lori Adelman and Maya Dusenbery. Towards the end of 2019 it was announced that the blog's shutdown was planned for the following weeks. The blog's final post was published in December 2019.

== Purpose and audience ==
Sisters Vanessa and Jessica Valenti began Feministing in 2004 while working at the National Organization for Women's legal defense fund (now Legal Momentum), where Jessica felt that young feminists were being excluded from feminist discourse. She describes Feministing's purpose as "a way to get through the mommy filter" and make feminism more accessible to young women through giving an Internet presence for young feminists. Feministing covers topics ranging from outrage on measures to restrict reproductive rights or pay equity to irreverent or bemused coverage of pop culture and art, such as urinals shaped to look like vaginas.

The writing on Feministing was not exclusively political but also concerned feminist perspectives and observations from the staff's daily lives. Sex and sexuality were another frequent topic of discussion; it is sometimes cited as an Internet extension of the third-wave feminist movement. It was popular among young feminists. Feministing also had a comments section. Readers posted (sometimes heated) comments on posts by the editorial board and posted their own writing at their community portal.

== Staff ==
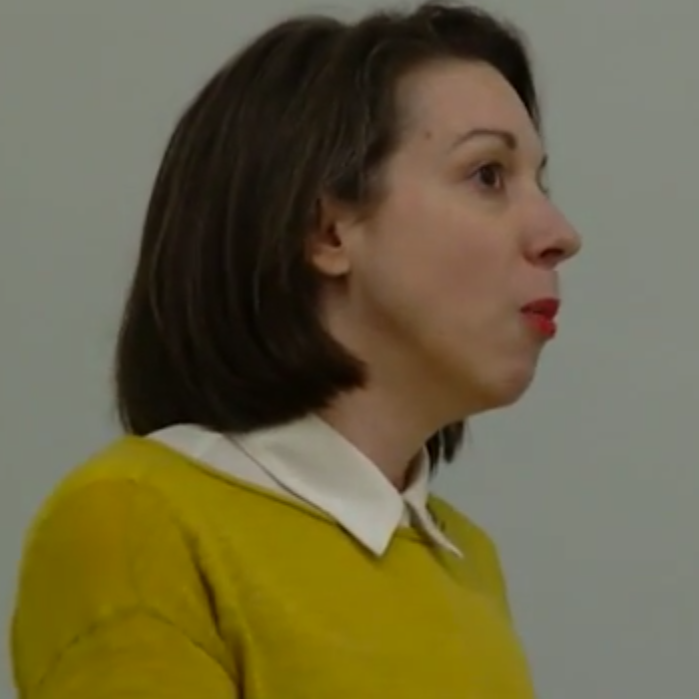
Gwendolyn Beetham

As of September 2013, Feministing had three co-executive directors: Lori Adelman (Partnerships), Maya Dusenbery (Editorial), and Jos Truitt (Development). In 2015 Adelman was named as one of The Forward 50. Alexandra Brodsky is an editor and columnist. The other staff columnists were Chloe Angyal (Senior Columnist), Katie Halper, Syreeta McFadden, Sesali Bowen, Verónica Bayetti Flores, Juliana Britto Schwartz, Mychal Denzel Smith, Katherine Cross, Gwendolyn Beetham (Academic Feminist Columnist), Dana Bolger, and Suzanna Bobadilla (Interviews Columnist). The site was supported by advertisements but all of the writers had day jobs. Former Feministing staff include former editors Vanessa Valenti, Ann Friedman, Miriam Zoila Pérez, Courtney E. Martin, and Samhita Mukhopadhyay.

=== Retirement of Jessica Valenti ===
Valenti retired from Feministing in 2011. In a statement issued on 2 February, Valenti announced her retirement, arguing that her intention for the site was to provide a space for younger feminists outside the elite. Valenti stated:

Today, almost 5,000 posts later, I'm a 32-year-old feminist with a voice that is listened to. Largely because of the work I've done with Feministing, I have a successful platform for my work – I've published books, written articles, and built a career as a speaker. Because I feel Feministing should remain a place for younger feminists to build their careers and platforms, I think it's appropriate to our mission that I step back.

Valenti continued to respond to articles using the comments forum, and Feministing writers frequently posted links to other work by both Valenti and Friedman.

== See also ==
- Courageous Cunts
- The F-Word (feminist blog)
