= Samantha Irby =

American comedian and writer

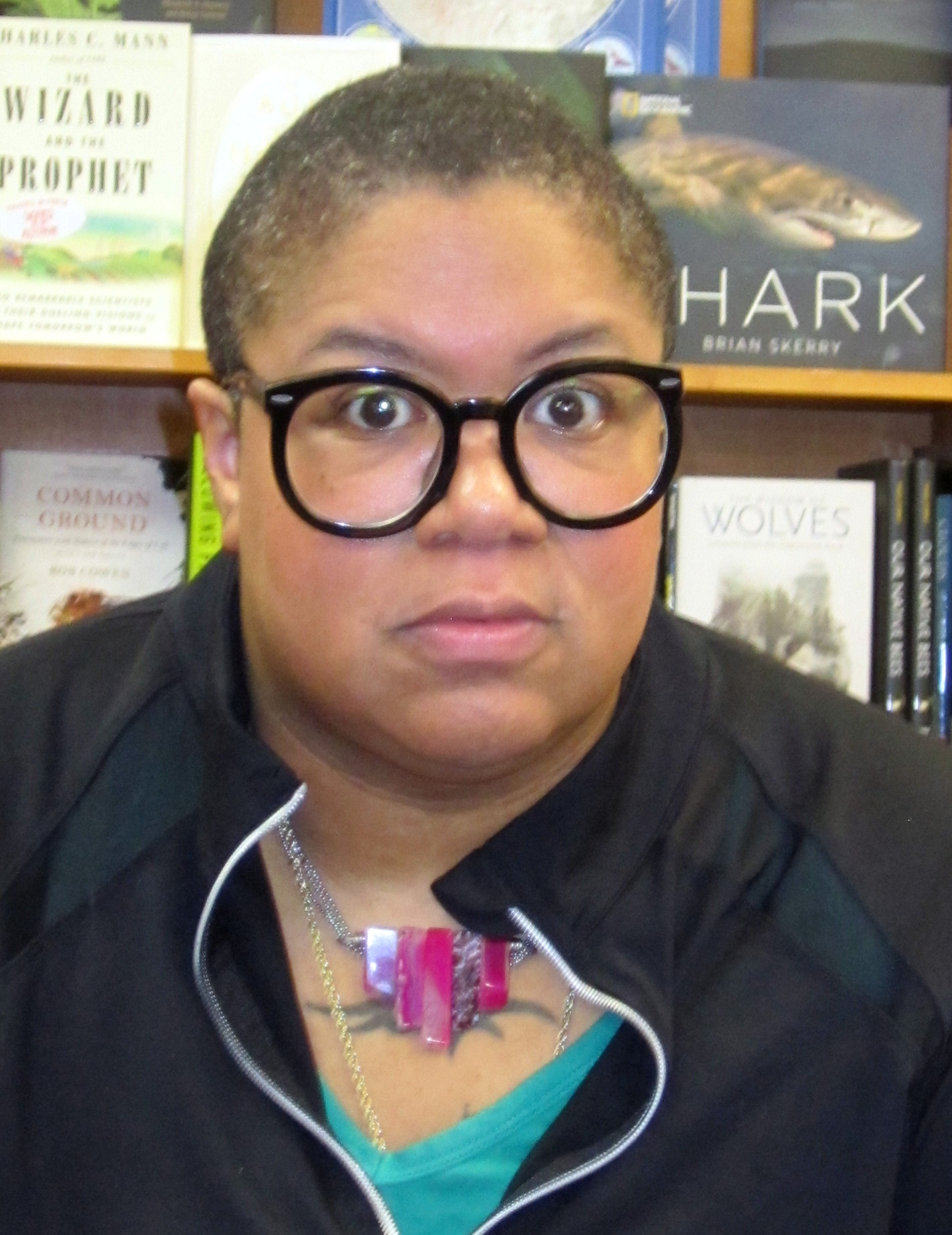
- Born: February 13, 1980
- Occupation: Comedian; writer
- Awards: Lambda Literary Awards
- Website: www.samanthairby.com

Samantha McKiver Irby (born February 13, 1980) is an American comedian, essayist, blogger, and television writer. She is the creator and author of the blog bitches gotta eat, where she writes humorous observations about her own life and modern society more broadly. Her books We Are Never Meeting in Real Life and Wow, No Thank You. were both New York Times best-sellers. She is a recipient of the 2021 Lambda Literary Award for bisexual nonfiction.

She has been a writer and/or co-producer for TV shows including HBO's Sex and the City reboot And Just Like That..., as well as Work in Progress, Shrill, and Tuca & Bertie. In 2016, FX announced that it had purchased the television rights to Irby's 2013 memoir Meaty and her blog, with the intent to adapt them into a series.

== Early life ==
Samantha McKiver Irby's middle name is her maternal grandmother's maiden name. She was born on February 13, 1980, and grew up in Evanston, Illinois. She attended Evanston Township High School. Her mother was a nurse.

In several interviews and books, Irby has discussed caring for her mother, who had multiple sclerosis, as a teenager. Irby attended Northern Illinois University, but dropped out after her mother's death. Her father was in and out of her life. His death—from hypothermia after suffering multiple heart attacks and strokes—happened six months before her mother's death. Irby began writing in the late 2000s when she started a Myspace blog.

== Work ==
In her blog bitches gotta eat, Irby offers an unvarnished and humorous accounting of challenges she has faced in her personal life and discusses various topics, including her sex life and battles with Crohn's disease. She began the blog in 2009.

Irby also co-hosted the live lit show Guts and Glory in Chicago with Keith Ecker until 2015, when the show ended its run.

She has co-hosted The Sunday Night Sex Show, performed in several shows, including The Paper Machete and Story Club, and her work has appeared in The Rumpus, In Our Words, and Jezebel.

Irby has published five books: We Are Never Meeting in Real Life; Meaty; New Year, Same Trash; Wow, No Thank You; and Quietly Hostile.

Meaty was published by Curbside Splendor Publishing in 2013, then republished in 2018 by Vintage Books. It is in development for adaptation as a television show on FX called Guts and Glory, with comedian Abbi Jacobson and writer Jessi Klein.

In 2017, Irby's second book, We Are Never Meeting in Real Life, was published by Vintage Books. It made The New York Times best-seller list for paperback nonfiction.

The fourth collection of essays, Wow, No Thank You, was released in March 2020. Irby stated on her social media pages that her book tour would be online due to COVID-19. The book debuted in the New York Times best-seller list's number one spot for Paperback Nonfiction.

In 2018, Irby wrote the fourth episode, "Pool", of the first season of Shrill. It was released on March 15, 2019.

In February 2021, Irby was announced as a co-producer and writer on And Just Like That..., the HBO reboot of Sex and the City. She was the lead writer of Season 1 Episode 5, "Tragically Hip."

Her essay collection Wow, No Thank You. won the Lambda Literary Award for Bisexual Non-Fiction at the 33rd Lambda Literary Awards in 2021.

In July 2021, Irby wrote an episode for the second season of Tuca & Bertie, "Vibe Check".

== Personal life ==
Irby married in 2016. Her wife is Kirsten Jennings. She now lives and works in Kalamazoo, Michigan.

Irby has been open about her struggles with Crohn's disease, degenerative arthritis, and depression, often discussing her experiences in her writing. She is friends with writers Roxane Gay and Lindy West.

== Bibliography ==
=== Books ===
- Meaty (2013, Curbside Splendor Publishing: ISBN 9780988825864: 2018, Vintage)
- New Year, Same Trash: Resolutions I Absolutely Did Not Keep (2017, Vintage, e-book: ISBN 9780525435150)
- We Are Never Meeting in Real Life (2017, Vintage: ISBN 9781101912195)
- "Country Crock" in Nasty Women: Feminism, Resistance, and Revolution in Trump's America (eds. Samhita Mukhopadhyay and Kate Harding, 2017, Picador: ISBN 9781250155504)
- Wow, No Thank You.: Essays, (March 2020, Vintage, ISBN 978-0525563488)
- Quietly Hostile (May 2023, Penguin Random House, ISBN 9780593315699)

=== Articles ===
- Irby, Samantha (March 27, 2023). "Please invite me to your party". Shouts & Murmurs. The New Yorker. 99 (6): 26–27.

———————

Bibliography notes
