= Danni Ashe =

American nude model and entrepreneur (born 1968)

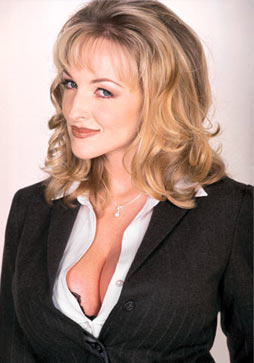
- Born: 1968 (age 57–58); Beaufort, South Carolina, U.S.
- Occupations: Entrepreneur; nude model; exotic dancer
- Known for: Softcore pornography website Danni's Hard Drive

Danni Ashe (born 1968) is an American former nude model and exotic dancer who founded Danni.com, a.k.a. Danni's Hard Drive, a popular softcore pornographic website, in the 1990s. She has been an industry advocate and testified before a government panel.

== Career ==
=== Early years ===
Ashe was born in Beaufort, South Carolina, United States. Her naturally large breasts (cup size 32FF) contributed to her popularity as an adult performer.

Ashe began working as a stripper in Seattle, Washington. Never finishing high school, she started stripping at the age of seventeen using a fake ID. In an interview, Ashe once explained her career choice: "I guess I'm an exhibitionist. But that's not quite true. Part of the reason is that I developed huge breasts at an early age and breasts are a very sexualized thing. At an early age, I was getting a lot of sexualized attention. Eventually, I just felt that stripping kind of put all that stuff out on the table."

After about five years of working in Seattle clubs, Ashe moved to Los Angeles, California and began modeling for men's magazines and softcore pornographic videos.

=== Internet ===
Her first online activity was confined to Usenet newsgroups during late 1994 and early 1995. In the spring of 1995, she decided to create her own website when her husband – then a senior vice president of the Landmark theater franchise – showed her his company's new website. When she could not find anyone competent to help her design her own site as she had envisioned it, Ashe read The HTML Manual of Style and Nicholas Negroponte's Being Digital during a vacation. On her return, she created the Danni.com (a.k.a. Danni's Hard Drive) website in two weeks.

The site was launched in July 1995 and contained content exclusive to her. Ashe announced the website to her friends prior to traveling to New York City with her husband. News of the site spread rapidly and hours later when she reached the hotel in Manhattan, Ashe had a message from her Internet service provider stating that the volume of traffic her site received had overloaded their servers and caused their system to shut down. Danni.com was moved to its own server, which became famous for having a "site working" light that never went out. Ashe jokingly described her server as a "hot box", and when she started charging a fee for access to the site, she named the members' area "The HotBox".

In 1997, Danni's Hard Drive had revenues of US$2.5 million. By 2001, the website had made a profit of $6.5 million the previous year, was projected to make $8 million that year, and was estimated to be worth US$30 million. She is the only woman in the world who appeared on the cover of both The Wall Street Journal and Juggs magazine. Ashe's business grew, allowing her to hire staff and models. By 2003, she had 50 full-time employees, a studio in Los Angeles (16,000 square feet [1,500 m^{2}]), and an archive containing hundreds of thousands of photos and thousands of hours of video. That year, Arena magazine ranked her fourth among the 50 most powerful people in porn. Ashe was making a million dollars a year.

Ashe sold Danni's Hard Drive in 2004. In 2006, Penthouse Media Group Inc. bought Danni.com and Video Bliss Inc. (owners of the website) for $3 million.

== Recognition ==
According to sociologists Chauntelle Tibbals and Meredith G. F. Worthen, Ashe is considered a pioneer in woman-centered centered pornography production, and one of the first people to see the internet's potential for marketing and distributing pornography. Ashe's website and exploits as an internet entrepreneur and a female executive were the subject of a 2000 book titled My Year in Smut: The Internet Escapades Inside Danni's Hard Drive by Taylor Marsh.

In August 2000, Ashe earned the status of "the most downloaded woman on the Internet" by the Guinness Book of World Records overtaking Cindy Margolis who had been given the title the previous year. Later that year the status was further supported with her image being downloaded for the billionth time on her website Danni.com.

== Appearances ==
Ashe was the subject of a May 2001 interview about the adult industry and her website. In the interview synopsis, Ashe is described as the "founder and CEO of Danni's Hard Drive, regarded as one of the most popular porn sites on the Internet", even though "her site offers only softcore pornography and does not feature any female-male sex." In the interview, Ashe discusses her audience, what she offers them, and how she is planning for growth in her business.

In 2004, Ashe was featured as herself on the HBO documentary series Pornucopia: Going Down in the Valley.

== Defamation lawsuit ==
In September 2013, Ashe filed suit against the newspaper and media outlet Daily Mail Online for an August 22, 2013, article posted under the headline "Porn Industry shuts down with immediate effect after 'female performer' tests positive for HIV" that was accompanied by an image of Ashe. In her filing, she claimed that the Daily Mail never sought permission to use her image and did not include a disclaimer or otherwise make clear that she was not the HIV-positive performer in question.

Citing millions of views and worldwide syndication of the article, Ashe was seeking US$3 million in damages. The Mail's London-based publisher Associated Newspapers, its parent A&N International Media, and its subsidiary DMGT were named as defendants. The online image was later removed and replaced with a blurry image of a different model, according to the 14-page lawsuit, but a requested retraction has not been published.

In July 2016, the U.S. 9th Circuit Court of Appeals (Los Angeles) ruled the Daily Mail had a case to answer to. In January 2017, it was reported the parties had settled out of court.
