= International Council of Shopping Centers =

Global trade association of the shopping center industry

ICSC
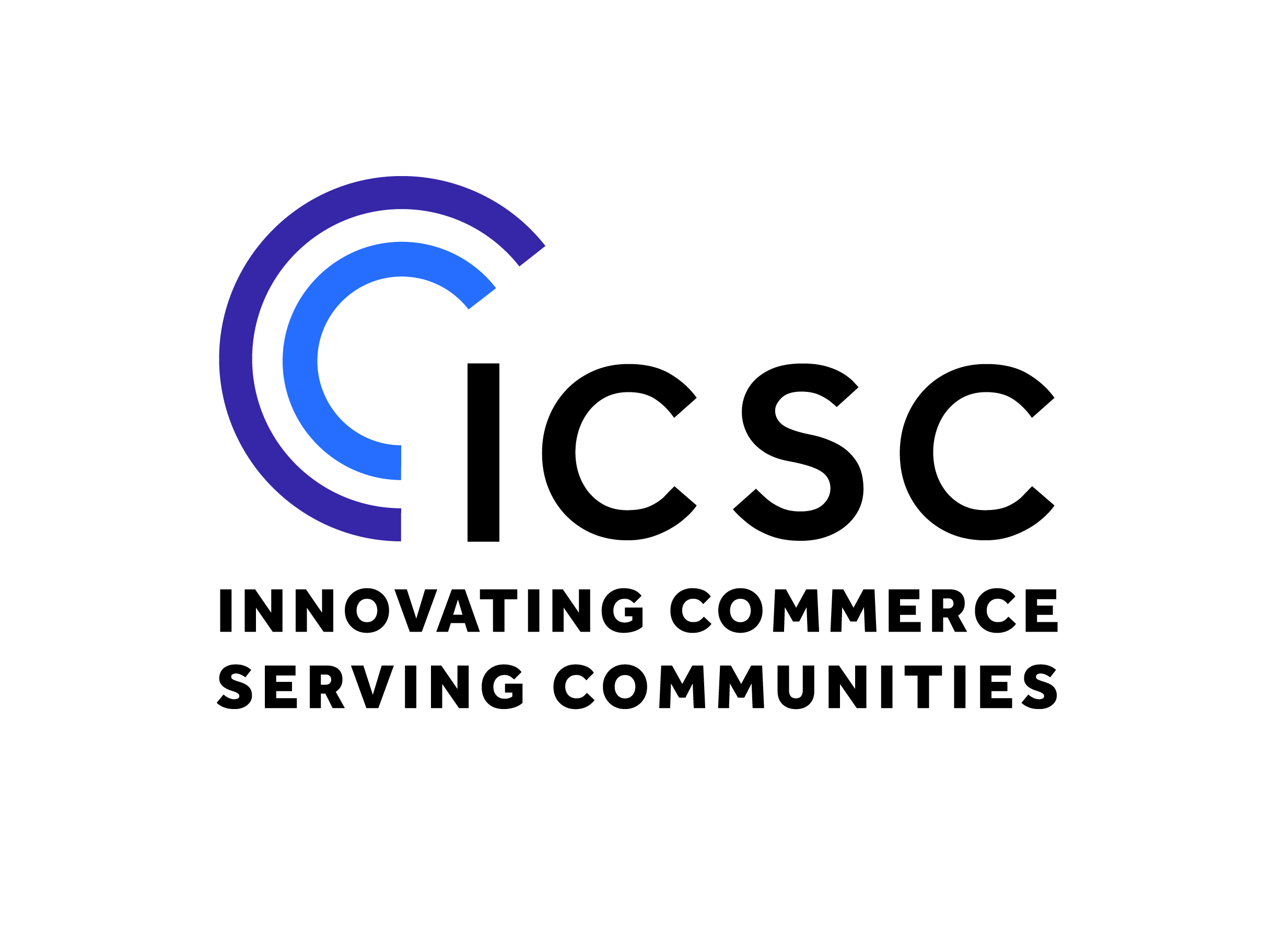
- ICSC | Innovating Commerce Serving Communities
- Abbreviation: ICSC
- Formation: 1957
- Type: Trade Association
- Headquarters: 1251 Avenue of the Americas; New York, NY 10020; U.S.
- Website: www.icsc.com

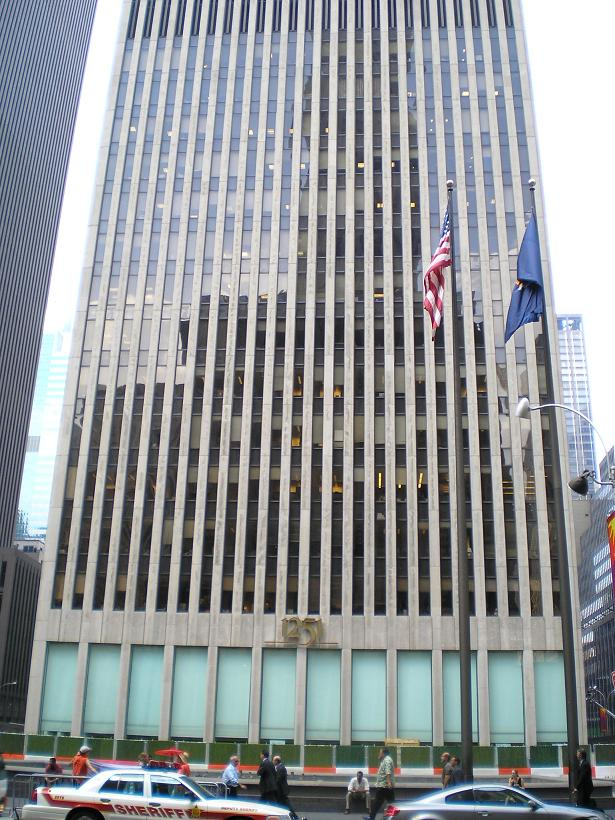
Headquarters of ICSC at 1251 Avenue of the Americas (north skyscraper) in Midtown Manhattan, New York City, United States.

The International Council of Shopping Centers, doing business as ICSC, is the global trade association of what it calls the "Marketplaces Industry" (i.e., shopping centers, shopping malls, and all other retail real estate).

== History ==
Founded in 1957, ICSC has more than 70,000 members in over 100 countries, as of May 2026, including shopping center owners, developers, managers, marketing specialists, investors, retailers and brokers, as well as academics and public officials. As the global industry trade association, ICSC links with more than 25 national and regional shopping center councils throughout the world.

In July 2021, ICSC rebranded itself in terms of its initials alone, and adopted the tagline "Innovating Commerce Serving Communities".

In September 2015, ICSC announced that Tom McGee, former vice chairman at Deloitte LLP, the world’s largest professional services organization, would serve as its new president and CEO. McGee was only the fourth person to head ICSC in its 65-year history. He succeeded retired President and CEO Michael P. Kercheval.

The International Council of Shopping Centers (ICSC) hosts events throughout the year, for professionals in the retail real estate industry. These events range from large-scale conferences like ICSC Las Vegas and ICSC New York.

== Worldwide relationships ==
ICSC maintains mutually beneficial relationships with national shopping center councils throughout the world. The national and regional councils are:

- Argentine Chamber of Shopping Centers (CASC)
- Colombian Shopping Centers Association (ACECOLOMBIA)
- Asociacion de Centros Comerciales de Medellin (ASOCENTROS)
- Shopping Centre Council of Australia
- Austrian Council of Shopping Centers
- Belgian Luxembourg Council of Shopping Centers
- Brazilian Shopping Centers Association (ABRASCE)
- Chilean Chamber of Shopping Centers (CChCC)
- Dutch Council of Shopping Centers
- French Council of Shopping Centers (CNCC)
- German Council of Shopping Centers e.V.
- Hungarian Council of Shopping Centers
- Italian Council of Shopping Centers
- Japan Council of Shopping Centers
- Middle East Council of Shopping Centres
- Mall China Information Center
- New Zealand Council of Shopping Centres
- Nordic Council of Shopping Centers
- Peruvian Shopping and Entertainment Centers Association (ACCEP)
- Polish Council of Shopping Centers
- Portuguese Association of Shopping Centres
- Revo (formerly British Council of Shopping Centres or BCSC)
- Russian Council of Shopping Centres (cancelled)
- South African Council of Shopping Centres
- Spanish Association of Shopping Centers (AECC)
- Swiss Council of Shopping Centers (SCSC)
- Taiwan Council of Shopping Centers
- Turkish Federation of Shopping Centers & Retailers (TAMPF)
- Venezuelan Chamber of Shopping Centers (CAVECECO)

== Classification of shopping centers ==
The ICSC publishes a standardized classification of shopping centers based on size and characteristics: see Shopping center#Types.
