= Brown Center for Students of Color =

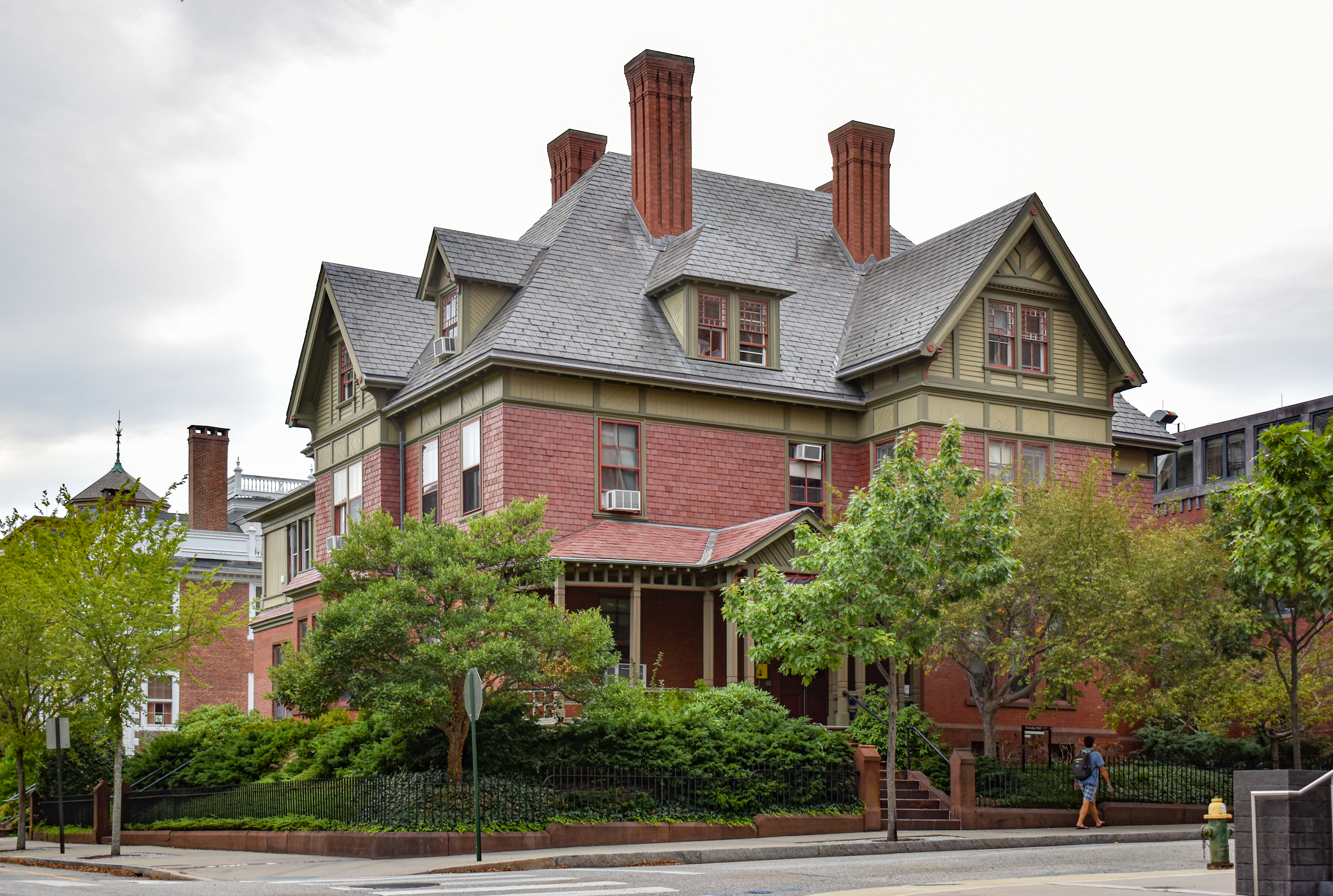
- Partridge Hall Entrance
- Formation: 1976
- Headquarters: Partridge Hall
- Location(s): 68 Brown St. Providence, RI
- Associate Dean and Director: Dr. Vincent T. Harris
- Affiliations: Brown University
- Website: https://www.brown.edu/campus-life/support/students-of-color/
- Formerly called: Third World Center

The Brown Center for Students of Color (BCSC), formerly known as the Third World Center, is a center for the support of students of color at Brown University. Founded in 1972 at Brown University in Providence, Rhode Island, the Center is "a place and space for students of color to explore their identity, develop their leadership skills, and build a sense of community in a welcoming and supportive environment." The BCSC was founded out of a rich history of student activism and organizing, a history that is honored in its mission today.

The center is staffed by administrators and student leaders and puts on a variety of workshops and events to spark dialogue and promote critical reflection and social justice around topics such as racism, classism, sexism, cissexism, heterosexism, imperialism, and ableism. Students can engage with the center as participants in the Third World Transition Program as well as apply to be Minority Peer Counselors, Heritage Series programmers, Initiative Coordinators, Student Advisory Board Members, and Office Aides. The BCSC is also open as a study and hang out space to students, with a variety of lounges and classrooms as well as Black, Latino, Asian American, Native, and Multiracial rooms that can be reserved for student group meetings.

The center was renamed from being the Third World Center in the fall of 2014, and is in the process of developing a Social Justice Peer Educators Program.

== History ==
The Brown Center for Students of Color was established after a series of student protests in 1968 and 1975. Amid the civil rights movement of the late 1960s and 1970s, a group of Black students walked out of Brown University in December 1968 in protest of fierce racism on campus. The students were led by a group of Black women at the then separate women's college at Brown, Pembroke College. Sixty-five of what were only eighty-five Black students at the time walked out together and marched to the nearby Congdon Street Baptist Church. The students had a list of demands for then President of the university, Ray Heffner. These included increasing the university's enrollment of freshmen to 11%, which was granted alongside financial aid for those students and an increase in Black faculty and staff. As a result of the 1968 demands, the eight-week-long academic and social enrichment focused Transitional Summer Program was created, later to be shortened and become the Third World Transitional Program in 1975. The demands also led to the initial creation of the Rites and Reasons Theater in 1970, one of the oldest continuously running Black theaters in the country. A series of protests in 1972 by Third World Students pushed the university to recommit to the 1968 demands, which was one of the factors that led to the creation of the Minority Peer Counselor Program in 1973.

The second set of protests in 1975 against the new administration headed by President Donald Frederick Hornig was in response to the proposed 1975-1976 budget. The budget was set to reduce financial aid and reduce faculty in a way that would affect minorities. Students formed a Third World Coalition and took over University Hall. Forty Black, Asian, and Latino students occupied University Hall for 38 and a half hours in an effort to again assert a recommitment to the 1968 demands. This led to the renaming of the Transitional Summer Program to the Third World Transition Program as well as the establishment of the Third World Center in the basement of Churchill House. The Third World Center was actually established because the Afro House at 227 Bowen was going to be destroyed to create a new dormitory complex, so Churchill basement was proposed as the new quarters. The decision was made, however, to have the Third World Center cater to all Third World students, Black, Latino, Asian, and Native.

In 1985, the Third World Coalition again occupied a university building, this time John Carter Brown Library, in an effort to increase minority representation in the student body and to reclaim documents of Brown's slaveholding family, among other demands. In 1987, the Third World Center moved to its current location, Partridge Hall, as a result of the 1985 demands.

In 1992, there was another takeover of University Hall and a push for continued commitment to the demands of the 1968, 1975, and 1985 protests.

A strategic plan that ended in the fall of 2014 was charged with developing a revised mission statement for the center, developing a five-year plan that outlined goals of critical reflection and informed action, leadership development, and social justice education for students of color and their allies, and renaming the center in a way that still reflecting the legacy of student of color activism. It is under this charge that the Third World Center was renamed to be the Brown Center for Students of Color.

== Mission ==
The mission of the Brown Center for Students of Color has evolved over the years, but its current mission statement reads "Visualize. Vocalize. Mobilize." it continues to serve as a gathering place for students of color and makes an effort to "build meaningful relationships across difference, develop racial and ethnic consciousness, and enact change at Brown and beyond. The BCSC advances Brown University’s mission of educating and preparing students to discharge the offices of life with usefulness and reputation by empowering students of color, cultivating leadership, facilitating critical reflection, fostering informed action, and promoting social justice."

== Center Initiatives ==
=== Third World Transition Program ===
The Third World Transition Program (TWTP) was established in 1969 as the Transitional Summer Program as part of the demands of the 1968 student walk outs. It originally consisted of 7 weeks of academic enrichment followed by one week of socializing and other activities. Currently, TWTP consists of 3 days of workshops about various systems of oppression such as racism, classism, sexism, heterosexism, and cissexism. The workshops are held as a pre-orientation program for students about to enter their first year of college that introduces students to a variety of support structures and resources on Brown's campus. It calls on participants to be open to new perspectives and reconsider history and aspects of their identity to both understand themselves and the community they have become a part of. The name refers again, to Third World-ism rather than to any set of so-called Third World countries.

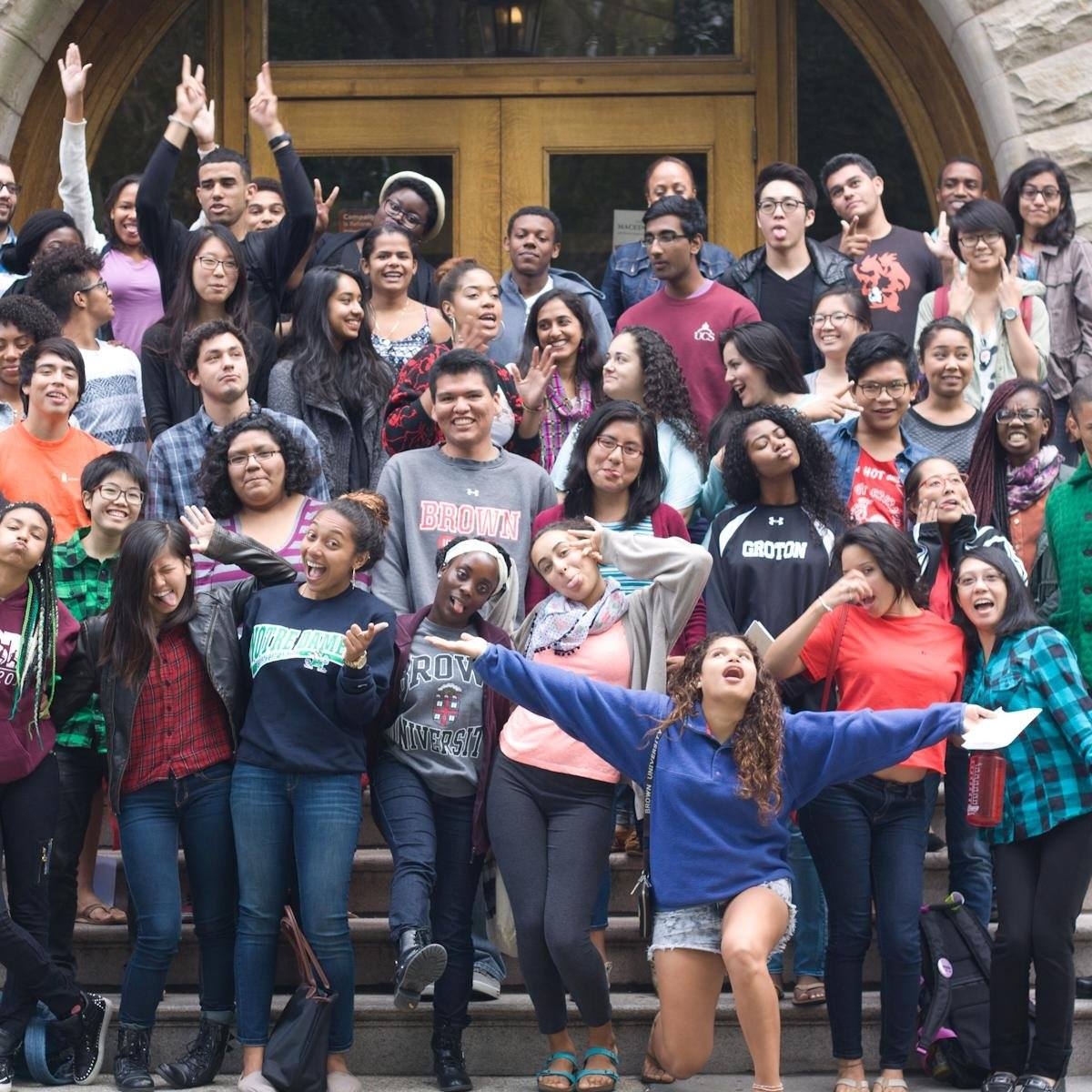
BCSC Staff 2014-2015

==== Controversy ====
Due to the topics of conversation discussed and to the unfamiliarity people may have with the history of the name, TWTP has been the recipient of much controversy. In 2002, the program was first opened to white students if they wished to participate. In 2006, only nine white students total had participated in the program. Since then white student attendance has increased, which has led to concerns about the threat to the original intentions of the program being a space specifically geared towards students of color. Many students have also exhibited mixed reviews on the program's intentions and successes, from extreme success and community building to the exact opposite. To that point, critical students have expressed that the timing of the program before other orientation activities separates the larger student body from TWTP participants, and press for a larger campus conversation incorporating all incoming freshmen.

=== Minority Peer Counselor Program ===
The Minority Peer Counselor Program was created in 1973 by Black upperclassmen at Brown to help Black underclassmen with their academic pursuits. Counselors act as a source of support and foster community. In the mid 70's, the program expanded to include those of Asian and Latino backgrounds. In the 80's, the program expanded to include Native and Multiracial students. In 1995, Arab Americans were also added to the possible applicant list. Minority Peer Counselors are often referred to in shorthand as MPCs.

In the 90's, MPCs began to offer workshops on Racism, Classism, Sexism, and Heterosexism and Homophobia in order to spark discussions and critical dialogue throughout campus. Hosted throughout the year, workshops often expand beyond the four outlined topics, addressing issues such as Cissexism, Imperialism, Ableism, Religious discrimination, and Ageism. The broader topics are often broken down into specific intersections of identity such as food access for different races and classes, Sexual Assault and Violence perpetuated towards communities of color, or Post-9/11 Islamophobia, as examples. Moreover, MPCs live in first year units at Brown, serving as resources and mentors to all students, drawing on their experiences as students of color.

=== ALANA Mentoring Program ===
ALANA is a mentoring program founded in 1994 through the university. ALANA stands for the intended mentees of the program, African American, Latino, Asian/Asian American, and native students. It pairs students of color with staff, graduate/medical students, or alumni of color to foster meaningful interaction and provide support and guidance to incoming students. The program begins a freshman's second semester and continues into the first semester of their sophomore year. Though mentors and mentees are in constant dialogue, the program also hosts events throughout the year to let mentors and mentees share ideas and connect with one another.

=== Heritage Series ===
The BCSC sponsors 5 distinct heritage series. They are the Black Heritage Series, the Latino Heritage Series, the Asian/Asian American Heritage Series, the Native American Heritage Series, and the Multiracial Heritage Series. The series are responsible for putting on student events and bringing distinguished speakers and performers to campus that reflect and celebrate the identities of their respective series.

=== Student Initiatives ===
The BCSC also serves as a meeting place of student-led groups labelled as student initiatives that foster community between small groups that fall into broader categorizations, build leadership skills, or connect students directly to alumni. These include the Black Student Initiative, which maintains a close relationship with the Inman Page Black Alumni Council. The BCSC also houses BlackBoard and ONYX, a group that celebrates the graduation of Black students from Brown into being black alumni. The Latino Student Initiative and the Asian American Student Initiative work closely with Latino Alumni and the Asian/Asian American Alumni Alliance (A4), respectively. The BCSC also houses Latino Leadership Gatherings and the Pan Asian Council.

== Renaming ==
The Brown Center for Students of Color was renamed from its original name of the Third World Center in fall of 2014. Thirty potential names were discussed and voted on by involved faculty, staff, and students. The name change was a result of a year long internal review that involved a reshaping of both the BCSC's mission, organizational structure, resources, and programs. These include the replacement of the Minority Peer counselor Friends program with the currently developing Social Justice Peer Educator program. The internal review also led to the publishing of a strategic plan that outlined many of the center's priorities for the next five years.
