= Maya Dusenbery =

American journalist and author

Maya Dusenbery is an American journalist and author. She is the executive editor for editorial at feminist blog Feministing and the author of the book Doing Harm: The Truth About How Bad Medicine and Lazy Science Leave Women Dismissed, Misdiagnosed, and Sick.

== Career ==
Dusenbery has said that she became motivated to become involved with feminist movements as a teenager when she read about abstinence-only education: "I clearly remember in high school reading about the Bush administration restricting funding for HIV prevention to groups that were abstinence-only and I remember thinking that was the most absurd thing I ever heard, almost criminally ridiculous."

Dusenbery began her career working as a communications assistant at NARAL Pro-Choice New York and the National Institute for Reproductive Health. Since 2009, she has reported on issues of reproductive health, including abortion stigma, rape culture, and masculinity, for Bitch Media, The Atlantic, Cosmopolitan, the Huffington Post, and Mother Jones (where she was a fellow in 2012) and Pacific Standard, where she is a columnist. In 2013, she became the editorial director of feminist media outlet Feministing. Dusenbery wrote a chapter for the Feminist Press anthology The Feminist Utopia Project imagining a future without rape.

In March 2018, HarperCollins published Dusenbery's book Doing Harm: The Truth About How Bad Medicine and Lazy Science Leave Women Dismissed, Misdiagnosed, and Sick, an analysis of gender bias in modern medical treatment in the United States. Dusenbery's personal experience motivated her to write the book: She was diagnosed with rheumatoid arthritis at the age of 27 and was surprised to learn that 50 million Americans suffer from autoimmune diseases, the majority of them women. Publishers Weekly gave the book a starred review, saying it "skillfully interweaves history, medical studies, current literature, and hard data to produce damning evidence that women wait longer for diagnoses, receive inadequate pain management, and are often told they are imagining symptoms that are taken seriously in men." The book also received a positive review from Kirkus Reviews, which described it as a "sturdy account of how sexism in medicine is hobbling women’s health care." Doing Harm was highlighted as a recommended read by Popular Science, Harpers Bazaar, and Bitch Media.

== Personal life ==
Dusenbery is a native of Minnesota and received a B.A. from Carleton College in 2008. She now lives in the Twin Cities.
