= The Purity Myth =

2009 book by Jessica Valenti

The Purity Myth: How America's Obsession with Virginity Is Hurting Young Women
- Author: Jessica Valenti
- Language: English
- Subjects: Virginity; Feminism
- Published: March 24, 2009
- Publisher: Seal Press
- Publication place: United States
- Media type: Print
- Pages: 272
- ISBN: 1-58005-253-3
- Preceded by: He's a Stud, She's a Slut
- Followed by: Why Have Kids?

The Purity Myth: How America's Obsession with Virginity Is Hurting Young Women (2009) is a book about virginity by feminist author Jessica Valenti. The book was first released onto hardback on March 24, 2009, through Seal Press. Valenti argues that there is a prevalent false notion promoted within the United States that a woman's worth is predicated upon whether or not she is sexually active, implying that the loss of virginity can negatively affect her. A DVD tie-in titled The Purity Myth: The Virginity Movement's War Against Women was released in 2011.

== Summary ==
In the book, Valenti discusses a variety of societal elements that promote chastity and discourage pre-marital sexual activity in women and teenage girls. She states that many sex education programs in the United States only promote abstinence-only education, which she feels gives an unhealthy attitude towards sex and women. Valenti also states that the myth uses virginity as an "easy ethical road map" to teach women that, unlike the ability to abstain from having sex, their beliefs and actions hold no bearing to their value as human beings. Valenti does not discourage chastity but shows disapproval over virginity pledge programs such as purity balls and the Silver Ring Thing for the aforementioned reasons.

Valenti also argues that over-emphasis on and idealization of virginity promotes the Madonna–whore complex, which makes many women and teen girls hypersexualized and unable to live up to the expectations placed upon them. Valenti also states that she believes that the concept of virginity is a myth, as the actual definition of the term is abstract and differs depending on the person, religion, or situation. Valenti explains that she was unable to find an exact medical definition of virginity in the Harvard Medical School library and that the popular concept of virginity does not fit both genders.

== In other media ==
Commentators have linked Valenti's views on virginity to discussions of sexual assault victims and the rape and pregnancy statement controversies in the 2012 United States elections.
