= Yes Means Yes =

2008 book by Jaclyn Friedman and Jessica Valenti

Yes Means Yes: Visions of Female Sexual Power and a World Without Rape
- Editors: Jaclyn Friedman and Jessica Valenti
- Language: English
- Subject: Feminism
- Publisher: Perseus Books Group
- Publication date: December 1, 2008
- Publication place: United States
- Media type: Print
- Pages: 351
- ISBN: 978-1-58005-257-3
- OCLC: 227574524
- Preceded by: He's a Stud, She's a Slut
- Followed by: The Purity Myth

Yes Means Yes: Visions of Female Sexual Power and a World Without Rape is a feminist non-fiction book edited by Jaclyn Friedman and Jessica Valenti, published in 2008. The book was one of Publishers Weekly's 99 Best Books of 2009 and inspired a sexual education non-credit course at Colgate University. The title refers to the popular, "Yes Means Yes" affirmative consent campaign against date rape, which calls for male sexual participants to obtain a declaration of consent, "yes", to each sexual act or escalation.

Contributors to the anthology include: Rachel Kramer Bussel, Hanne Blank, Margaret Cho, Heather Corinna, Stacey May Fowles, Coco Fusco, Lisa Jervis, Leah Lakshmi Piepzna-Samarasinha, and Julia Serano. The book consists of a series of essays by various authors, which share the central theme of preventing rape by addressing the sociocultural milieu that the authors argue is complicit in enabling sexual harassment, sexual assault, and rape. Sexual consent, body image, self-esteem, and sexual violence are discussed throughout the essays.

== Yes Means Yes law ==
In 2014, California Governor Jerry Brown signed into law the "Yes Means Yes" bill, which requires colleges in California to have clear sexual assault policies that shift the burden of proof from the victims to the accused. The "Yes Means Yes" movement stems out of the "No Means No" movement that was created in the 1990s by the Canadian Federation of Students in order to combat sexual violence.

The original movement focused on the idea that when two people are engaging in sexual intimacy, if the word "no" is not present then their sexual acts are consensual. This belief led to ambiguity in court cases that pertained to sexual assault allegations. With the "Yes Means Yes" law in place, affirmative consent is now defined as, "an affirmative, unambiguous, and conscious decision by each participant to engage in mutually agreed-upon sexual activity." This law is to be enforced on college campuses throughout California, and clearly outlines that consent is received through a verbal or physical "yes".

== Levy's critique ==
Andrea Levy argues that the book does not challenge readers to take action against the complex issues that arise when facing "the oppressive mainstream of North American progressive political culture." Levy continues by explaining that works like Friedman and Valenti's are accompanied by a "liberal-democratic" understanding of how the world works, but it hinders the ability to be able to see how things happen socially. Further, Levy states that the struggles against colonization and white supremacy are seen as peripheral, which could lead to discrimination against marginalized communities.

== Other topics ==
Other topics included in the book are body image, self-esteem issues, incest, and the societal views on rape.
