= Dead Blondes and Bad Mothers =

2019 non-fiction book

- Front cover
- Author: Jude Ellison Doyle (Note: The author was credited as Sady Doyle.)
- Subject: Horror fiction and feminism
- Publisher: Melville House
- Publication date: August 13, 2019
- Pages: 352
- ISBN: 978-1-61219-792-0
- OCLC: 1104214645

Dead Blondes and Bad Mothers: Monstrosity, Patriarchy and the Fear of Female Power is a 2019 book by Jude Ellison Doyle. It explores the presentation of female bodies in literature, film and other media, particularly horror fiction and true crime, and proposes that these are reflective of patriarchal views: that a woman's body is a defect from a male body; that women should be controlled, and that their puberty or sexual autonomy are to be feared; and that men's criminality can be attributed to poor maternal influence. Case studies include The Exorcist's portrayal of female puberty, the murderer Ed Gein who inspired Psycho and the Frankenstein author Mary Shelley's real-life experiences relating to childbirth. The conclusion discusses witchcraft.

It was Doyle's second book, after Trainwreck (2016), and has a more pessimistic outlook on the future of women's rights. Critics praised the writing quality, humor and style of argumentation, finding its conclusions mostly agreeable.

== Background ==
Jude Ellison Doyle's first book, Trainwreck: The Women We Love to Hate, Mock, and Fear... and Why (2016), analyzed the social consequences facing women who violated gender roles in various cultures, and women's mental health. Their second book, Dead Blondes and Bad Mothers, was published by Melville House on August 13, 2019. Doyle is non-binary but identified as a woman and used the name "Sady Doyle" at the time of writing.

While writing the book proposal for Dead Blondes and Bad Mothers, media personality Donald Trump won the 2016 United States presidential election—this and other events led Doyle to change their perspective from Trainwreck, where they had thought women's rights were advancing, to be more pessimistic and contain more hopelessness. Doyle wished to present the issues women face as structural—arising from patriarchy—rather than isolated or disconnected. They were recently married and pregnant and wanted to write about the stigmatization of female bodies. The first draft of the book consisted entirely of movie reviews.

== Synopsis ==
The book uses analysis of horror fiction to explore the cultural idea that a woman's body is lesser or a deformed version of a man's body. Doyle quotes Aristotle and Thomas Aquinas, two individuals who held this view of women. The book explores literature, film, mythology, religion and history, as well as current affairs. It is categorized into sections about daughters, wives and mothers.

In the section about daughters, Doyle writes about poltergeists and demonic possessions as allegory for female puberty. They make particular reference to The Exorcist (1973), a film about a 12-year-old girl who is possessed—she is depicted masturbating and bleeding, with her body changing. Doyle argues that society is particularly interested in young girls being possessed as symbolism for their growing autonomy and the inability of men to control them. The film led to a resurgence of religious exorcisms being performed on adolescent women. In Carrie (1976), the film adaptation of Stephen King's debut novel of the same name (1974), the title character is a young girl who has begun menstruating; she is controlled by an abusive mother with a negative conception of women's bodies.

Women are the primary audience for true crime stories and horror fiction; Doyle states that they are attracted to the genres as a way of processing and speaking about the systemic violence they face. Narratives about serial killers can relate to sexual violence, and slasher film endings wherein a woman kills the murderer can be emotionally appealing.

On the topic of wives, Doyle discusses women as "seductresses", through mythological creatures such as fairies and Sirens. This includes discussion of how Bridget Cleary was killed by her husband, who insisted she was a fairy. Doyle argues that these narratives arise from male anxiety of women's sexual autonomy. Transgender women are portrayed as deceptive seducers, which justifies male violence against them—the trans panic defense. The rest of the section is about marriage. In Gone Girl (2012), the highly educated protagonist Amy experiences frustration at being restricted to being a housewife for the immature and unfaithful Nick.

Doyle recounts the life of Mary Shelley, best known as the author of Frankenstein (1818). Shelley was the daughter of Mary Wollstonecraft, who died of complications giving birth to her. She became pregnant as a teenager, but the baby was born prematurely and died; she later had two surviving children. Her father William Godwin made it publicly known that her half-sister Fanny Imlay was illegitimate, and Imlay later killed herself. Doyle views Frankenstein as a narrative about the fear a woman experiences in bringing a new person into the world without knowing who they will turn out to be, particularly given Shelley's relation to disastrous childbirths.

The mother of murderer Ed Gein, the inspiration for the films Psycho (1960) and The Silence of the Lambs (1991), is often held accountable for his psyche. She is portrayed as overly religious, moralistic, angry and obsessive over her son. However, Gein's father was physically abusive towards both him and his mother, and Doyle argues that Gein's mother was Gein's only emotional support in a misogynistic society. He had schizophrenia and began his murders after his mother's death. The Psycho serial killer, Norman Bates, is coded as queer or transgender; this originates from the Freudian idea that queerness is a product of a missing father figure in childhood.

In a conclusion, "The Woman at the Edge of the Woods", Doyle talks about contemporary American culture, such as Modern Pagan opposition to the presidency of Donald Trump and the power held by other men accused of sexual assault. They talk about the witch as a woman who has rejected the patriarchy of her society and holds a form of forbidden power. Doyle also refers to the historical persecution of midwives and powerful women as witches.

== Reception ==
Jenny Rogers of The Washington Post criticized many of Doyle's arguments as tenuous, negatively reviewing the minimal focus on contemporary media and the overuse of poetry analysis. However, Rogers enjoyed the feminist analysis of Jurassic Park and the suggestions of why true crime appeals to women and found the writing style witty and convincing. Similarly, in Frames Cinema Journal, Srishti Walia wrote that the book presents its arguments with "rigorous resoluteness", but fails to engage in nuance, attributing all negative actions by women to misogyny as the root cause. Walia praised the humor and prose quality, saying that the book's analysis was "long overdue".

Shannon Carlin rated it four out of five stars for Bust, praising the humor and summarizing that Doyle "writes as if ... ready to lead a revolution for women who are tired of being underestimated and mistreated". PopMatters listed the book as one of several dozen recommendations for non-fiction of 2019, with staff member Megan Volpert praising the writing style as amusing and free from jargon. Mallory O'Meara at Tor.com recommended it for horror fans, describing it as "brilliant as it is frightening" and approving of Doyle's societal analysis. Sarah Beth Gilbert of Femspec praised the structure of the book and Doyle's argument, saying that it made a "compelling case for the power that feminist theory has when applied to pop culture and history".

Reviewing for Library Journal, Emily Bowles recommended it for university courses in the subjects of feminism, gender studies and media studies, as well as for laypeople. Bowles praised that Doyle transitions "seamlessly from feminist theory and pop culture analysis to damning real-life examples of the dangers women face" and called the book a "vital read on femininity and sexuality". The Rumpus's Kim Liao lauded the book's research and the "fine balance" in the writing between anger and analysis. Liao highlighted the section on Frankenstein as a "powerful mix of historical research, literary analysis, and gender criticism". A writer for Kirkus Reviews also praised the writing style, particularly the "chilling" account of Anneliese Michel's death. They summarized the book as "unflinching, hard-charging feminist criticism". Booklist's Annie Bostrom commented that "teen patriarchy-crushers will likely appreciate Doyle's superinformed, no-nonsense, and even sometimes funny take on female monstrosity", praising the humor and the documentation of sources.
