= Sesali Bowen =

American author

Sesali Bowen is an American author and feminist known for being the founder of trap feminism.

She is known for her book, Bad Fat Black Girl: Notes From a Trap Feminist. Her work defines trap feminism which discusses how black female and queer people express themselves and protect themselves, especially through rapping and trap music, which has historically had problems with misogyny. Trap feminism attempts to explain contradictions of "how people attempt to celebrate Black women without talking about their lived experiences" and creates new ways for underrepresented people to self-express. Bowen has described trap feminism as a "messy feminism" and often includes messages of body-acceptance and sexual liberation in her works. Bowen also helps run the Purse First podcast, which is considered the first platform specifically for female and queer hip-hop artists.

She has criticized misappropriation of the term trap feminism, especially when a white professor of theology attempted to publish her own book on the topic.

Bowen identifies as queer.

== Education ==
Bowen has a Masters in Gender Studies from Georgia State University. She has worked previously at Planned Parenthood and Oxygen.

== Select publications ==
- Bowen, Sesali (13 September 2022). Bad Fat Black Girl: Notes from a Trap Feminist. HarperCollins. ISBN 9780063111745.
