= Sex Object =

2016 book by Jessica Valenti

Sex Object: A Memoir
- Author: Jessica Valenti
- Language: English
- Subject: Sexism, gender, sexuality
- Publisher: Dey Street
- Publication date: June 1, 2016
- Publication place: United States
- Pages: 224
- ISBN: 978-0-06-243508-8

Sex Object: A Memoir is a 2016 memoir and the sixth book written by Jessica Valenti. Valenti shares personal stories recounting her childhood and adolescence regarding her treatment as a sex object and the pernicious influence of sexism in her daily encounters. She paints an image of an adult whose identity has been shaped by these experiences. Valenti argues that most women face a similar reality of being shaped by—and making everyday decisions to minimize—male aggressions and sexual assault. Valenti was able to use Sex Object: A Memoir as a platform to focus on sharing experiences with readers, helping them understand how prevalent sexism is for young girls and women, and shedding light on the sheer size of this cultural problem.

== Publication history ==
Valenti published Sex Object on June 1, 2016, with Dey Street.

Valenti selected the title despite fear of backlash, some of which came to fruition with the book's publication. Speaking to Emma Gray at HuffPost, Valenti said:

"People say, 'Oh you’re too ugly to call yourself a sex object' — as if calling yourself an object is a compliment, which completely misses the point. But I decided that I can’t let harassers determine the content of the book. At the end of the day, this is a book about objectification and dehumanization. So that was the most accurate term."

== Summary ==
The 224-page book is divided in 21 chapters chronicling Valenti's encounters with street harassment and other forms of sexual assault, sexism, and poor treatment from sexual partners. Valenti promotes the idea that men can start mitigating women's daily experience of sexism by listening to women and believing their experiences.

== Reception ==
Reviewing the book in The New Republic, Rafia Zakaria described the book's strength in Valenti's reappraisal of her own experience with objectification, including her prior blindness to the phenomenon; Zakaria compared Valenti's critical reassessment of her own experiences to Adrienne Rich's observation that for women "'revision—the act of looking back, of seeing with fresh eyes, of entering an old text from a new critical direction is more than an act of cultural history; It is an act of survival.' Sex Object is such an act of revision."
