= Julia Serano =

American writer and activist (born 1967)

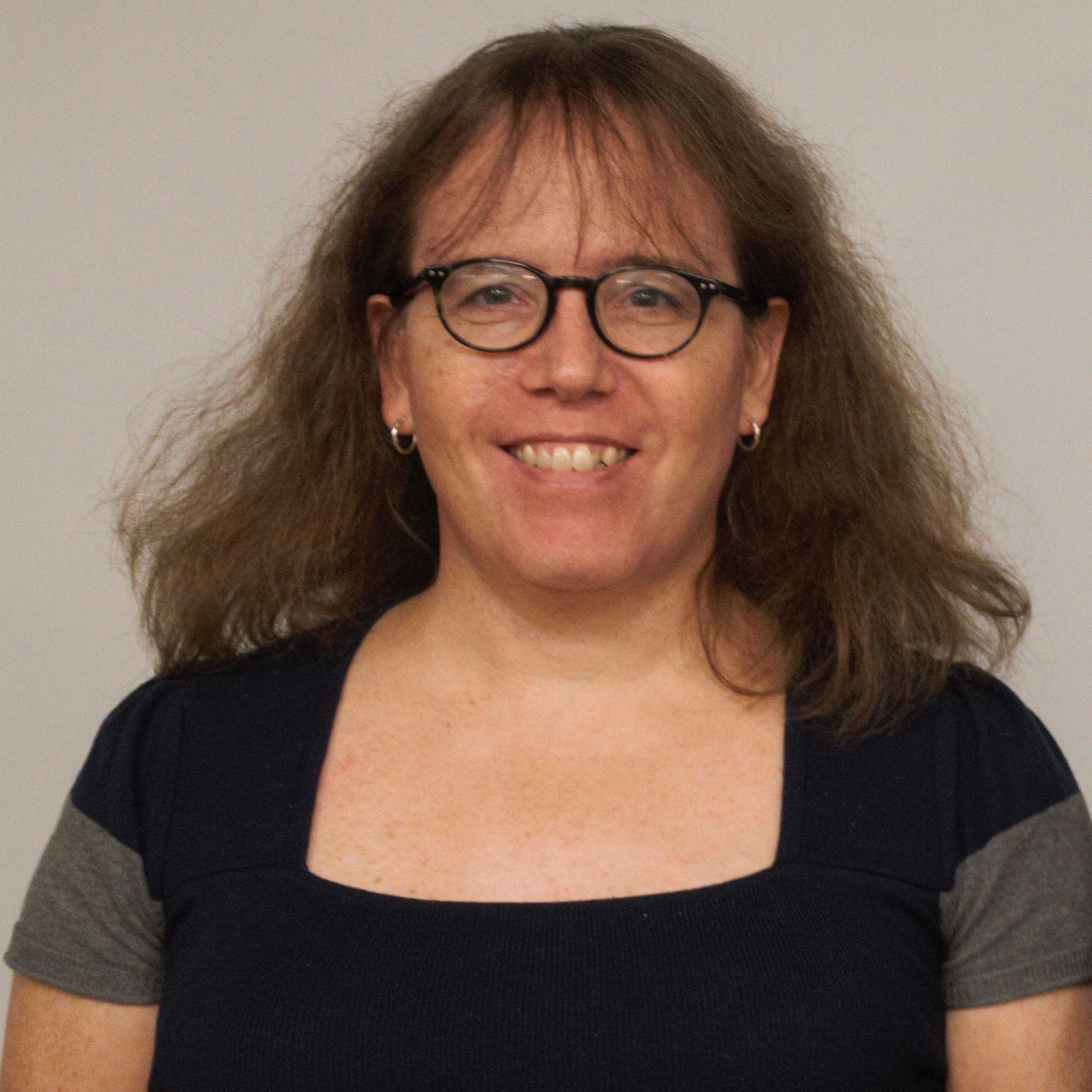
- Serano in 2018
- Born: 1967 (age 58–59)
- Education: Philadelphia University; Columbia University (PhD, 1995)
- Employer: UC Berkeley (2003–2012)
- Known for: Trans and bi activism, coining the terms "subconscious sex" and "transmisogyny", criticism of Blanchard's transsexualism typology, writing, spoken word performance
- Notable work: Whipping Girl, Excluded, Outspoken
- Website: www.juliaserano.com

Julia Michelle Serano (/səˈrænoʊ/ sə-RAN-o; born 1967) is an American writer, musician, spoken-word performer, transgender and bisexual activist, and biologist. She is known for her transfeminist books, such as Whipping Girl (2007), Excluded (2013), and Outspoken (2016). She is also a public speaker who has given many talks at universities and conferences. Her writing is frequently featured in queer, feminist, and popular culture magazines.

== Life ==
Serano has stated that she first consciously recognized in herself a desire to be female during the late 1970s, when she was 11 years old. A few years later, she began gender-bending. At first, she gender-bent secretively, but she eventually started identifying herself openly as a "male crossdresser." Serano attended her first support group for gender-bending communities in 1994 while she lived in Kansas.

Soon afterward, Serano moved to the San Francisco Bay Area where she met her wife, Dani, in 1998. During this time, Serano began identifying as not only a crossdresser but also transgender and bisexual. In 2001, she began medically transitioning and identifying as a transgender woman.

== Career ==
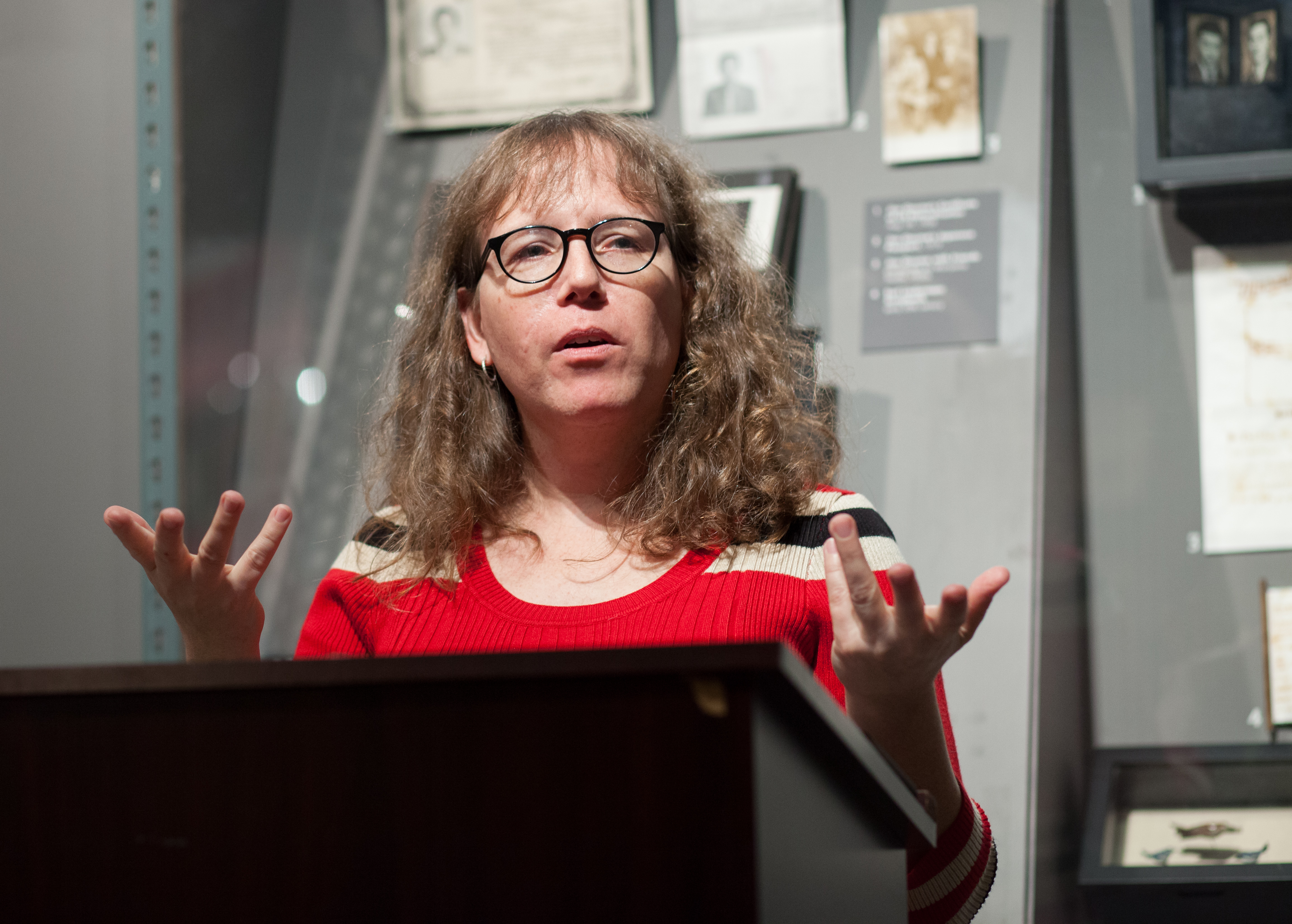
Julia Serano speaks at the GLBT History Museum in San Francisco for the launch of the second edition of Whipping Girl.

Serano earned her PhD in biochemistry and molecular biophysics from Columbia University. She researched genetics, developmental biology, and evolutionary biology at the University of California, Berkeley for 17 years.

Serano is the author of Whipping Girl: A Transsexual Woman on Sexism and the Scapegoating of Femininity. Her second book, Excluded: Making Feminist and Queer Movements More Inclusive, was published on September 10, 2013, by Seal Press. It was named the 16th best nonfiction book of all time by readers of Ms. Magazine. Her third book, Outspoken: A Decade of Transgender Activism and Trans Feminism, she published herself under Switch Hitter Press, which she founded along with Switch Hitter Records. Outspoken is a 2017 Lambda Literary Award finalist. Her 2020 book, 99 Erics: a Kat Cataclysm faux novel, also published by Switch Hitter, won the Publishing Triangle's 2021 Edmund White Award for Debut Fiction and was an Independent Publisher Book Awards 2021 silver medalist in LGBT+ Fiction.

Her work has appeared in queer, feminist, and pop culture magazines, including Bitch, Clamor, Kitchen Sink, LiP, make/shift, and Transgender Tapestry. Excerpts of her work have appeared in The Believer and The San Francisco Chronicle and on NPR.

Serano has spoken about transgender and trans women's issues at numerous universities, often at queer, feminist, psychology, and philosophy-themed conferences. In 2023, she gave the keynote address at the Moving Trans History Forward conference at the University of Victoria. Her writings have also been used in teaching materials in gender studies courses across the United States.

Serano is a slam poet and has given spoken-word performances at universities as well as at events such as the National Queer Arts Festival, San Francisco Pride Dyke March and Trans March stages, Ladyfest, outCRY!, Femme 2006 and in The Vagina Monologues. She was a guitarist and vocalist for the band Bitesize from 1997 through the early 2000s and has also recorded solo music.

Serano organizes and hosts GenderEnders, a performance series that features the work of transgender, intersex, and genderqueer artists and allies that has produced 20 shows. She received a grant to curate "The Penis Issue: Trans and Intersex Women Speak Their Minds," a spoken-word event, as part of the 2007 National Queer Arts Festival.

She writes social justice articles on the website Medium about topics like transgender identity, LGBTQ+ visibility, and identity politics.

== Personal life ==
Serano lives in Oakland, California.

== Works ==
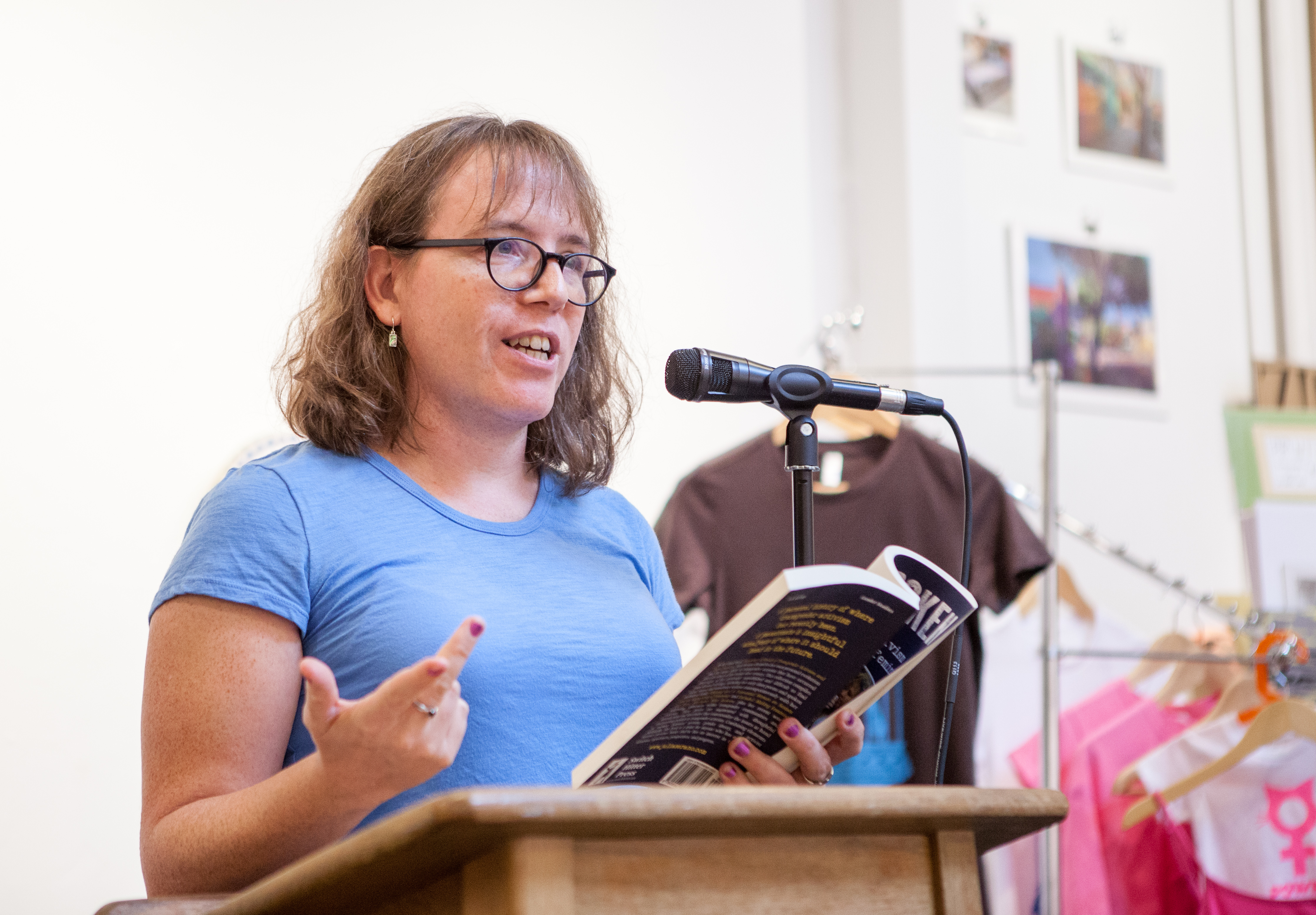
Serano reads from her book Outspoken in 2017

=== Books ===
- —— (2002). Either/Or. Switch Hitter Press.
- —— (2005). On the Outside Looking In... Oakland, California: Hot Tranny Action!. OCLC 163613642.
- —— (2007). Whipping Girl: A Transsexual Woman on Sexism and the Scapegoating of Femininity. Seal Press. ISBN 9781580051545.
- —— (2013). Excluded: Making Feminist and Queer Movements More Inclusive. Basic Books. ISBN 9781580055048.
- —— (2016). Outspoken: A Decade of Transgender Activism and Trans Feminism. Switch Hitter Press. ISBN 9780996881005.
- —— (2020). 99 Erics: A Kat Cataclysm Faux Novel. Switch Hitter Press. ISBN 9780996881043.
- —— (2022). Sexed Up: How Society Sexualizes Us, and How We Can Fight Back. Basic Books. ISBN 9781541674806.

=== Anthologies ===
- Friedman, Jaclyn; Valenti, Jessica, eds. (2008). "Why nice guys finish last". Yes Means Yes: Visions of Female Sexual Power and A World Without Rape. Berkeley, Calif.: Seal Press. pp. 227–240. ISBN 9781580052573. OCLC 227574524.
- Diamond, Morty, ed. (2011). "Cherry Picking". Trans/Love: Radical Sex, Love & Relationships Beyond the Gender Binary. San Francisco: Manic D Press. ISBN 9781933149561. OCLC 709681495.
