= He's a Stud, She's a Slut =

2008 book by Jessica Valenti

He's a Stud, She's a Slut, and 49 Other Double Standards Every Woman Should Know
- Author: Jessica Valenti
- Language: English
- Publisher: Seal Press
- Publication date: May 6, 2008
- Publication place: United States
- Pages: 224
- ISBN: 978-1580052450
- Preceded by: Full Frontal Feminism
- Followed by: Yes Means Yes

He's a Stud, She's a Slut, and 49 Other Double Standards Every Woman Should Know is a 2008 book by feminist writer Jessica Valenti. The 244-page work, commenting on 50 double-standards in expectations for women, is Valenti's second book.

== Reception ==
New York magazine's Vulture vertical said Valenti "delivers thoughtful observations on serious under-the-radar issues." Bustle named the book to a 2017 list of best books on mansplaining: "5 Books To Give The Men In Your Life So You Don't Have To Keep Explaining It."

In The New York Times, Liesl Schillinger compared Valenti's book to a work published the same year by conservative author Kathleen Parker, noting the two books mentioned a number of the same studies and cultural touchstones, just interpreted to opposite conclusions. Parker argues contemporary American culture disregards the needs of boys and men while Valenti—Schillinger suggests, more persuasively—argues deference to the "delicate male ego" is overprioritized against the welfare of women.
