= Gender taxonomy =

The gender taxonomy is a classification of the range of different levels at which humans vary in sexual characteristics. It is mainly used by medical specialists working in the area of sex research. John Money and Milton Diamond are probably the best known researchers in this field. Money earned his PhD for research into human hermaphroditism and pseudohermaphroditism, now known as intersex conditions. The taxonomy starts at the simplest, biological level and traces differentiations expressed at the increasingly complicated levels produced over the course of the human life cycle.
