= Jaclyn Friedman =

American writer and activist (born 1971)

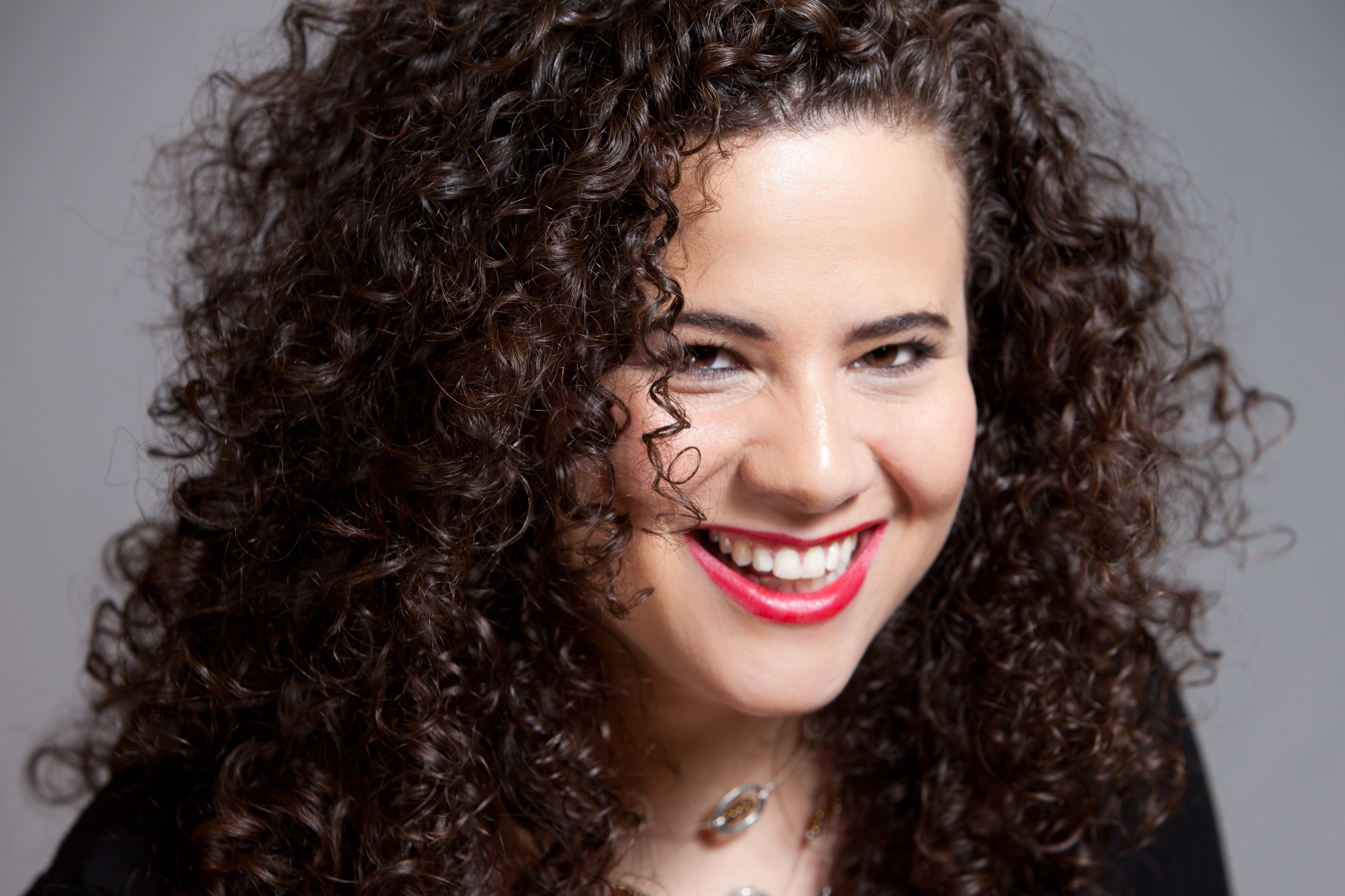
- Born: 1971 (age 54–55)
- Education: Wesleyan University; Emerson College (M.F.A.)
- Occupations: Executive Director, EducateUS: Changing Sex Ed for Good
- Known for: Editing Yes Means Yes: Visions of Female Sexual Power and a World Without Rape
- Website: jaclynfriedman.com

Jaclyn Friedman (/ˈfriːdmən/; born 1971) is an American feminist writer and activist known as the co-editor (with Jessica Valenti) of Yes Means Yes: Visions of Sexual Power and a World Without Rape and Believe Me: How Trusting Women Can Change the World, the writer of Unscrewed: Women, Sex, Power and How to Stop Letting the System Screw Us All and What You Really Really Want: The Smart Girl’s Shame-Free Guide To Sex and Safety, the founder and executive director of EducateUS, an organization focused on building a movement of voters laser-focused on advancing sex education across the country. She is also a campus speaker on issues of feminism, sexual freedom and anti-rape activism, and the founder and former executive director of Women, Action & The Media.

== Background ==
Friedman graduated from Wesleyan University, and later earned an MFA in creative writing from Emerson College in 2004. She was sexually assaulted on campus while an undergraduate student.

She lives in the Boston area.

She is bisexual.

== Women, Action & the Media ==
Friedman is the founder and former executive director of Women, Action & the Media (WAM!), a North American non-profit focusing on gender justice and media issues. WAM!'s accomplishments included the successful campaigns to pressure Facebook to enforce its terms of service against incitements to violence against women and to pressure Clear Channel to rescind its decision not to run advertisements for South Wind Women's Center, a women's health clinic in Wichita. WAM! also ran chapters in Boston, New York City, Chicago, Los Angeles, Washington, D.C., Ottawa, and Vancouver.

== Other activism ==
Friedman regularly speaks at college campuses on the subjects of sexuality, sexualization, rape culture, and creating a healthy sexual culture around enthusiastic consent. She also hosts a weekly podcast Unscrewed.

In 2010 Friedman was selected as a delegate on the Nobel Women's Initiative's peace delegation to Israel and Palestine. A documentary, Partners for Peace, has been made about the delegation, and Friedman is featured in the film.

In 2019, Friedman was arrested as part of Never Again Action, a group of Jews and allies protesting ICE and the government's treatment of immigrants. In an interview with the Jewish Women's Archive, she identified a Reform Jewish youth group chapter in New Jersey, known as NFTY, as the source of her social justice framework.

Friedman is the 2019-2020 Activist in Residence at Suffolk University.

== Controversy ==
In December 2010, Friedman debated Naomi Wolf on Democracy Now! concerning rape allegations against WikiLeaks founder Julian Assange, in which Wolf controversially described allegations of stealthing against Assange as representing “model cases of sexual negotiation.”

In 2012, Friedman came under fire for her piece, Unsolicited Advice For Blue Ivy Carter, which was heavily criticized by African-American women for alleged racist overtones. Friedman subsequently issued a public apology on her blog, and donated the fee she received for the piece to SisterSong, an activist group that primarily deals with women of color.

== Writing ==
Yes Means Yes: Visions of Sexual Power and a World Without Rape, an anthology co-edited by Friedman and Jessica Valenti, was published in January 2009. It was selected as one of Publishers Weekly Best 100 Books of 2009, and is number 11 on Ms. magazine's list of Most Influential Feminist Books of All Time.

In 2011, inspired by the questions that young women asked her while she was on book tour for Yes Means Yes, Friedman published her second book, What You Really Really Want: The Smart Girl’s Shame-Free Guide to Sex and Safety. What You Really Really Want was a finalist for Foreword's Book of the Year award in Women's Issues. Salon.com called it "a sex guide for today's girls," and said of Friedman that she "is the sex educator of many parents' nightmares. She’s also just the teacher young women need".

In 2017, Friedman published Unscrewed: Women, Sex, Power, and How to Stop Letting the System Screw Us All. Kirkus described Unscrewed as "a potent, convincing manifesto" and the text "lively, emboldening and nonjudgmental".

In 2020, Friedman and co-editor Jessica Valenti published a second anthology, Believe Me: How Trusting Women Can Change the World. Believe Me includes essays by Congresswoman Ayanna Pressley, Tatiana Maslany, Samantha Irby, Dahlia Lithwick, Loretta Ross, Jamil Smith, Julia Serano, and more. Publishers Weekly wrote: "Consistently well-written and soundly reasoned, these essays persuasively cast the tendency to doubt women as one of America’s greatest social ills. This illuminating call to action deserves a wide readership."

Friedman's writings have been published widely, including in The New York Times, Glamour The Guardian, The American Prospect,The Washington Post, The Nation and Salon.

== Media ==
Friedman has appeared as an expert on many shows, including Nightline, NPR’s 1A, PBS NewsHour, and Democracy Now. She has also appeared on many leading podcasts such as Dear Sugars and Call Your Girlfriend.
