= Revo (organisation) =

British membership organisation for retail property industry

Revo, (Retail Evolution), previously the British Council of Shopping Centres (BCSC) is a non-profit professional body and membership organisation in the United Kingdom serving the retail property and placemaking industry.

== Overview ==
Revo represents the interests of its members, sets standards and brings people together to collaborate and create tangible changes in the retail property market.

Its aim is to foster a professional, socially responsible and progressive retail property industry while enhancing members' commercial advantage through events, award and education programmes, research publications and influencing local and national government policy.

The organisation was founded in 1983, and it is headquartered in London. Its chief executive is Vivienne King.
