= Kate Harding =

American feminist writer

- Born: c. 1975 (age 50–51)
- Education: University of Toronto; Vermont College of Fine Arts (MFA)
- Occupation: Writer
- Era: 21st century
- Known for: Shapely Prose; Lessons From the Fat-o-Sphere; Asking For It; Nasty Women

Kate Harding (born c. 1975) is an American feminist and fat-acceptance writer. She was founding editor of the Shapely Prose blog, author of Asking For It: The Alarming Rise of Rape Culture—and What We Can Do About It, co-author of Lessons From the Fat-o-Sphere: Quit Dieting and Declare a Truce with Your Body, and co-editor of anthology Nasty Women: Feminism, Resistance, and Revolution in Trump's America.

== Early life ==
Harding attended the University of Toronto for college, majoring in English, then earned an MFA in fiction from Vermont College of Fine Arts.

== Career ==
Harding was founding editor of a blog called Shapely Prose, which she edited from 2007 to 2010.

Hard is co-author, with Marianne Kirby, of the 2009 book Lessons From the Fat-o-Sphere: Quit Dieting and Declare a Truce with Your Body (Penguin/Perigee).

In 2015, Harding published Asking For It: The Alarming Rise of Rape Culture—and What We Can Do About It. In Slate, Amanda Marcotte described Harding's approach in the book as "working as a cultural critic, focusing on the cultural response to and understanding of sexual assault more than the crimes themselves". In the Los Angeles Times, Rebecca Carroll called the book "a smart, impassioned and well-researched agenda for a strictly no-nonsense understanding of rape culture."

In 2017, Harding co-edited an anthology with Samhita Mukhopadhyay, entitled Nasty Women: Feminism, Resistance, and Revolution in Trump's America.

== Personal life ==
Harding is married and lives in Chicago.

She has referred to herself as "a lapsed Catholic turned atheist".
