= Meredith G. F. Worthen =

American sociologist

Academic background
- Education: University of Texas at Austin
- Thesis: The color of friendship : gender, race/ethnicity, and the relationships between friendship and delinquency (2009)

Meredith Gwynne Fair Worthen is a professor in the Department of Sociology at the University of Oklahoma. Her research areas include sexualities and LGBTQ studies. She is the author of Queers, Bis, and Straight Lies: An Intersectional Examination of LGBTQ Stigma and Sexual Deviance and Society: A sociological examination.

== Early life and education ==
Worthen was raised in Dallas, Texas. She attended the University of Texas for her BA, MA, and PhD, and completed her PhD in sociology in 2009. Her thesis was titled The color of friendship gender, race/ethnicity, and the relationships between friendship and delinquency, and was supervised by Mark Warr.

== Career ==
In 2009, Worthen became an assistant professor at the University of Oklahoma, and then received tenure in 2014. She was promoted to full professor in 2019.

Her research focus includes the study of stigma, as well as deviance, feminist criminology, sexualities, and LGBTQ identities.

In 2016, she published the textbook Sexual Deviance and Society: A sociological examination.

In her first empirical book, Queers, Bis, and Straight Lies: An Intersectional Examination of LGBTQ Stigma, published in 2020, Worthen developed Norm-Centered Stigma Theory (NCST) as part of a sociological examination of stigma.

After moving to Oklahoma, Worthen founded The Welcoming Project in 2011, which became a nonprofit organization after initially being developed to promote the display of welcoming messages to people in the LGBTQ community at businesses and organizations, including on websites. In 2018, she created the Instagram account Me Too Meredith, to facilitate anonymous reporting of sexual harassment and assault.

== Selected works ==
=== Books ===
- Worthen, Meredith G. F. (2016). Sexual Deviance and Society: A sociological examination. Routledge. ISBN 9781138819078. (2nd ed., 2022 ISBN 9780367539412)
- Worthen, Meredith G. F. (2020). Queers, Bis, and Straight Lies: An Intersectional Examination of LGBTQ Stigma. Routledge. ISBN 9781138241459.
- Worthen, Meredith (2023). Interrogating the Use of LGBTQ Slurs: Still Smearing the Queer?. London: Routledge. ISBN 9781003290506.

=== Book chapters ===
- Marc A. Musick; Meredith G. F. Worthen (2010). "The Study of Religion and Health at the Turn of the Century". In Ellison, Christopher G.; Hummer, Robert A. (eds.). Religion, Families, and Health: Population-Based Research in the United States. Rutgers University Press. pp. 248–272. ISBN 9780813549453.
- Meredith G. F. Worthen; Danielle Dirks (2015). "Gender and Deviance". In Goode, Erich (ed.). The Handbook of Deviance. John Wiley & Sons, Inc. pp. 277–297. ISBN 9781118701423.
- Meredith G. F. Worthen (2022). "Gender- and Sexuality-Based Violence among LGBTQ People: An Empirical Test of Norm-Centered Stigma Theory". In Buist, Carrie; Semprevivo, Lindsay Kahle (eds.). Queering Criminology in Theory and Praxis: Reimagining Justice in the Criminal Legal System and Beyond. Bristol University Press. pp. 13–31. ISBN 9781529210712.
- Meredith G. F. Worthen (2022). "Survivor Criminology as a Scholar/Activist in the #MeToo Movement and #MeToo Activism". In Cook, Kimberly J.; Lamphere, Reneè D.; Williams, Jason M.; Mallicoat, Stacy L.; Ackerman, Alissa R. (eds.). Survivor Criminology: A Radical Act of Hope. Rowman & Littlefield Publishers. ISBN 978-1-5381-5169-3.

=== Encyclopedia entry ===
- Meredith G. F. Worthen (2011). "Fraternities". In Barnett, George A. (ed.). Encyclopedia of Social Networks. Sage Publications. pp. 297–301. ISBN 9781412979115.

=== Studies ===
- Worthen, Meredith G. F. (December 4, 2018). ""All the Gays Are Liberal?" Sexuality and Gender Gaps in Political Perspectives among Lesbian, Gay, Bisexual, Mostly Heterosexual, and Heterosexual College Students in the Southern USA". Sexuality Research and Social Policy. 17: 27–42. doi:10.1007/s13178-018-0365-6.

== Personal life ==
Worthen is married to her long-time partner and they have a daughter.
