= Jessica Valenti =

American feminist author and blogger (born 1978)

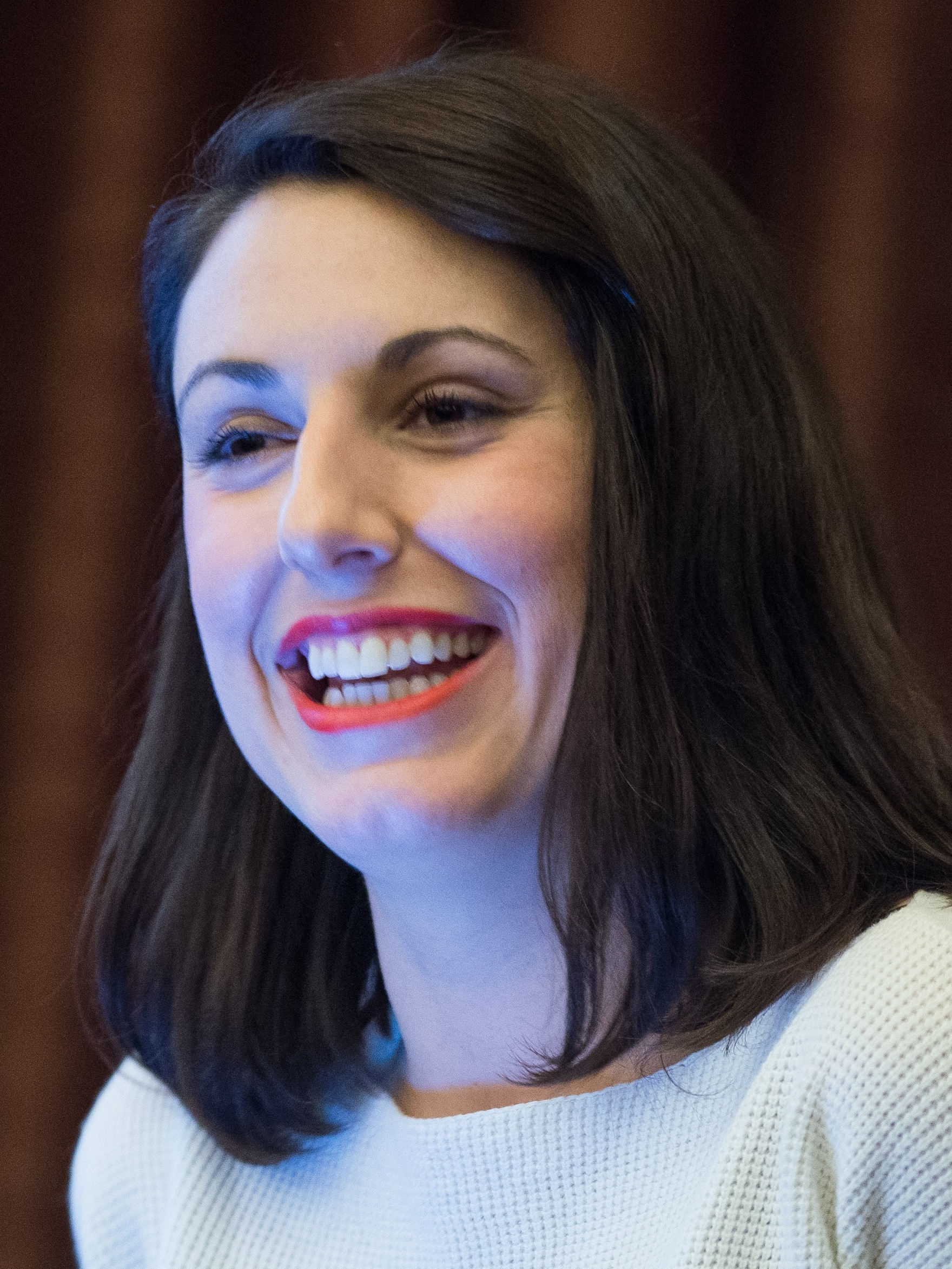
- Valenti in 2014
- Born: November 1, 1978 (age 47); New York City, U.S.
- Education: SUNY Albany; Rutgers University
- Known for: Founder of Feministing
- Spouse: Andrew Golis (m. 2009)
- Children: 1
- Website: www.jessicavalenti.com

Jessica Valenti (/vəˈlɛnti/ və-LEN-tee; born November 1, 1978) is an American feminist writer. She was the co-founder of the blog Feministing, which she wrote for from 2004 to 2011. Valenti is the author of six books: Full Frontal Feminism (2007), He's a Stud, She's a Slut (2008), The Purity Myth (2009), Why Have Kids? (2012), Sex Object: A Memoir (2016), and Abortion: Our Bodies, Their Lies, and the Truths We Use to Win (2024). She also co-edited the books Yes Means Yes: Visions of Female Sexual Power and A World Without Rape (2008), Believe Me: How Trusting Women Can Change the World (2020). Between 2014 and 2018, Valenti was a columnist for The Guardian. She currently runs the Abortion, Every Day newsletter. Fellow feminist Michelle Goldberg described her as "one of the most successful and visible feminists of her generation".

== Early life and education ==
Valenti was raised in Long Island City, Queens, in an Italian-American family. She graduated from Stuyvesant High School in New York City in 1996 and attended Tulane University in New Orleans for a year, and then transferred to the State University of New York at Albany, graduating in 2001 with a bachelor's degree in journalism. In 2002, Valenti received a master's degree in Women's and Gender Studies with a concentration in politics from Rutgers University.

== Career ==
After graduating from college, Valenti worked for the NOW Legal Defense and Education Fund and for the Women's Environment & Development Organization. She wrote a blog for NARAL Pro-Choice America and also taught at Rutgers University from 2008 to 2010.

=== Feministing ===
In April 2004, Valenti co-founded Feministing with her sister and a friend while she was working at the National Organization for Women's legal defense fund (now Legal Momentum). Homa Khaleeli writes in The Guardian's top 100 women that the site shifted the feminist movement online, triggering the creation of blogs and discussion groups, creating a heyday for feminism just as its death was being announced, as Khaleeli puts it. She writes that Valenti "felt the full force of being a pioneer," her involvement with the site attracting online abuse, even threats of rape and death.

Kymberly Blackstock included Feministing in her review of feminist blogs, praising them for being "successful in giving a new generation the chance to engage with as well as begin to direct which topics will rise to the top of the feminist agenda". While she criticized Valenti for the blog's lack of involvement in global issues. She also writes that blogs like Feministing are helpful in encouraging activism in young people, and allow them to see current events with a feminist lens.

University of Wisconsin–Madison law professor Ann Althouse criticized Feministing in 2006 for its sometimes sexualized content. Erin Matson of the National Organization for Women's Young Feminist Task Force told The Huffington Post the controversy was "a rehashing of a very old debate within the feminist community: is public sexuality empowering or harmful to women?"

Valenti left the site in February 2011, saying she wanted it to remain a place for younger feminists.

=== Writing ===
In 2007, Valenti wrote Full Frontal Feminism, where she discusses the ways in which readers can benefit from being feminists.

In 2008, Valenti published He's a Stud, She's a Slut and 49 Other Double Standards Every Woman Should Know.

In 2008, Valenti was the co-editor of Yes Means Yes: Visions of Female Sexual Power and A World Without Rape with Jaclyn Friedman. The anthology featured a foreword by comedian Margaret Cho.

In 2009, Valenti published (via Seal Press) The Purity Myth: How America's Obsession with Virginity Is Hurting Young Women, about the way ideals about women's sexuality are being used to weaken women's rights. A documentary film based on the book, called The Purity Myth, was released in 2011 by the Media Education Foundation.

In 2012, Valenti published Why Have Kids? A New Mom Explores the Truth About Parenting and Happiness.

In 2016, Valenti published Sex Object: A Memoir with the Dey Street imprint of Morrow. The book was a memoir, a departure from Valenti's prior books.

Also in 2016, one of the Podesta emails mentions, alongside Valenti's name, a column she was writing for The Guardian.

In 2020, Valenti was the co-editor of the anthology Believe Me: How Trusting Women Can Change the World with Jaclyn Friedman.

Valenti's writing has appeared in Diane Mapes' Single State of the Union: Single Women Speak Out on Life, Love, and the Pursuit of Happiness (2007), Melody Berger's We Don't Need Another Wave: Dispatches from the Next Generation of Feminists (2008), and Courtney E. Martin and J. Courtney Sullivan's book, Click: When We Knew We Were Feminists (2010).

Her work has appeared in Ms., The Washington Post, AlterNet, as well as other publications. Valenti wrote for The Nation from 2008 to 2014. Since 2014, Valenti has written regularly for The Guardian, where she is a columnist. She also writes a newsletter, Abortion, Every Day, about abortion laws after the overturning of Roe v. Wade.

== Harassment ==
Valenti has been the target of online threats and harassment throughout her career. In a 2006 blog article by Liz Funk at HuffPost, Funk wrote about online attacks made about Valenti after a group photo that included Valenti at a luncheon with former President Bill Clinton went viral, focusing on her outfit.

In July 2016, Valenti announced she was taking a break from social media, after receiving rape and death threats aimed at her then five-year-old daughter. On Twitter, Valenti denounced the harassment as unacceptable. Immediately after that, Valenti made her Instagram account private.

== Personal life ==
Valenti has written that she had an abortion when she was twenty-eight years old.

In 2009, Valenti married Andrew Golis, former deputy publisher of Talking Points Memo, former general manager of Vox Media, and currently the chief content officer for WNYC.

The couple has one daughter, born in 2010. Valenti has written that she had HELLP syndrome when she was pregnant, and that her daughter was born prematurely.

== Honors ==
- 2010: Independent Publisher Book Awards for Gold: The Purity Myth: How America's Obsession with Virginity Is Hurting Young Women
- 2011: The Hillman Prize, Blog for Feministing
- 2011: The Guardian, Top 100 Inspiring Women
- 2014: Planned Parenthood Federation of America, Media Award for Commentary at The Guardian for "The Body Politic" column
- 2014: Humanist Heroine Award, American Humanist Association
- Ibis Reproductive Health, Evidence in Activism Award
- Choice USA Generation Award

== Works and publications ==
=== Books ===
- Valenti, Jessica (2007). Full Frontal Feminism: A Young Woman's Guide to Why Feminism Matters. Berkeley, CA: Seal Press. ISBN 978-0-7867-5048-1. OCLC 885208868.
- Valenti, Jessica (2008). He's a Stud, She's a Slut, and 49 Other Double Standards Every Woman Should Know. Berkeley, CA: Seal Press. ISBN 978-0-7867-5049-8. OCLC 693762010.
- Cho, Margaret (foreword by) (2008). Friedman, Jaclyn; Valenti, Jessica (eds.). Yes Means Yes!: Visions of Female Sexual Power & a World Without Rape. Berkeley, CA: Seal Press. ISBN 978-0-7867-2705-6. OCLC 537193942.
- Valenti, Jessica (2009). The Purity Myth: How America's Obsession with Virginity Is Hurting Young Women. Berkeley, CA: Seal Press. ISBN 978-0-7867-4466-4. OCLC 435970405.
- Valenti, Jessica (2012). Why Have Kids?: A New Mom Explores the Truth about Parenting and Happiness. Boston, MA: Houghton Mifflin Harcourt. ISBN 978-0-5478-9261-0. OCLC 785865777.
  - Valenti, Jessica (September 19, 2012). "Not Wanting Kids Is Entirely Normal". The Atlantic (excerpt).
- Valenti, Jessica (2016). Sex Object: A Memoir. New York, NY: Dey Street Books. ISBN 978-0-0624-3508-8. OCLC 991056136.
  - Valenti, Jessica (May 28, 2016). "Jessica Valenti: my life as a 'sex object'". The Guardian. – extract
- Valenti, Jessica; Friedman, Jaclyn (2020). Valenti, Jessica; Friedman, Jaclyn (eds.). Believe Me: How Trusting Women Can Change the World. New York, NY: Seal Press. ISBN 9781580058797.
- Valenti, Jessica (2024). Abortion: Our Bodies, Their Lies, and the Truths We Use to Win. New York, NY: Crown. ISBN 978-0593800232.

=== Anthologies ===
- Valenti, Jessica (2007). "The Taming of the Threw". In Mapes, Diane (ed.). Single State of the Union: Single Women Speak Out on Life, Love, and the Pursuit of Happiness. Seal Press. ISBN 978-1-5800-5202-3. OCLC 76897638.
- Valenti, Jessica (2008). "You're a Feminist. Deal". In Melody, Berger (ed.). We Don't Need Another Wave: Dispatches from the Next Generation of Feminists. Seal Press. pp. 23–27. ISBN 978-0-7867-5088-7. OCLC 834136882.
- Valenti, Jessica; Cho, Margaret (foreword by) (2008). "Purely Rape: The Myth of Sexual Purity and How It Reinforces Rape Culture". In Friedman, Jaclyn; Valenti, Jessica (eds.). Yes Means Yes!: Visions of Female Sexual Power & a World Without Rape. Berkeley, CA: Seal Press. pp. 299–304. ISBN 978-0-7867-2705-6. OCLC 537193942.
- Valenti, Jessica (2010). "I Was an Obnoxious Teenage Feminist". In Martin, Courtney E.; Sullivan, J. Courtney (eds.). Click: When We Knew We Were Feminists. Berkeley, CA: Seal Press. pp. 215–218. ISBN 978-1-5800-5285-6. OCLC 748361770.
- Valenti, Jessica; Friedman, Jaclyn (2020). Valenti, Jessica; Friedman, Jaclyn (eds.). Believe Me: How Trusting Women Can Change the World. New York, NY: Seal Press. ISBN 9781580058797.

=== Selected publications ===
- Valenti, Jessica (February 7, 2006). "Losing Our Feminist Leaders". AlterNet.
- Valenti, Jessica (April 5, 2007). "How the web became a sexists' paradise". The Guardian.
- Valenti, Jessica (March 6, 2008). "The Sisterhood Split". The Nation. Archived from the original on November 7, 2019.
- Valenti, Jessica (February 21, 2010). "For women in America, equality is still an illusion". The Washington Post.
- Valenti, Jessica (May 30, 2010). "Opinion: The fake feminism of Sarah Palin". The Washington Post.
- Valenti, Jessica (June 3, 2011). "Opinion: SlutWalks and the future of feminism". The Washington Post.
- Valenti, Jessica (November 29, 2012). "She Who Dies With the Most 'Likes' Wins?". The Nation. Archived from the original on November 7, 2019.
- Valenti, Jessica (January 4, 2013). "America's Rape Problem: We Refuse to Admit That There Is One". The Nation.
- Valenti, Jessica (October 3, 2014). "'Our daughter is dead. We're the surviving victims': rape, bullying and suicide, after a viral flood". The Guardian.
- Valenti, Jessica (June 4, 2016). "Opinion: What Does a Lifetime of Leers Do to Us?". The New York Times.
- Valenti, Jessica (March 28, 2018). "On The Atlantic, Jeffrey Goldberg, and hiring men who want women dead". Medium.
- Valenti, Jessica (July 31, 2020). "The Pandemic Isn't Forcing Moms Out of the Workforce - Dads Are". Medium.
- Valenti, Jessica (July 23, 2020). "Why Men Won't Apologize". Medium.

=== Other ===
- The Purity Myth (Short documentary). Northampton, MA: Media Education Foundation. 2011. ISBN 978-1-9328-6956-9. OCLC 978241817. – Based on Valenti's book and features Valenti
- Valenti, Jessica (foreword by) (2012). Barcella, Laura (ed.). Madonna & Me: Women Writers on the Queen of Pop. Berkeley, CA: Soft Skull Press. ISBN 978-1-5937-6429-6. OCLC 746834433.
