= Cisgenderism =

Ideology about two genders only

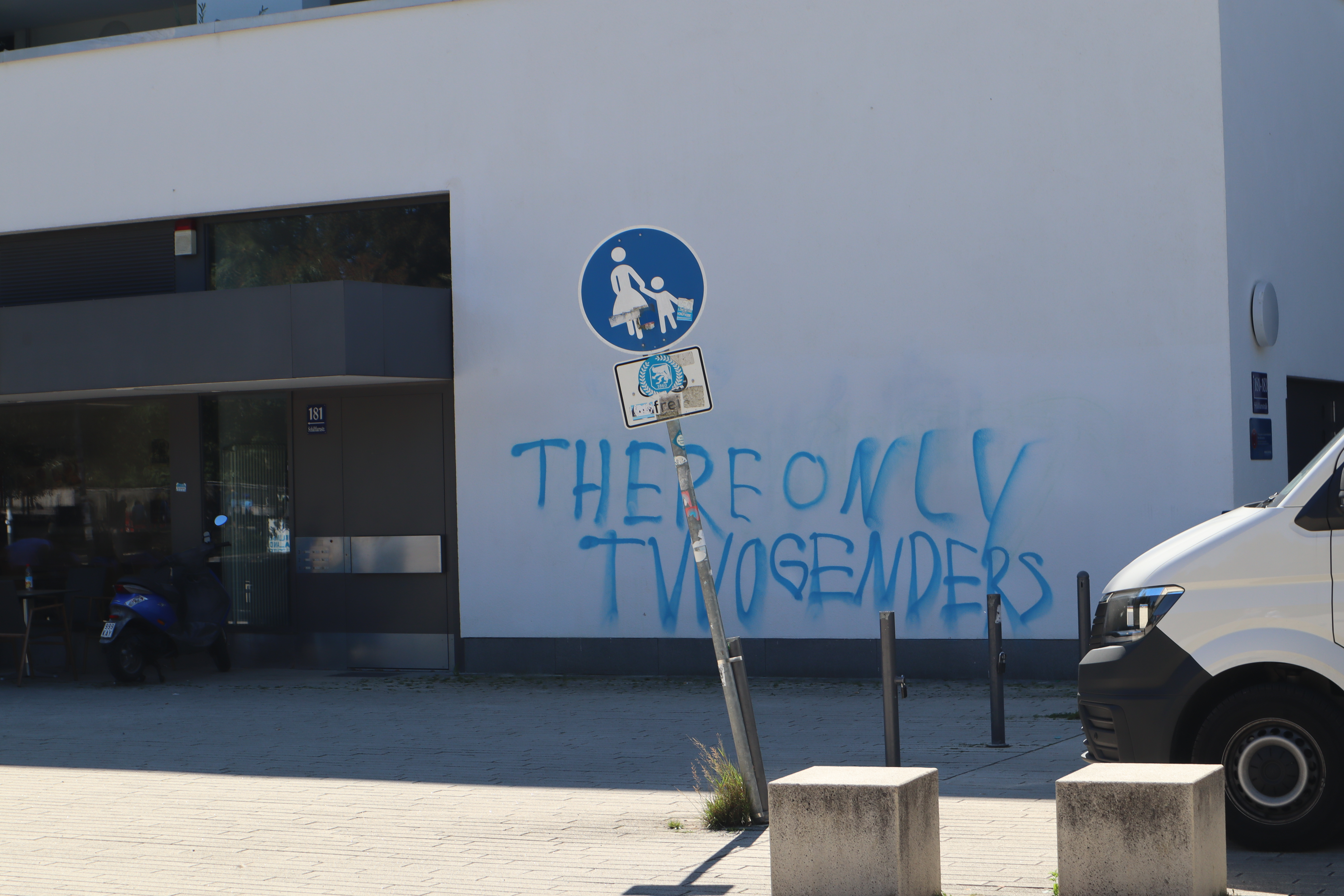
Cisgenderist graffiti in Munich, Germany stating "There only [sic] two genders"

Cisgenderism (also called cissexism, genderism, or gender binarism) is the ideology that there are only two genders, and that one's gender should conform to one's assigned sex at birth. This normative belief stigmatizes gender nonconformity, and leads to discrimination against transgender and intersex people. It is pervasive and systematic in Western culture, and reflected in the cultural and legal practices across numerous countries.

The concept of cisgenderism originated in trans studies in order to distinguish transphobia at an interpersonal level from anti-transgender prejudice at a cultural or systemic level. This is analogous to heterosexism, as contrasted with homophobia.

== Definition ==
From etymology and origins, cisgenderism is the belief that a person's gender is their sex at birth. Yet, The SAGE Encyclopedia of Trans Studies defines cisgenderism as "an umbrella term for systemic oppression that treats some people’s understanding of themselves as invalid". It can affect all people, including those who are cisgender.

The SAGE Encyclopedia of Trans Studies claims that cisgenderism is defined in opposition to transphobia, as heterosexism is to homophobia. While transphobia focuses on attitudes towards people seen as transgender, cisgenderism is described as an ideology. Critique of cisgenderism also criticizes the very distinction between cisgender and transgender people. These concepts arise from Western culture with the gender binary peculiar to it, and are inapplicable to societies with other views on gender. Non-binary and intersex people also cause problems for the cisgender and transgender dichotomy..

== Characteristics ==
Cisgenderism relies on the assumption that there are only two sex and gender categories, that gender is unchanging through life, and that it should be assigned by external authorities. In doing this, it ignores intersex people as well as societies where these assumptions do not hold true. People who do not conform to these assumptions are categorized as transgender. They are also portrayed as "deviant, immoral, and even threatening". Cisgenderism further justifies prejudice, discrimination, and violence in order to preserve itself.

== Consequences ==
Cisgenderism has a variety of consequences for its targets, intentionally or not. It may result in people's gender identities being pathologized or seen as disordered. This can contribute to depression, and make mental health care harder to access. It can also marginalize people for their gender identities, leading to strain and higher risks of ridicule and hate crime. Coercive queering, another manifestation of cisgenderism, is classifying someone as LGBT against their wishes. It may also be lumping transgender rights issues together with lesbian, gay, and bisexual issues without actually addressing problems specific to transgender people. Misgendering and objectification by reducing people to their physical characteristics are also consequences of cisgenderism. In addition to these overt consequences of cisgenderism, trans erasure, whereby the challenges transgender people face are not represented in dominant discourses, is also a result of cisgenderism. Passing is a way to avoid consequences of cisgenderism, by outwardly conforming with cisgenderist norms.

== See also ==
- Anti-gender movement
- Systemic bias
