= Jacqueline Left Hand Bull =

Prominent American Indian Bahá'í

- Born: Jacqueline Ferron; 1943 (age 82–83)
- Other names: Jacqueline Left Hand Bull-Delahunt, Jacqueline Delahunt
- Citizenship: American, Sicangu Lakota
- Education: Evergreen State College
- Occupation: Indian public health policy
- Known for: Continental Counselor 1988–2001, Chair of Baháʼí National Spiritual Assembly of the United States 2007–2011, Children's book author

Jacqueline Left Hand Bull (formerly Delahunt, born in 1943), member of the Sicangu Lakota of the Rosebud Sioux Tribe, was brought up in her view in a traditional Lakota way by her grandparents and parents. She became a member of the Baháʼí Faith in 1981, appointed a Continental Counselor in 1988, and was elected as Chair of the National Spiritual Assembly of the Baháʼís of the United States in 2007. The family history of the name "Left Hand Bull" involves the elder brother of a family who had done the difficult task of hunting a Buffalo from the left side and was known to provide for more than his family in his hunting. Years later the younger brother reconnected with the elder and undertook to greatly honor the elder in a ceremony and in return the elder brother traded his name. She shares a short stature with this younger brother who was given the name "Left Hand Bull".

== Early years ==
She has described her upbringing with her family as "traditional" on the Rosebud Indian Reservation. Her parents were Robert Richard Ferron and Corinne Bordeaux. She was one of their six children, who were also among the many great-grandchildren of Luther Standing Bear. Her uncle was Adam Bordeaux, a well known cultural educator and a revered spiritual leader on the Rosebud Reservation whom she describes as "a holy man with healing powers." However she was also raised Catholic but was conflicted by the world views of the Catholic and Native experiences of her growing years. She attended a Catholic high school and then graduated from Hot Springs High School, Hot Springs, SD in 1961 while living with her mother after her parents divorced. She then earned a bachelor's degree from Evergreen State College in 1974 while living with her father in Olympia, Washington with a major in community development. A brother of hers was killed about then and this was a major challenge to her spiritual understanding. She married soon after and had two sons with a strong Catholic basis in her family while living in Montana. On moving back to Olympia she became distanced from the Catholic Church and learned of the Baháʼí Faith from an Indian newspaper in the late 1970s.

== As a Baháʼí ==
In 1981 she converted to the Baháʼí Faith after several encounters with adherents. Important Baháʼí teachings for her in her investigation of the religion in respecting her Indian heritage, her beliefs as a Catholic, and beyond were the positions and teachings of the Baháʼí Faith on gender equality and progressive revelation. On the basis of the principles of the religion, she converted. So important is gender equality in her understanding years later that she said: "…there will not be world peace until the equality of women and men are established, not just theoretical, but established." However, there was some estrangement between her and her first formal contact with the community of Baháʼís through a delegated individual. This person felt her activities in the women's movement and seeking Indigenous rights and facing Stereotypes of Native Americans were divisive. Her other initial encounters left her ambivalent about the religion. She gained a more personal faith in the religion after coming in contact with a heartfelt friend and went on Baháʼí pilgrimage in 1983. Soon after she divorced though she maintains this had nothing to do with her change in faith but her immediate and extended family did not accept her change of faith. Shortly she worked at the Baháʼí national center and was appointed to the committee on American Indian teaching, where she was a liaison to the many American Indians who had become Baháʼís. In 1984 she participated in the Trail of Light event of North American indigenous Baháʼís traveling with Latin American indigenous peoples among the lands of Latin America. In 1987 she participated in the 75th anniversary commemoration of ʻAbdu'l-Bahá's journeys to the West at the Baháʼí House of Worship in Wilmette, Illinois. She was appointed a Continental Counselor, the highest office of individual standing in the religion, in 1988. She attended the 1988 Baháʼí Indigenous Council, and the next tour of the Trail of Light team this time keeping a diary of events over the three weeks journey as they went through Latin America. She co-chaired the 1989 Association of Baháʼí Studies conference in Canada and traveled to Finland to attend an indigenous event there for the Sami people.

She was interviewed in 1993 in a documentary and production covering the Parliament of Religions called The Parliament of Souls which was aired in 1995 over PBS/VisionTV Canada and American Forces Network and there was a companion book published. During the interview she openly declared her personal belief that "White Buffalo Calf Woman has returned. Not in the same form that she came in the first time but really in the teachings of Baháʼu'lláh." She did an extensive interview with Patricia Locke as well as statements made in multiple situations further echoing these sentiments.

During that 1993 Parliament of Religions she and Patricia Locke, as part of the Native delegation and speaking as Baháʼí delegates, attempted to have a resolution adopted by the Parliament named "American Indian Declaration of Vision 1993" which said in part:

One hundred years ago, during the 1893 Parliament of World Religions, the profoundly religious Original Peoples of the Western Hemisphere were not invited. We are still here and still struggling to be heard for the sake of our Mother Earth and our children. Our spiritual and physical survival continues to be threatened all over the hemisphere, we feel compelled to ask you to join us in restoring the balances of humanity and Mother Earth in these ways:
- Acknowledgement of the myriad of messengers of the Creator, the Great Mystery, to the peoples of the Western Hemisphere.
- Support in promoting, preserving and maintaining our Indigenous languages and cultures.

The resolution was initially adopted by a near-unanimous vote by the delegates yet was ultimately nullified by the Chair of the Council Parliament, who overruled the vote because of a conflict over the Inter caetera Bull and the basic roll of the Parliament to discuss rather than take action.

Shortly after 2001 she was elected to the National Spiritual Assembly of the Baháʼís of the United States and had to release her service as a counsellor. She served as Vice Chair some five years of the organization. Then she was elected as chair, for the first time, in 2007. She was the first American Indian woman to so serve since its formation in 1925. Other Indians had been elected to the institution – MacArthur Fellow Patricia Locke, Lakota hoop dancer and flutist Kevin Locke, and Navajo artists and brothers Franklin and Chester Kahn. She served as Chair through 2011. In 2012 she was elected vice-chair. As members of a national assembly are delegates to elect the Universal House of Justice she has taken part.

== Professional work ==
Professionally she took a stand on the importance of breastfeeding in 2005 as the Northern Plains Healthy Start Program project director when she brought in training for other agencies in Rapid City, SD. In 2007 she was the Administrative Officer of the "Aberdeen Area Tribal Chairmen's Health Board" in Rapid City. She contributed to an article reviewing transcultural issues in nursing published in 2009. By about 2010 she was living and working in Portland Oregon as the Administrative Officer of Northwest Portland Area Indian Health Board that serves 43 Native American tribes in the Pacific Northwest with input on health issue delivery policies and resources. In 2011 she opened sessions of the American Association of Physicians of Indian Origin 40th Annual Meeting and National Health Conference. In 2012 she served on the board of the Prevention Research Centers initiative of the Oregon Health & Science University Center for Healthy Communities.

== Individual initiatives ==
She has cooperated with Kevin Locke several times - for example a 1995 musical CD of his music in the program notes and she authored a book for children, "Lakota Hoop Dancer," in 1998 about his work as a hoop dancer. This book has been used fairly widely since its publication more than a decade ago:

1. it is used in elementary school curricula at local and national levels
2. it is used in college, tribal, and other presentations on Indian culture

She has also consulted with the North Dakota Arts Council and North Dakota Art Gallery Association in development of the Art Resources for Teaching Standards (ARTS) Trunk Program - specifically the "Games and Storytelling Trunk" - currently for use by teachers.

As a leading Lakota Baháʼí and member of the national assembly she is also of interest as a speaker because of her continued and long service. In 2009 she was the keynote speaker at the Portland Mayor's Inter-faith Luncheon attended the 2010 Association for Baháʼí Studies conference in Canada and was interviewed for an hour for a podcast radio program. In 2012 she was on the list to speak at the opening of the Washington Bahaʼi History Museum, in Bellevue, Washington in December as well as the 2012 Rabbani Trust Baha'i Conference in Orlando, Florida.

== See also ==
- Baháʼí Faith and Native Americans
- Native American religion
