= Phoebe Eng =

Asian American national lecturer

Phoebe Eng is a Taiwanese-American national lecturer on race and social justice issues who has been featured in several publications, including The New York Times, The Wall Street Journal, and Newsweek. She is the author of Warrior Lessons: An Asian American Woman's Journey into Power, a memoir-based exploration of Asian American women's lives and challenges.

== Personal life ==
Eng was born in Philadelphia, PA. Her father's family is from Taishan, Guandong Province and her mother's family is from Hsinchu, Taiwan. She and her family lived in Westbury, NY, relatively isolated from the large Chinese American community in New York City. Her first experience with large numbers of Asian Americans was when she left home to attend the University of California, Berkeley.

After her graduation from UC Berkeley, she returned to her home state to attend the New York University School of Law, driven by what she described as "pressure to earn a recognizable badge of approval." At NYU School of Law she was involved in efforts to pressure the law school administration regarding issues of racism and diversity on campus. Eng, L. Londell McMillan, Muntu Masimela and other law students met with then-dean John Sexton to propose the creation of a committee to investigate racial bias, plans to admit more minority students and hire more minority faculty, and a course on race relations and the law.

== Career ==
Eng started her legal career as a mergers and acquisitions lawyer with the firm Coudert Brothers in New York and Hong Kong. In 1992 she joined A. Magazine, launching the publication nationally with its founders in August 1993 as its Publisher. Describing her motivations in 1993 she stated, "it’s very necessary for Asian-Americans to own their own media, to own their own stations, for instance, to put forth the views in their own voices".

In 2002, Eng became a director of the Social Change Communication Project, a research initiative sponsored by the Ford Foundation. In 2005, she co-founded the national policy and communications group, The Opportunity Agenda, with Alan Jenkins, Brian D. Smedley, and Bill Lann Lee, and served as the organization's Creative Director. In 2006, she was named to a four-year term on the board of directors of the Ms. Foundation for Women, a national women's philanthropic organization founded by Gloria Steinem, Marlo Thomas and Letty Pogrebin.

Eng was also an initial and co-founding member of the Asian Women Leadership Network, the largest network of professional Asian American women in the country, and was a Founding Sister of both the Asian Women's Center (formerly Asian Pacific American Women's Leadership Institute) and the National Asian Pacific American Women's Forum, based in Washington, D.C.

== Works ==
Eng's writing has focused on the themes of women's empowerment, and social, racial, and environmental justice. Her 1999 book Warrior Lessons: An Asian American Woman's Journey into Power was reviewed by various publications including The New York Times, Kirkus Reviews, and Ricepaper.

She contributed the foreword to Yell-oh Girls! (2001), edited by Vickie Nam, and has contributed writings to several books and journals, including: The Greatness of Girls (2001), "Language is a Place of Struggle" (2008), Close to Home: Case Studies of Human Rights Work in the United States (2004), That Takes Ovaries! Bold Females and Their Brazen Acts (2002), Closing the Leadership Gap (2004), and the National Civic Review (2009).
