= In re Kasinga =

US case about female genital mutilation

The Matter of Kasinga was a legal case decided in June 1996 involving Fauziya Kassindja (surname also spelled as Kasinga), a Togolese teenager seeking asylum in the United States in order to escape a tribal practice of female genital mutilation (FGM). The Board of Immigration Appeals granted her asylum in June 1996 after an earlier judge denied her claims. This set a precedent in U.S. immigration law because it was the first time FGM was accepted as a form of persecution. In addition, this was the first situation in which asylum was granted based on gender.

Layli Miller-Muro, the student attorney who represented Kassindja before the immigration judge, subsequently founded the Tahirih Justice Center to provide legal aid and medical referrals to immigrant women escaping from gender-based violence and persecution. Karen Musalo, who spearheaded the litigation leading to the Board's positive decision in the case, founded the Center for Gender and Refugee Studies (CGRS), a national organization based at the University of California College of the Law, San Francisco, which works to protect and advance the rights of women, children, and LGBTI refugees that seek protection in the United States. Kassindja (aka Kasinga) is a member of the CGRS Advisory Board.

== See also ==
- Aminata Diop, a Malian woman who fled to France in 1989 to avoid FGM
