= Race and society =

Social construct of race; different understandings of race in society

Social interpretations of race regard the common categorizations of people into different races. Race is often culturally understood to be rigid categories (Black, White, Pasifika, Asian, among others) in which people can be classified based on biological markers or physical traits such as skin color, facial features, or hair type. This rigid definition of race is no longer accepted by scientific communities. Instead, the concept of 'race' is viewed as a social construct. This means, in simple terms, that it is a human invention and not a biological fact. The concept of 'race' has developed over time in order to accommodate different societies' needs of organising themselves as separate from the 'other' (globalization and colonization have caused conceptions of race to be generally consolidated). The 'other' was usually viewed as inferior and, as such, was assigned worse qualities. The current idea of race was developed primarily during the Enlightenment, in which scientists attempted to define racial boundaries, but their cultural biases ultimately impacted their findings and reproduced the prejudices that still exist in society today.

== Social interpretation of physical variation ==
=== Incongruities of racial classifications ===
The biological anthropologist Jonathan Marks (1995) argued that even as the idea of "race" was becoming a powerful organizing principle in many societies, the shortcomings of the concept were apparent. In the Old World, the gradual transition in appearances from one racial group to adjacent racial groups emphasized that "one variety of mankind does so sensibly pass into the other, that you cannot mark out the limits between them," as Blumenbach observed in his writings on human variation. In parts of the Americas, the situation was somewhat different. The immigrants to the New World came largely from widely separated regions of the Old World—western and northern Europe, western Africa, and, later, eastern Asia and southern and eastern Europe. In the Americas, the immigrant populations began to mix among themselves and with the indigenous inhabitants of the continent. In the United States, for example, most people who self-identify as African American have some European ancestors—in one analysis of genetic markers that have differing frequencies between continents, European ancestry ranged from an estimated 7% for a sample of Jamaicans to ~23% for a sample of African Americans from New Orleans. In a survey of college students who self-identified as white in a northeastern U.S. university, the west African and Native American genetic contribution were 0.7% and 3.2%.

In the United States, social and legal conventions developed over time that forced individuals of mixed ancestry into simplified racial categories. An example is the "one-drop rule" implemented in some state laws that treated anyone with a single known African American ancestor as black. The decennial censuses conducted since 1790 in the United States also created an incentive to establish racial categories and fit people into those categories. In other countries in the Americas, where mixing among groups was more extensive, social, non-racial categories have tended to be more numerous and fluid, with people moving into or out of categories on the basis of a combination of socioeconomic status, social class, and ancestry.

Efforts to sort the increasingly mixed population of the United States into discrete racial categories generated many difficulties. Additionally, efforts to track mixing between census racial groups led to a proliferation of categories (such as mulatto and octoroon) and "blood quantum" distinctions that became increasingly untethered from self-reported ancestry. A person's racial identity can change over time. One study found differences between self-ascribed race and Veterans Affairs administrative data.

=== Race as a social construct and populationism ===
The notion of a biological basis for race originally emerged through speculations surrounding the "blood purity" of Jews during the Spanish Inquisition, eventually translating to a general association of one's biology with their social and personal characteristics. In the 19th century, this recurring ideology was intensified in the development of the racial sciences, eugenics and ethnology, which meant to further categorize groups of humans in terms of biological superiority or inferiority. While the field of racial sciences, also known as scientific racism, has expired in history, these antiquated conceptions of race have persisted throughout the 21st century. (See also: Historical origins of racial classification)

Contrary to popular belief that the division of the human species based on physical variations is natural, there exists no clear, reliable distinctions that bind people to such groupings. According to the American Anthropological Association, "Evidence from the analysis of genetics (e.g., DNA) indicates that most physical variation, about 94%, lies within so-called racial groups. Conventional geographic "racial" groupings differ from one another only in about 6% of their genes." While there is a biological basis for differences in human phenotypes, most notably in skin color, the genetic variability of humans is found not amongst, but rather within racial groups – meaning the perceived level of dissimilarity amongst the species has virtually no biological basis. Genetic diversity has characterized human survival, rendering the idea of a "pure" ancestry as obsolete. Under this interpretation, race is conceptualized through a lens of artificiality, rather than through the skeleton of a scientific discovery. As a result, scholars have begun to broaden discourses of race by defining it as a social construct and exploring the historical contexts that led to its inception and persistence in contemporary society.

A significant number of historians, anthropologists, and sociologists, such as David Roediger, Jennifer K. Wagner, Tanya Golash-Boza and Ann Morning, describe human races as a social construct. They argue that it would be more accurate to use the terms 'population' or 'ancestry', which can be given a clear operational definition. However, it is common for people who reject the formal concept of race, to continue their use of the word 'race' in day-to-day language. This continuation could be credited to semantics, or to the underlying cultural significance of race within societies where racism is commonplace. Whilst the concept of race is challenged, it would be useful in medical contexts to have practical categorisation between 'individual' and 'species' because in the absence of affordable and widespread genetic tests, various race-linked gene mutations (see Cystic fibrosis, Lactose intolerance, Tay–Sachs disease and Sickle cell anemia) are difficult to address. As genetic tests for such conditions become cheaper, and as detailed haplotype maps and SNP databases become available, identifiers of race should diminish. Also, increasing interracial marriage is reducing the predictive power of race. For example, babies born with Tay–Sachs disease in North America are not only or primarily Ashkenazi Jews, despite stereotypes to the contrary; French Canadians, Louisiana Cajuns, and Irish-Americans also see high rates of the disease.

Michael Brooks, the author of "The Race Delusion", suggests that race is not determined biologically or genetically, but that it is socially constructed. He explains that nearly all scientists in the field of race, nationality, and ethnicity will confirm that race is a social construct. It has more to do with how people identify rather than genetics. He then goes on to explain how “black” and “white” have different meanings in other cultures. People in the United States tend to label themselves black if they have ancestors from Africa, whereas in Brazil a person with European ancestry may not be considered black. DNA shows that the human population is a result of populations that have moved across the world, splitting up and interbreeding. Even with this science to back up this concept, society has yet to believe and accept it. No one is born with the knowledge of race, the split between races and the decision to treat others differently based on skin color is completely learned and accepted by society.

Experts in the fields of genetics, law, and sociology have offered their opinions on the subject. Audrey Smedley and Brian D. Smedley of Virginia Commonwealth University Institute of Medicine discuss the anthropological and historical perspectives on ethnicity, culture, and race. They define culture as the habits acquired by a society. Smedley states "Ethnicity and culture are related phenomena and bear no intrinsic connection to human biological variations or race" (Smedley 17). The authors state using physical characteristics to define an ethnic identity is inaccurate. The variation of humans has actually decreased over time since, as the author states, "Immigration, intermating, intermarriage, and reproduction have led to increasing physical heterogeneity of peoples in many areas of the world" (Smedley 18). They referred to other experts and their research, pointing out that humans are 99% alike. That one percent is caused by natural genetic variation, and has nothing to do with the ethnic group of the subject. Racial classification in the United States started in the 1700s with three ethnically distinct groups. These groups were the white Europeans, Native Americans, and Africans. The concept of race was skewed around these times because of the social implications of belonging to one group or another. The view that one race is biologically different from another rose out of society's grasp for power and authority over other ethnic groups. This did not only happen in the United States but around the world as well. Society created race to create hierarchies in which the majority would prosper most.

Another group of experts in sociology has written on this topic. Guang Guo, Yilan Fu, Yi Li, Kathleen Mullan Harris of the University of North Carolina department of sociology as well as Hedwig Lee (University of Washington Seattle), Tianji Cai (University of Macau) comment on remarks made by one expert. The debate is over DNA differences, or lack thereof, between different races. The research in the original article they are referring to uses different methods of DNA testing between distinct ethnic groups and compares them to other groups. Small differences were found, but those were not based on race. They were from biological differences caused from the region in which the people live. They describe that the small differences cannot be fully explained because the understanding of migration, intermarriage, and ancestry is unreliable at the individual level. Race cannot be related to ancestry based on the research on which they are commenting. They conclude that the idea of "races as biologically distinct peoples with differential abilities and behaviors has long been discredited by the scientific community" (2338).

One more expert in the field has given her opinion. Ann Morning of the New York University Department of Sociology, and member of the American Sociological Association, discusses the role of biology in the social construction of race. She examines the relationship between genes and race and the social construction of social race clusters. Morning states that everyone is assigned to a racial group because of their physical characteristics. She identifies through her research the existence of DNA population clusters. She states that society would want to characterize these clusters as races. Society characterizes race as a set of physical characteristics. The clusters though have an overlap in physical characteristics and thus cannot be counted as a race by society or by science. Morning concludes that "Not only can constructivist theory accommodate or explain the occasional alignment of social classifications and genetic estimates that Shiao et al.'s model hypothesizes, but empirical research on human genetics is far from claiming—let alone demonstrating—that statistically inferred clusters are the equivalent of races" (Morning 203). Only using ethnic groups to map a genome is entirely inaccurate, instead every individual must be viewed as having their own wholly unique genome (unique in the 1%, not the 99% all humans share).

Ian Haney López, the John H. Boalt Professor of Law at the University of California, Berkeley explains ways race is a social construct. He uses examples from history of how race was socially constructed and interpreted. One such example was of the Hudgins v. Wright case. A slave woman sued for her freedom and the freedom of her two children on the basis that her grandmother was Native American. The race of the Wright had to be socially proven, and neither side could present enough evidence. Since the slave owner Hudgins bore the burden of proof, Wright and her children gained their freedom. López uses this example to show the power of race in society. Human fate, he argues, still depends upon ancestry and appearance. Race is a powerful force in everyday life. These races are not determined by biology though, they are created by society to keep power with the majority. He describes that there are not any genetic characteristics that all blacks have that non-whites do not possess and vice versa. He uses the example of Mexican. It truly is a nationality, yet it has become a catch-all for all Hispanic nationalities. This simplification is wrong, López argues, for it is not only inaccurate but it tends to treat all "Mexicans" as below fervent Americans. He describes that "More recently, genetic testing has made it clear the close connections all humans share, as well as the futility of explaining those differences that do exist in terms of racially relevant gene codes" (Lopez 199–200). Those differences clearly have no basis in ethnicity, so race is completely socially constructed.

Some argue it is preferable when considering biological relations to think in terms of populations, and when considering cultural relations to think in terms of ethnicity, rather than of race.

These developments had important consequences. For example, some scientists developed the notion of "population" to take the place of race. It is argued that this substitution is not simply a matter of exchanging one word for another.

This view does not deny that there are physical differences among peoples; it simply claims that the historical conceptions of "race" are not particularly useful in accounting for these differences scientifically. In particular, it is claimed that:

1. knowing someone's "race" does not provide comprehensive predictive information about biological characteristics, and only absolutely predicts those traits that have been selected to define the racial categories, e.g. knowing a person's skin color, which is generally acknowledged to be one of the markers of race (or taken as a defining characteristic of race), does not allow good predictions of a person's blood type to be made.
2. in general, the worldwide distribution of human phenotypes exhibits gradual trends of difference across geographic zones, not the categorical differences of race; in particular, there are many peoples (like the San of S. W. Africa, or the people of northern India) who have phenotypes that do not neatly fit into the standard race categories.
3. focusing on race has historically led not only to seemingly insoluble disputes about classification (e.g. are the Japanese a distinct race, a mixture of races, or part of the East Asian race? and what about the Ainu?) but has also exposed disagreement about the criteria for making decisions—the selection of phenotypic traits seemed arbitrary.

Neven Sesardic has argued that such arguments are unsupported by empirical evidence and politically motivated. Arguing that races are not completely discrete biologically is a straw man argument. He argues "racial recognition is not actually based on a single trait (like skin color) but rather on a number of characteristics that are to a certain extent concordant and that jointly make the classification not only possible but fairly reliable as well". Forensic anthropologists can classify a person's race with an accuracy close to 100% using only skeletal remains if they take into consideration several characteristics at the same time. A.W.F. Edwards has argued similarly regarding genetic differences in "Human genetic diversity: Lewontin's fallacy".

=== Race in biomedicine ===
There is an active debate among biomedical researchers about the meaning and importance of race in their research. The primary impetus for considering race in biomedical research is the possibility of improving the prevention and treatment of diseases by predicting hard-to-ascertain factors on the basis of more easily ascertained characteristics. The most well-known examples of genetically determined disorders that vary in incidence between ethnic groups would be sickle cell disease and thalassemia among black and Mediterranean populations respectively and Tay–Sachs disease among people of Ashkenazi Jewish descent. Some fear that the use of racial labels in biomedical research runs the risk of unintentionally exacerbating health disparities, so they suggest alternatives to the use of racial taxonomies.

== Case studies in the social construction of race ==
=== Race in the United States ===
In the United States since its early history, Native Americans, African-Americans and European-Americans were classified as belonging to different races. For nearly three centuries, the criteria for membership in these groups were similar, comprising a person's appearance, his fraction of known non-White ancestry, and his social circle. But the criteria for membership in these races diverged in the late 19th century. During Reconstruction, increasing numbers of Americans began to consider anyone with "one drop" of "Black blood" to be Black. By the early 20th century, this notion of invisible blackness was made statutory in many states and widely adopted nationwide. In contrast, Amerindians continue to be defined by a certain percentage of "Indian blood" (called blood quantum) due in large part to American slavery ethics.

==== Race definitions in the United States ====
The concept of race as used by the Census Bureau reflects self-identification by people according to the race or races with which they most closely identify. These categories are sociopolitical constructs and should not be interpreted as being scientific or anthropological in nature. They change from one census to another, and the racial categories include both racial and national-origin groups.

=== Race in Brazil ===
Compared to 19th-century United States, 20th-century Brazil was characterized by a relative absence of sharply defined racial groups. This pattern reflects a different history and different social relations. Basically, race in Brazil was recognized as the difference between ancestry (which determines genotype) and phenotypic differences. Racial identity was not governed by a rigid descent rule. A Brazilian child was never automatically identified with the racial type of one or both parents, nor were there only two categories to choose from. Over a dozen racial categories are recognized in conformity with the combinations of hair color, hair texture, eye color, and skin color. These types grade into each other like the colors of the spectrum, and no one category stands significantly isolated from the rest. That is, race referred to appearance, not heredity.

Through this system of racial identification, parents and children and even brothers and sisters were frequently accepted as representatives of opposite racial types. In a fishing village in the state of Bahia, an investigator showed 100 people pictures of three sisters and they were asked to identify the races of each. In only six responses were the sisters identified by the same racial term. Fourteen responses used a different term for each sister. In another experiment nine portraits were shown to a hundred people. Forty different racial types were elicited. It was found, in addition, that a given Brazilian might be called by as many as thirteen different terms by other members of the community. These terms are spread out across practically the entire spectrum of theoretical racial types. A further consequence of the absence of a descent rule was that Brazilians apparently not only disagreed about the racial identity of specific individuals, but they also seemed to be in disagreement about the abstract meaning of the racial terms as defined by words and phrases. For example, 40% of a sample ranked moreno claro as a lighter type than mulato claro, while 60% reversed this order. A further note of confusion is that one person might employ different racial terms to describe the same person over a short time span. The choice of which racial description to use may vary according to both the personal relationships and moods of the individuals involved. The Brazilian census lists one's race according to the preference of the person being interviewed. As a consequence, hundreds of races appeared in the census results, ranging from blue (which is blacker than the usual black) to pink (which is whiter than the usual white).

However, Brazilians are not so naïve as to ignore one's racial origins just because of his (or her) better social status. An interesting example of this phenomenon has occurred recently, when the famous football (soccer) player Ronaldo declared publicly that he considered himself as White, thus linking racism to a form or another of class conflict. This caused a series of ironic notes on newspapers, which pointed out that he should have been proud of his African origin (which is obviously noticeable), a fact that must have made life for him (and for his ancestors) more difficult, so, being a successful personality was, in spite of that, a victory for him. What occurs in Brazil that differentiates it largely from the US or South Africa, for example, is that black or mixed-race people are, in fact, more accepted in social circles if they have more education, or have a successful life (a euphemism for "having a better salary"). As a consequence, inter-racial marriages are more common, and more accepted, among highly educated Afro-Brazilians than lower-educated ones.

So, although the identification of a person by race is far more fluid and flexible in Brazil than in the U.S., there still are racial stereotypes and prejudices. African features have been considered less desirable; Blacks have been considered socially inferior, and Whites superior. These white supremacist values were a legacy of European colonization and the slave-based plantation system. The complexity of racial classifications in Brazil is reflective of the extent of miscegenation in Brazilian society, which remains highly, but not strictly, stratified along color lines. Henceforth, Brazil's desired image as a perfect "post-racist" country, composed of the "cosmic race" celebrated in 1925 by José Vasconcelos, must be met with caution, as sociologist Gilberto Freyre demonstrated in 1933 in Casa Grande e Senzala.

=== Race in politics and ethics ===
Michel Foucault argued the popular historical and political use of a non-essentialist notion of "race" used in the "race struggle" discourse during the 1688 Glorious Revolution and under Louis XIV's end of reign. In Foucault's view, this discourse developed in two different directions: Marxism, which seized the notion and transformed it into "class struggle" discourse, and racists, biologists and eugenicists, who paved the way for 20th century "state racism".

During the Enlightenment, racial classifications were used to justify enslavement of those deemed to be of "inferior", non-White races, and thus supposedly best fitted for lives of toil under White supervision. These classifications made the distance between races seem nearly as broad as that between species, easing unsettling questions about the appropriateness of such treatment of humans. The practice was at the time generally accepted by both scientific and lay communities.

Arthur Gobineau's An Essay on the Inequality of the Human Races (1853–1855) was one of the milestones in the new racist discourse, along with Vacher de Lapouge's "anthroposociology" and Johann Gottfried Herder (1744–1803), who applied race to nationalist theory to develop militant ethnic nationalism. They posited the historical existence of national races such as German and French, branching from basal races supposed to have existed for millennia, such as the Aryan race, and believed political boundaries should mirror these supposed racial ones.

Later, one of Hitler's favorite sayings was, "Politics is applied biology". Hitler's ideas of racial purity led to unprecedented atrocities in Europe. Since then, ethnic cleansing has occurred in Cambodia, the Balkans, Sudan, and Rwanda. In one sense, ethnic cleansing is another name for the tribal warfare and mass murder that has afflicted human society for ages.

Racial inequality has been a concern of United States politicians and legislators since the country's founding. In the 19th century most White Americans (including abolitionists) explained racial inequality as an inevitable consequence of biological differences. Since the mid-20th century, political and civic leaders as well as scientists have debated to what extent racial inequality is cultural in origin. Some argue that current inequalities between Blacks and Whites are primarily cultural and historical, the result of past and present racism, slavery and segregation, and could be redressed through such programs as affirmative action and Head Start. Others work to reduce tax funding of remedial programs for minorities. They have based their advocacy on aptitude test data that, according to them, shows that racial ability differences are biological in origin and cannot be leveled even by intensive educational efforts. In electoral politics, many more ethnic minorities have won important offices in Western nations than in earlier times, although the highest offices tend to remain in the hands of Whites.

In his famous Letter from Birmingham Jail, Martin Luther King Jr. observed:

History is the long and tragic story of the fact that privileged groups seldom give up their privileges voluntarily. Individuals may see the moral light and voluntarily give up their unjust posture; but as Reinhold Niebuhr has reminded us, groups are more immoral than individuals.

King's hope, expressed in his I Have a Dream speech, was that the civil rights struggle would one day produce a society where people were not "judged by the color of their skin, but by the content of their character".

Because of the identification of the concept of race with political oppression, many natural and social scientists today are wary of using the word "race" to refer to human variation, but instead use less emotive words such as "population" and "ethnicity". Some, however, argue that the concept of race, whatever the term used, is nevertheless of continuing utility and validity in scientific research.

== Race in law enforcement ==
In an attempt to provide general descriptions that may facilitate the job of law enforcement officers seeking to apprehend suspects, the United States FBI employs the term "race" to summarize the general appearance (skin color, hair texture, eye shape, and other such easily noticed characteristics) of individuals whom they are attempting to apprehend. From the perspective of law enforcement officers, a description needs to capture the features that stand out most clearly in the perception within the given society.

Thus, in the UK, Scotland Yard use a classification based on the ethnic composition of British society: W1 (White British), W2 (White Irish), W9 (Other White); M1 (White and black Caribbean), M2 (White and black African), M3 (White and Asian), M9 (Any other mixed background); A1 (Asian-Indian), A2 (Asian-Pakistani), A3 (Asian-Bangladeshi), A9 (Any other Asian background); B1 (Black Caribbean), B2 (Black African), B3 (Any other black background); O1 (Chinese), O9 (Any other).

In the United States, the practice of racial profiling has been ruled to be both unconstitutional and also to constitute a violation of civil rights. There is also an ongoing debate on the relationship between race and crime regarding the disproportional representation of certain minorities in all stages of the criminal justice system.

Several studies have documented racial disparities in policing. An analysis published in 2020 of 95 million traffic stops made between 2011 and 2018 found that it was more common for black people to be pulled over and searched after a stop than whites even though white people were more likely to be found with illicit drugs. Another study found that in Travis County, Texas, despite black people comprising only around 9 percent of the population, they made up about 30 percent of police arrests for possessing less than a gram of illicit drugs, even though surveys consistently show that black and white people use illicit drugs at the same rate. Despite statistics and data that show that black people do not actually possess drugs more than white people, they are still targeted more by the police than white people, which is largely due to the social construction of race.

Studies in racial taxonomy based on DNA cluster analysis have led law enforcement to pursue suspects based on their racial classification as derived from their DNA evidence left at the crime scene. DNA analysis has been successful in helping police determine the race of both victims and perpetrators. This classification is called "biogeographical ancestry".

== See also ==
- Acculturation
- Colonial mentality
- Colonialism
- Colorism
- Creolization
- Cultural assimilation
- Cultural cringe
- Cultural identity
- Enculturation
- Ethnocide
- Globalization
- Intercultural competence
- Language shift
- Paper Bag Party
- Passing (racial identity)
- Race and the war on drugs
- Race of the future
- Racialism
- Racialization
- Self-fulfilling prophecy
- Syncretism
- Westernization

== Other references ==
- Bernstein, David E. (2022) Classified: The untold story of racial classification in America. Bombardier Books, NY.
- Collins-Schramm, HE; et al. (2004). "Mexican American ancestry-informative markers: examination of population structure and marker characteristics in European Americans, Mexican Americans, Amerindians and Asian". Human Genetics. 114 (3): 263–71. doi:10.1007/s00439-003-1058-6. PMID 14628215. S2CID 12878410.
- Condit, CM; Parrott, R; Harris, TM (2002). "Lay understandings of the relationship between race and genetics: development of a collectivized knowledge through shared discourse". Public Understanding of Science. 11 (4): 373–387. doi:10.1088/0963-6625/11/4/305. S2CID 5482225.
- Cornell S, Hartmann D (1998) Ethnicity and race: making identities in a changing world. Pine Forge Press, Thousand Oaks, CA
- Dikötter F (1992) The discourse of race in modern China. Stanford University Press, Stanford
- Elliott, C; Brodwin, P (2002). "Identity and genetic ancestry tracing". BMJ. 325 (7378): 1469–1471. doi:10.1136/bmj.325.7378.1469. PMC 139044. PMID 12493671.
- Goldenberg DM (2003) The curse of ham: race and slavery in early Judaism, Christianity, and Islam. Princeton University Press, Princeton
- Huxley J, Haddon AC (1936) We Europeans: a survey of racial problems. Harper, New York
- Isaac B (2004) The invention of racism in classical antiquity. Princeton University Press, Princeton
- “We Are Repeating The Discrimination Experiment Every Day, Says Educator Jane Elliott”. 8 July 2020. Retrieved 29 November 2020.
