= Patricia Locke =

Native American educator and activist (1928–2001)

Patricia Ann Locke
- Born: Patricia Ann McGillis; January 21, 1928; Fort Hall Indian Reservation, Idaho
- Died: October 20, 2001 (aged 73)
- Other name: Tawacin WasteWin (Compassionate Woman)
- Citizenship: American, Lakota, and Chippewa
- Education: University of California, Los Angeles
- Occupations: Educator and Leader for Native American Religion
- Children: Kevin Locke and Winona Flying Earth

Patricia A. Locke (Tȟawáčhiŋ Wašté Wíŋ; January 21, 1928 – October 20, 2001) was a Native American educator, activist, and prominent member of the Baháʼí Faith. She worked closely with indigenous activists in supporting the American Indian Religious Freedom Act. After joining the Baháʼí Faith in 1988, she was elected as the first Native American woman to serve on the National Spiritual Assembly of the Baháʼís of the United States.

In 1991 she was a MacArthur Fellow, represented the US National Baháʼí community in Beijing at the Fourth World Conference on Women, and she was honored with the Indigenous Language Institute's Those Who Make a Difference award in 2001 just before her death. Posthumously she was inducted into the National Women's Hall of Fame in 2006, and in 2014 was a National Race Amity Conference honoree of a Race Amity Medal of Honor and the Google Cultural Institute included her in its listing Showcasing Great Women. Her son was a renowned hoop dancer, flute player, and storyteller Kevin Locke.

== Biography ==
=== Early life ===
Registered as Patricia Ann McGillis, daughter of John and Eva (Flying Earth) McGillis was born January 21, 1928, Locke was raised on the Fort Hall Indian Reservation in present-day Idaho as a Standing Rock Sioux, Hunkpapa band of Dakota descent, and Mississippi Band of White Earth Chippewa. Her father, of Scottish and Ojibway descent, worked for the Bureau of Indian Affairs and enlisted during World War I after appealing enlistment rejection because at the time Indians weren't considered citizens eligible for service. Her Lakota name Tȟawáčhiŋ Wašté Wíŋ means "She has a good consciousness, a compassionate woman."

In 1935, Locke participated in a demonstration of Lakota culture in dance and story telling at a local junior high school with her father and mother. Locke graduated from the University of California, Los Angeles in 1951. She was married to Charles E. Locke from 1952 to 1975; their son is Kevin Locke and daughter Winona Flying Earth. She taught at University of California, Los Angeles, San Francisco State University, Alaska Methodist University, the University of Colorado, and the University of Southern Maine, to name a few. In 1969 she offered an oral history which is held at the Library of Congress. In 1970 she spoke out that Indians need to be the priority in solving social problems among Indians. Patricia Locke believed that there is a fundamental difference in values between Native Americans and Western society, and that Native Americans should have the autonomy to solve issues among themselves. She saw to it her son Kevin was taught his heritage and sent him to the Institute of American Indian Arts for high school. Kevin Locke would go on to become a renowned storyteller, flute player, and hoop dancer who founded the Patricia Locke Foundation in honor of his mother.

=== Indigenous Activism ===
In 1975 she was the keynote speaker to the Native American Teacher Training Program with a topic "Competency-Based Native American Education". She spoke out against federal government regulations affecting Indian governments in 1978, supporting the American Indian Religious Freedom Act, and was appointed to the Interior Department Task Force on Indian Education Policy in 1979. Over time she also helped 17 tribes to establish Indian colleges.

Patricia Locke spoke out against federal government regulations affecting Indian governments in 1978, supporting the American Indian Religious Freedom Act, which led to the establishment of religious freedom for indigenous groups that had previously been stripped away. Soon after, Patricia Locke was appointed to the Interior Department Task Force on Indian Education Policy in 1979. Patricia Locke also played an instrumental role in the establishment of 17 different Indian colleges led and organized exclusively by indigenous groups in North America. She assisted in the passing of the Tribally Controlled Community College Assistance Act of 1978, which guaranteed federal aid to tribally run community colleges as long as a majority of their student body and board committee were indigenous. These colleges provided access to college education for indigenous people who wanted to stay connected with their people and culture. The Tribally Controlled Community College Assistance Act of 1978 also provided permits for the construction of future community colleges which would be run by exclusively Native groups.

Patricia Locke was a strong supporter of the revisions to the American Indian Religious Freedom Act in 1994, which was passed by Bill Clinton. These revisions looked at the shortcomings of the American Indian Religious Freedom Act and how to remedy those shortcomings. Peyote, which is often used in indigenous ritual practices, was considered a Schedule One Drug, meaning those in possession of peyote were in violation of the law. This 1994 amendment ensured that peyote could be used for proper religious ritual purposes.

=== Baháʼí Faith ===
In August 1988 she joined her son on the Trail of Light expedition of Native American Baháʼís traveling to South America. Locke's trip, which lasted from August 13 to September 5 involved meeting with and spreading ideas and Baháʼí teachings in South America. Soon she lived on the Standing Rock Reservation and was a Baháʼí for the last 10 years of her life. During her time at Standing Rock she contributed a series of articles to a local newspaper describing Lakota life, ideals, and instances of feeling injustice the editor hoped would build bridges of understanding with the area's non-indigenous population. In 1989 Locke interviewed Jacqueline Left Hand Bull for the newspaper about her view of the relationship of the Baháʼí Faith and Lakota belief especially in regards to the White Buffalo Woman - "When she said she'd return, it was a promise. Some of us believe that the promise has been fulfilled." and Locke was particularly struck that, in Baháʼu'lláh's foundational experience, there was a vision of "a woman ... dressed in white". She was the first Native Indian woman to serve on the National Spiritual Assembly of the Baháʼís of the United States and, up to her time, held the highest office of any Indian to serve. The same year she also co-authored a paper "The Effects of Testing on Native Americans" for the National Commission on Testing and Public Policy.

During that 1993 Parliament of Religions she was among those who, as part of the Native delegation and speaking as a Baháʼí delegate along with then Continental Counsellor Jacqueline Left Hand Bull, attempted to have a resolution adopted by the Parliament named "American Indian Declaration of Vision 1993" which said in part:

One hundred years ago, during the 1893 Parliament of World Religions, the profoundly religious Original Peoples of the Western Hemisphere were not invited. We are still here and still struggling to be heard for the sake of our Mother Earth and our children. Our spiritual and physical survival continues to be threatened all over the hemisphere, we feel compelled to ask you to join us in restoring the balances of humanity and Mother Earth in these ways:

1. Acknowledgement of the myriad of messengers of the Creator, the Great Mystery, to the peoples of the Western Hemisphere.
2. Support in promoting, preserving and maintaining our Indigenous languages and cultures.

The resolution was initially adopted by a near-unanimous vote by the delegates yet was ultimately nullified by Dr. David Ramage Jr., the Chair of the Council Parliament at that time, who overruled the vote because of a conflict over the Inter caetera Bull and the basic roll of the Parliament to discuss rather than take action. The main issue indigenous groups had with the Inter caetera Bull was that it advocated for Christian subjugation of Native peoples and their land. While the 1993 Parliament of Religions showed increased religious and cultural diversity compared to the previous conference in 1893, the representation of religions was still male-dominated, and a refusal to denounce the Inter caetera Bull upset many of the indigenous attendees.

In 1994 she returned in support of the American Indian Religious Freedom Act in its later revision. In 1995 Locke served as chair of the Indigenous Women's Caucus at Fourth World Conference on Women, and represented the US National Baháʼí community, in Beijing. In earlier 2001 she was invited to deliver a lecture at the University of Maryland - hers was entitled "Indigenous Women's Perspectives on Unity".

Locke died while in Phoenix, Arizona, on October 20, 2001, of heart-failure and was buried in nearby Paradise Valley, Arizona. Her grandson, Anpao Duta Flying Earth, continues her work in indigenous language revitalization efforts and service to the community of Native Americans. Since 2016, Anpao Duta Flying Earth has served as the Head of School at the Native American Community Academy (NACA) located in New Mexico. In 2019, he became the acting director of NACA.

== Awards ==
In 1991, Patricia Locke received the MacArthur Genius Grant for her work in the preservation of Native American languages. At the time Locke received this award, she was the only indigenous woman of North America to ever receive this honor. Artist Hollis Sigler collaborated with Patricia Locke from 1998 to 1999 to create a piece titled 20 Years of Joy. On October 13, 2001, just one week before Patricia Locke died, she and her son Kevin Locke received the "Those Who Make a Difference" award presented by the Indigenous Language Institute (ILI). Kevin Locke was recognized as an accomplished storyteller and hoop dancer who worked to preserve the Lakota tradition alongside his mother.

After Patricia Locke's death, in 2005, she was inducted into the Nation Women's Hall of Fame. The award recognized her work as an educator and Lakota language expert, as well as her work in the creation of numerous colleges that were run entirely by Lakota tribes. The National Women's Hall of Fame also highlighted her accomplishments working on committees such as the World Assembly of First Nations in 1982 and the Indigenous Women's Caucus in 1985.

In 2014, the National Race Amity Conference honored Patricia Locke with the Medal of Honor. Before this award, Locke had been a National Race Amity Conference honoree, but it was not until her death that she received the Medal of Honor.

Jacqueline Left Hand Bull said of her: "... Tawacin Wastewin chose to follow a life path of service to her people, who at first were American Indians, grew to include all indigenous people, and by the end of her remarkable life, had grown to include all of her human family. ... In both personal matters and through interaction with the world around her, she began to tread a path that insisted upon justice. To obtain justice, she understood that power was needed, and soon it became clear that true power is spiritual, not material. ..."

In 2011 John Kolstoe published a biography Compassionate Woman: The Life and Legacy of Patricia Locke. His book shows both the professional accomplishments of Locke as well as her personal connections to her family.

== The Patricia Locke Foundation ==
In 2018, Kevin Locke created the Patricia Locke Foundation, which aims to educate indigenous peoples and children in the importance of their ancestral languages and spiritual connections. The Patricia Locke Foundation also works to support business led by Native Women, as well as provide legal support for indigenous peoples when necessary. This organization seeks to invest in younger generations who they believe will shape the future and pass on indigenous traditions to future generations.

== See also ==
- Baháʼí Faith and Native Americans
- Baháʼí Faith and gender equality
