= Baháʼí Faith and gender equality =

Religion

One of the fundamental teachings of the Baháʼí Faith is that men and women are equal and that equality of the sexes is a spiritual and moral standard essential for the unification of the planet and a prerequisite for peace. Baháʼí teachings stress the importance of implementing this principle in individual, family, and community life. Nevertheless, the Baháʼí notion of the full spiritual and social equality of the two sexes does not imply sameness, so that gender distinction and differentiation are observed in certain areas of life. Significantly, while women can and do serve in an extensive range of elected and appointed positions within the Baháʼí administration at both national and international levels, they are not permitted to serve as members of the Universal House of Justice, the supreme governing institution of the Baháʼí Faith.

== Equality ==
The equality of men and women is a fundamental Baháʼí principle, that is explicit in the writings of Baháʼu'lláh, the founder of the Baháʼí Faith, and particularly in the writings and discourses of ʻAbdu'l-Bahá, his son and chosen interpreter. The teaching and its vision of the community is central to Baháʼí community life as is implemented at a practical level. The Baháʼí teachings state that women are not inferior to men, and should not be subordinate to men in aspects of social life. In fact, the education of daughters is held to be more important than, and therefore to take precedence over, that of sons. In the Baháʼí view, women have always been equal to men, and the reason why women have so far not achieved this equality is due to the lack of adequate educational and social opportunities, and because men have used their greater physical strength to prevent women from developing their true potential.

=== Spiritual station ===
Baháʼu'lláh noted that there was no distinction in the spiritual stations of men and women, and that women and men were equal in the sight of God. Baháʼu'lláh wrote:

Exalted, immensely exalted is He Who hath removed differences and established harmony...[T]he Pen of the Most High hath lifted distinctions from between His servants and handmaidens and ... hath conferred upon all a station and rank on the same plane.

Instead of their gender, Baháʼu'lláh wrote that the spiritual station of each person depends on their recognition and devotion to God. ʻAbdu'l-Bahá stated that God did not differentiate between people based on gender and that all were made in the image of God. He further stated that both women and men have the same potential for intelligence, virtue and prowess.

=== Advancement of humanity and prerequisite to peace ===
ʻAbdu'l-Bahá stated that gender equality was not simply righting historical social injustices against women, but would serve as a key factor in wide-ranging societal changes that would help develop a new civilization in which more 'feminine' qualities such as tender-heartedness and receptivity would balance previously dominant 'masculine' forces. The Baháʼí writings state that until women are provided equal status to men, humanity cannot advance or progress. ʻAbdu'l-Bahá in a series of analogies has compared men and women to the two wings of a bird and the two hands of a human body and stated that both need to be strong to allow for advancement. ʻAbdu'l-Baha wrote:

The world of humanity is possessed of two wings: the male and the female. So long as these two wings are not equivalent in strength, the bird will not fly. Until womankind reaches the same degree as man, until she enjoys the same arena of activity, extraordinary attainment for humanity will not be realized; humanity cannot wing its way to heights of real attainment. When the two wings or parts become equivalent in strength, enjoying the same prerogatives, the flight of man will be exceedingly lofty and extraordinary.

Both Baháʼu'lláh and ʻAbdu'l-Bahá wrote that an important aspect of world unity will be a greater balance between feminine and masculine influences on society, and stated that because of the greater feminine influence that wars will cease and a permanent peace attained. ʻAbdu'l-Bahá wrote that women, as mothers, would be a force in establishing peace as they would oppose sending their children to war. ʻAbdu'l-Bahá wrote:

War and its ravages have blighted the world; the education of woman will be a mighty step toward its abolition and ending, for she will use her whole influence against war. Woman rears the child and educates the youth to maturity. She will refuse to give her sons for sacrifice upon the field of battle. In truth, she will be the greatest factor in establishing universal peace and international arbitration. Assuredly, woman will abolish warfare among mankind.

Moojan Momen writes that the goal of achieving equality of women and men in the Baháʼí Faith does not amount to bringing women into power in masculine roles, but instead a more radical change to the very nature of society, to make feminine qualities more valued.

=== Education of women ===
In the Baháʼí view, women have always been equal to men, and the reason why women have not achieved this equality yet is because of the lack of adequate educational and social opportunities. Thus Baháʼí teachings stress the need for women's education, not only as a means to increase opportunity for women to help achieve equality, but also since the education of mothers is essential to the proper upbringing of children. Because of the importance of the education of women, the education of daughters takes precedence over that of sons when financial resources do not exist to educate all of the children of a family. Despite the linkage between motherhood and education, ʻAbdu'l-Bahá encouraged women to excel in arts and sciences, and stated that women's participation in the political sphere would be a prerequisite for peace.

== Dignity of women in the Baháʼí Faith ==
Over a century ago, Baháʼu'lláh, the founder of the Baháʼí Faith, proclaimed the equality of man and woman. He included it as an integral element of the social order he envisioned. He supported it by laws requiring the same standard of education for women as for men, and equality of rights in society. The Baha'i concept of the equality of women and men must be understood in the context of the pivotal principle of the Baha'i Faith—the oneness of humankind. It is a principle that addresses itself to relationships at all levels of society: relationships between individuals, within the family, within the community; relationships between individuals and their respective communities and social institutions; relationships between individuals and the natural environment; as well as relationships among nation states. The vision of the Baháʼí Faith is the creation of conditions—social, spiritual, and material—that enable the oneness of humanity to be expressed in the structure and relationships at all levels of society.

The following are two quotes from ʻAbdu'l-Bahá:

"Women have equal rights with men upon earth; in religion and society they are a very important element. As long as women are prevented from attaining their highest possibilities, so long will men be unable to achieve the greatness which might be theirs."

"The world of humanity has two wings—one is women and the other men. Not until both wings are equally developed can the bird fly. Should one wing remain weak, flight is impossible. Not until the world of women becomes equal to the world of men in the acquisition of virtues and perfections, can success and prosperity be attained as they ought to be."

== Historical women figures in Baháʼí history ==
There have been a large number of women heroines who are celebrated in the history of the Baháʼí Faith including Khadíjih-Bagum, Táhirih, Navváb, Queen Marie, Bahíyyih Khánum, Martha Root, Leonora Armstrong, Lidia Zamenhof, and many others.

=== Táhirih ===
Táhirih was an influential poet and follower of the Bábí faith, the predecessor to the Baháʼí Faith, and often mentioned in Baháʼí literature as an example of courage in the struggle for women's rights. She is often referred to as "the first woman suffrage martyr". Táhirih was the seventeenth disciple or "Letter of the Living" of the Báb. While the writings of Táhirih do not address the issue of women's rights precisely, Táhirih experienced the Báb's revelation as liberating, and broke with Islamic practices that were expected of women, such as appearing in public without a veil at the Conference of Badasht. Her actions which were out of norm caused controversy in the community and some saw her as scandalous or unchaste. To combat the attitudes of the community against Táhirih, the Báb gave her the title Táhirih, meaning the "pure." In mid-1852 she was executed in secret on account of her Bábí faith and her unveiling. An unverified quote has been attributed to Táhirih by ʻAbdu'l-Bahá about her final utterance in 1852: "You can kill me as soon as you like, but you cannot stop the emancipation of women." According to some scholars this quote is "perhaps apocryphal".

=== Bahíyyih Khánum ===
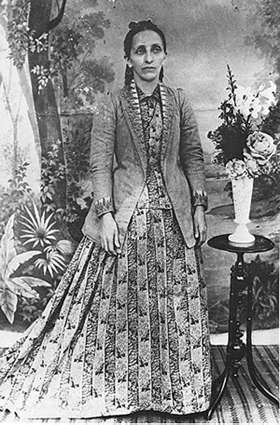
Bahíyyih Khánum in 1895

Bahíyyih Khánum was born in 1846 and was the eldest daughter of Baháʼu'lláh and Ásíyih Khánum. She was entitled the Greatest holy Leaf. She was particularly dear to her father and is seen within the Baháʼí Faith as one of the greatest women to have lived. During World War I, she distributed food, clothing and medical aid to the starving local population. During the periods her brother was away in America, and after his death when Shoghi Effendi was named the head of the religion, but away on retreats, Bahíyyih Khánum was empowered as the acting leader of the Baháʼí Faith, which was a rare position for a woman to be in at that time. She died on 15 July 1932 was buried in the Baháʼí gardens below the Baháʼí Arc on Mount Carmel; the Monument of the Greatest Holy Leaf was built in her memory at the Baháʼí World Centre.

== Serving in administration ==
In terms of Baháʼí administration, all positions except for membership on the Universal House of Justice are open to men and women. No specific reason has been given for this exception, but ʻAbdu'l-Bahá has stated that there is a wisdom for it, which would eventually become clear. The only other field where ʻAbdu'l-Baha did not extend full and equal participation to women was in military endeavors, since he regarded the taking of human life as incompatible with women's role as mothers.

There are two branches of Baháʼí administration: appointed and elected.

=== Appointed ===
==== Hands of the Cause ====
Hands of the Cause were a select group of Baháʼís, appointed for life, whose main function was to propagate and protect the Baháʼí Faith. Unlike the members of the elected institutions and other appointed institutions in the Baháʼí Faith who serve in those offices, these are considered to have demonstrated sincerity and praiseworthy morals and qualities and achieved a distinguished rank in service to the religion and an overall station above a National Spiritual Assembly as well as individual members of the Universal House of Justice – indeed it is the highest station that could be achieved open to anyone in the religion. The title is no longer given out. The work of the Hands of the Cause is now carried out by the Continental Counsellors and the Auxiliary Boards.

Eight out of the fifty known Hands of the Cause were women (in order of appointment):

- Keith Ransom-Kehler (1876–1933) (singled out as the first woman Hand of the Cause and first American martyr)
- Martha Root (1872–1939) (singled out as the foremost Hand of the Cause of the first Baháʼí century and the "first finest fruit" of the Formative Age.)
- Dorothy Beecher Baker (1898–1954)
- Amelia Engelder Collins (1873–1962)
- Clara Dunn (1869–1960)
- Corinne Knight True (1861–1961)
- Rúhíyyih Khánum (1910–2000)
- Agnes Baldwin Alexander (1875–1971)

During the period between the death of Shoghi Effendi and the election of the Universal House of Justice the Hands of the Cause held a convocation from which they constituted a body of nine from among their number to serve in the Holy Land and to act as Custodians of the Baháʼí Faith, a body which functioned without officers and with a quorum of five, whose duties included taking care of Baháʼí World Center properties and other assets; corresponding with and advising National and Regional Spiritual Assemblies; acting on behalf of the Baháʼí Faith for its protection; and maintaining close contact with the rest of the Hands, who would henceforth devote their time to the successful completion of the goals of the Ten Year Crusade. The Hands of the Cause maintained the number of Custodians, replacing those who died or were unable, for health or personal reasons, to remain at the Baháʼí World Center permanently. Of these nine, two women served as Custodians: Amelia Collins and Rúhíyyih Khánum.

==== International Baháʼí Council ====
The International Baháʼí Council was a nine-member council as a precursor to the Universal House of Justice, which replaced it in 1963. In March 1951 Shoghi Effendi began appointing its membership and in 1961 elections were held (and once elections were the rule, Hands of the Cause were exempted from being members.) The women members of the International Baháʼí Council, and their dates of their service were:

- Rúhíyyih Khanum (1951–1961) Liaison with Shoghi Effendi; Hand of the Cause of God
- Amelia Collins (1951–1961) Vice president; Hand of the Cause
- Jessie Revell (1951–1963) Treasurer
- Ethel Revell (1951–1963) Western Assistant Secretary
- Gladys Weeden (1951–52)
- Sylvia Ioas (1955–1961)
- Mildred Mottahedeh (1961–1963)

==== Continental Counsellors ====
After the election of the Universal House of Justice, boards of counsellors were created in 1973 by appointment who outrank the national assemblies, though individually counsellors ranked lower than that of the Hands of the Cause. There are 90 counsellors – 81 serving on continental boards and 9 serving at the International Teaching Center. From a picture of a gathering of all counsellors in 2005 a number of them are clearly women. The number of counsellors acting as members of the International Teaching Center have varied. Initially, excluding the Hands of the Cause (all of whom were initial members.) From 1980 to 2000 there were nine total counsellors and four of them were women. Since 2000 the number of women counsellors serving at the ITC has been five of the nine. Not counting the Hands of the Cause, the women and their years of service are:

- Florence Mayberry (1973–1983)
- Anneliese Bopp (1979–1988)
- Dr. Magdalene Carney (1983–1991)
- Isobel Sabri (1983–1992)
- Lauretta King (1988–2003)
- Joy Stevenson (1988–1998)
- Joan Lincoln (1993–2013)
- Kimiko Schwerin (1993–1998)
- Violette Haake (1998–2008)
- Dr. Penny Walker (1998–2013)
- Zenaida Ramirez (2000–2013)
- Rachel Ndegwa (2003– )
- Uransaikhan Granfar (2008–2018)
- Alison Milston (2013–2018)
- Edith Senoga (?)
- Antonella Demonte (2013– )
- Mehranguiz Farid Tehrani (2013– )
- Gloria Javid (2018– )
- Dr. Holly Woodard (2018– )

The percent of women serving as counselors rose from 24% of 63 counselors in 1980 to 48% of 81 counselors serving worldwide.

=== Elected ===
Women serve on National Assemblies. Baháʼí elections are secret ballots and electees are chosen without running for office on plurality up to the number of members of the institution. That women could be elected was in development by 1909 when the Baha'i temple unity executive board was elected in the United States. Of the nine members chosen, three were women, with Corinne True (later appointed as a Hand of the Cause) serving as an officer. The all-male administrative bodies were completely dissolved by ʻAbdu'l-Bahá in his visit to America in 1912. By 1925 the executive board evolved into the National Spiritual Assembly of the Baháʼís of the United States and Canada. There were specific developments in the eastern Baháʼí communities in 1951. At this time women were allowed to be and were elected according to the rules of Baháʼí administration to local assemblies of the Baháʼí Faith in Egypt (indeed some were elected officers in 1952.) However, as late as the 1970s one observer could only count two women delegates out of the more than one hundred attending the national Baha'i convention in Tehran. Yet when the members of the National Spiritual Assembly of the Baháʼís of Iran were arrested and executed in 1981, the chairperson was a woman, Zhinus Mahmudi. However a statistical review across continents and for the Baha'is world population shows a general upward track of women being elected to national assemblies (see graphs.) A similar pattern exists for women serving in appointed positions.

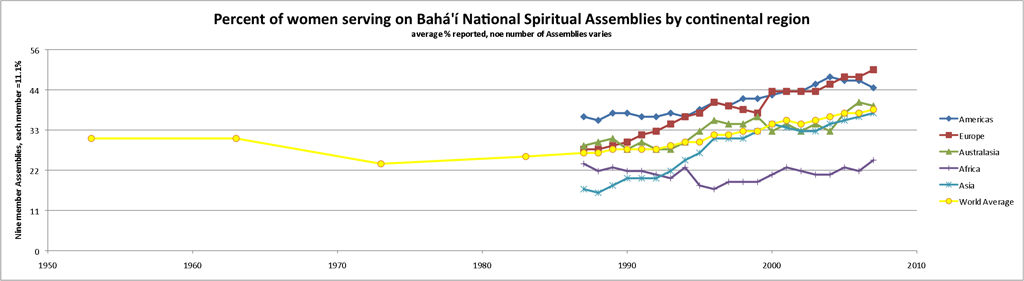
Percentage of Women serving on Baháʼí National Spiritual Assemblies by continental region Source: Baha'i World Centre (March 10, 2008). "Percentage of National Spiritual Assembly members who are women, 1953-2007". Statistics. Baháʼí Library Online..

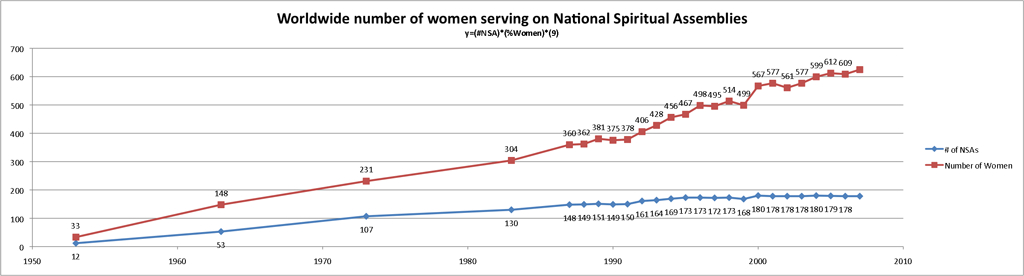
Percentage of Women serving on Baháʼí National Spiritual Assemblies by continental region Source: Baha'i World Centre (March 10, 2008). "Percentage of National Spiritual Assembly members who are women, 1953-2007". Statistics. Baháʼí Library Online..

The world average of women serving on National Assemblies had reached rates of 31% as early as 1953, been above 31% continuously since 1996, and reached 39% in 2007, the last date for which data is currently available.

== Social or professionally notable Baháʼí women ==
Some more recent socially or professionally notable women Baháʼís include:

- Dorothy Wright Nelson
- Helen Elsie Austin
- Jacqueline Left Hand Bull
- Layli Miller-Muro
- Mona Mahmudnizhad
- Patricia Locke
- Zhang Xin
- Zia Mody

== Social initiatives ==
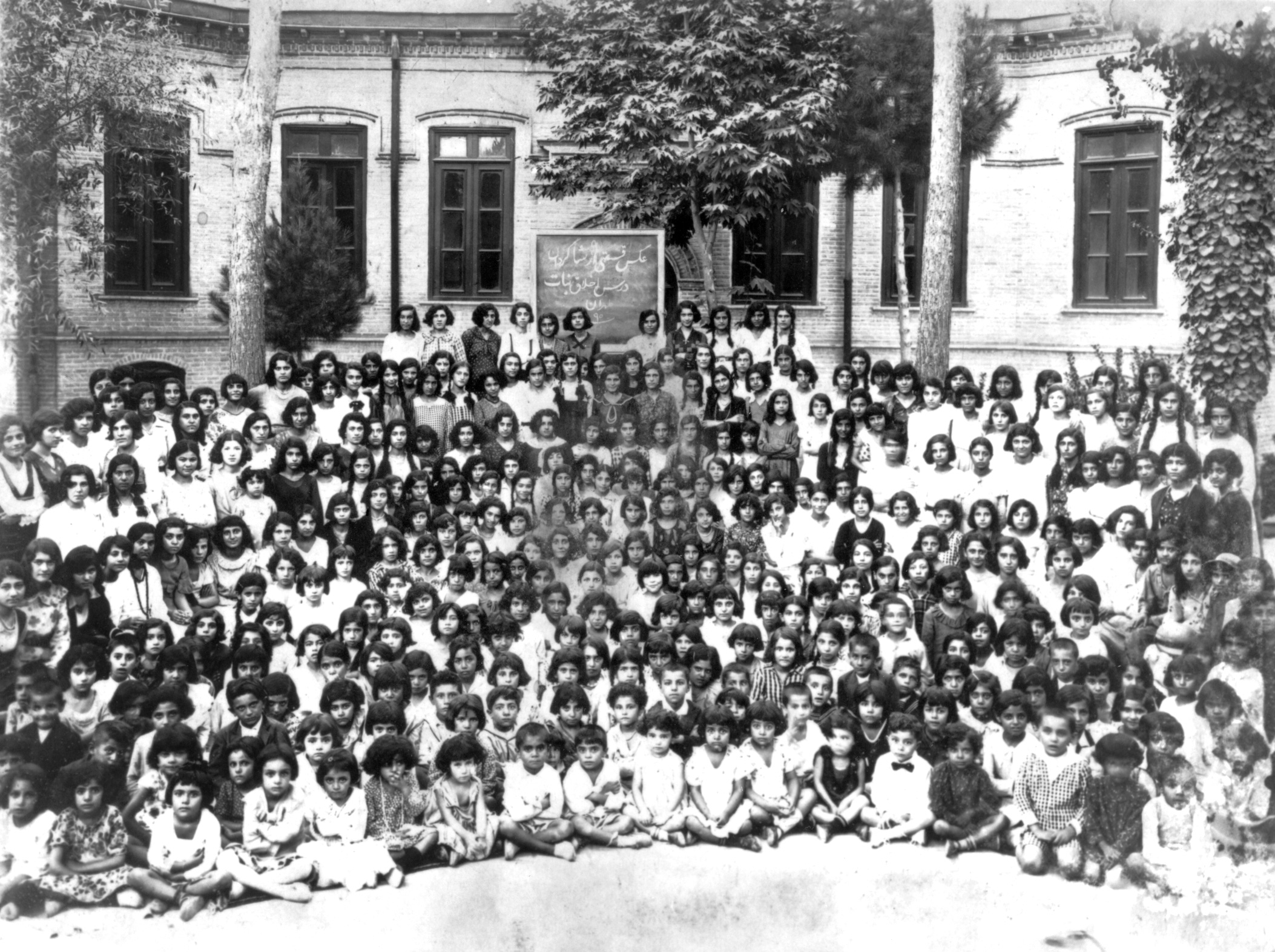
Students of School for Girls, Tehran, 13 August 1933. The school was closed by government decree in 1934. Source: History of Baháʼí Educational Efforts in Iran.

The Baháʼí Faith's emphasis is on the equality of women and men and thus the Baháʼí Faith actively promotes a number of programs with the aim of the advancement of women with greater access for women to health, education, child-care, and business opportunities. In the early 1900s Baháʼí women became active in seeking advancement and were encouraged by ʻAbdu'l-Baha and were thus able to gain a position of equality in Baháʼí administration. In Iran, education for girls was started by a Baháʼís leading to the eventual establishment in 1910 of the Tarbiyat School for Girls which helped train the first generation of Iranian professional women. By the 1970s, while the majority of Iranian women were illiterate, most Baháʼí women could read and write.

Since the International Women's Year in 1975, the Universal House of Justice, the governing body of the Baháʼís, has repeatedly called national Baháʼí communities to promote the equal participation of women in Baháʼí activities. In 1993, the Baháʼí International Community established the Office of the Advancement of Women in New York City at the United Nations, and various national communities have also created their own offices. Activities in these programmes include the promotion of girls' education, literacy, rural health care, and income-generating skills.

The Baháʼí-inspired Tahirih Justice Center and the Barli Vocational Institute for Rural Women in Indore in India are projects that have received particular attention. Layli Miller-Muro founded the Tahirih Justice Center in 1997 following a well-publicized asylum case in which she was involved as a student attorney. Miller-Muro later co-wrote a book with the client she had aided and used her portion of the proceeds for the initial funding of Tahirih. As of 2003, the organization had assisted more than 4,000 women and children fleeing from a wide variety of abuses. The Barli Vocational Institute for Rural Women was founded in 1985 in India and offers a six-month program for tribal women at its facilities in the Indian state of Madhya Pradesh. Through June 1996, a total of 769 rural tribal women have been trained at the institute; the women came from 119 villages, and after returning home to their cities or villages 45% of them established small businesses, 62% are functionally literate or semi-literate (which has motivated people to send their children to school), 42% have started growing vegetables, 97% are using safe drinking water, all the former trainees and many of their male relatives have given up drinking alcohol, and caste prejudices have been eliminated.

== Distinction ==
While the Baháʼí teachings assert the full spiritual and social equality of women to men, there are some aspects of gender distinctiveness or gender differentiation in certain areas of life. One of these aspects relates to the biological fact of potential motherhood for women, and thus the Baháʼí teaching that girls should be given priority in education as they potentially would be the children's first educator. In the same sense, the Baháʼí view of family life gives the right to the mother to be supported by the husband if needed. Similarly, the differences in the provisions of the Kitáb-i-Aqdas, Baháʼu'lláh's book of laws, where in the case of intestacy it provides slightly more inheritance to men than women, can be seen in the same light.

While most of the teachings and laws of the Baháʼí Faith between a man and a woman apply mutatis mutandis as between a woman and a man, there are some Baháʼí teachings or laws that provide preference to women or men. Menstruating women are exempt from practising the obligatory prayer and from fasting due to biological differences; these exemptions are not compulsory and do not reflect any concepts of ritual impurity. Women also do not have the obligation of making pilgrimage, although they can if they choose; men who are financially able to do so are obliged to make the pilgrimage. In terms of Baháʼí administration, all positions except for membership on the Universal House of Justice are open to men and women. No specific reason has been given for this exception, but ʻAbdu'l-Bahá has stated that there is a wisdom for it, which would eventually become clear.

ʻAbdu'l-Bahá implies that women will become equal in "sciences and arts, in virtues and perfections", and are actually superior in "tenderness of heart and the abundance of mercy and sympathy" – virtues identified as gaining ascendancy as the world becomes more permeated with feminine ideals to balance the masculine ideals that now dominate.
