= Young, Jewish, and Left =

- Directed by: Michael Konnie Chameides; Irit Reinheimer
- Produced by: Michael Konnie Chameides; Irit Reinheimer
- Edited by: Michael Konnie Chameides
- Music by: Mirah; Nomy Lamm; Divahn
- Release date: April 16, 2006
- Running time: 55 minutes
- Country: United States
- Language: English

Young, Jewish, and Left is an American documentary that presents several US-based leftist Jews grappling with identity, politics, and culture.

== Synopsis ==
Young, Jewish, and Left combines queer culture, Jewish-Arab history, secular Yiddishkeit, anti-racist analysis, and religious traditions into a multi-layered picture of the circa 2006 Jewish Left. Personal experiences from many of the era's leading Jewish activists frame Jewish identity in what it the official website says is "a fresh and constructive take on race, spirituality, Zionism, queerness, resistance, justice, and liberation."

Dan Berger, in Left Turn magazine, writes: "Young Jewish and Left provides a beautiful cross-section of today's visionary thinkers, activists, and artists. The film celebrates the profound legacy of resistance among Jews—and criticizes the reactionary elements in Jewish communities, from the occupation to assimilation, patriarchy and homophobia. And it calls the Left to task for generally lacking an understanding of Jewish history or culture.

Jennifer Bleyer, on Nextbook argues that it "... proves that the legacy of Jewish socialists, anarchists, feminists, Yippies, hippies, organizers, and agitators of the past century lives on..."

== People featured ==
The following people are featured in the documentary:

- Vicki Alcoset – Working class, mixed-race Jew
- Micah Bazant – Co-author of the Love & Justice in Times of War Haggadah
- Rabbi Haim Beliak – Co-director, Stop Moskowitz Campaign
- Jenine Bressner – Artist
- Lena Broderson – Hebrew school teacher
- Julia Caplan – Co-founder of Jewish Voice for Peace, San Francisco Bay Area
- Yonah Diamond – Union organizer
- Nava Etshalom – Writer and activist
- Harmony Goldberg – Educator, SOUL (School of Unity & Liberation)
- Miriam Grant – Former participant and staff, Jewish Youth for Community Action
- Shira Hassan – Social worker
- Haddasah Ladies for Homos
- Molly Hein – Media artist and Klezmer singer
- Julie Iny – Community organizer and historian of Arab Jewish Left
- Loolwa Khazoom – Editor, The Flying Camel: Essays on Identity by Women of North African and Middle Eastern Jewish Heritage
- Paul Kivel – Violence prevention educator
- Rabbi Michael Lerner – National chair, The Tikkun Community, and author
- And A. Lusia – Rabble rouser
- Josina Manu Maltzman – Feygelech for a Free Palestine
- Rachel Marcus – Student, Oberlin College, grew up going to Kinderland – Jewish socialist summer camp
- Emily Nepon – Co-creator of Suck My Treyf Gender, Bar Mitzvah-boy drag performer, author of [www.newjewishagenda.net NewJewishAgenda.net]
- Steve Quester – Early-childhood educator and queer Jewish activist
- Penny Rosenwasser – Jewish Voice for Peace, board member
- Jna Shelomith – Revolutionary
- Deb Shoval – Playwright, director of An Olive on the Seder Plate
- Dara Silverman – Director of Jews for Racial and Economic Justice
- Rabbi Arthur Waskow – Director of Shalom Center and author
- Liz Werner – Writer/translator/teacher, grandparents blacklisted in the McCarthy era

== Festivals and conferences ==
The film was featured at the following festivals and conferences:

- 2006 ARPA International Film Festival
- 2007 Pioneer Valley Jewish Film Festival
- 2007 Minneapolis Jewish Film Festival
- 2007 Not Quite Kosher Film Festival, San Diego State University Hillel
- 2007 Big Muddy Film Festival, University of Southern Illinois
- 2007 Jewdas Jewish Film Festival, London
- 2007 National Conference on Organized Resistance
- 2007 Practicing Jews: Art, Identity, and Culture Conference
- 2008 Maine Jewish Film Festival
