= Tahirih Justice Center =

American non-governmental organization

- Formation: 1997; 29 years ago
- Founder: Layli Miller-Muro
- Founded at: United States
- Type: Non-governmental organization
- Tax ID no.: 54-1858176
- Headquarters: Falls Church, Virginia, United States
- Products: Legal services, public policy advocacy.
- Services: Protecting human rights and refugee women
- Website: www.tahirih.org

The Tahirih Justice Center, or Tahirih, is a national charitable non-governmental organization headquartered in Falls Church, Virginia, United States, that aims to protect immigrant women and girls fleeing gender-based violence and persecution. Tahirih's holistic model combines free legal services and social services case management with public policy advocacy, training and education.

Since its founding in 1997, Tahirih has answered more than 30,000 pleas for help from individuals seeking protection from human rights abuses, such as female genital cutting, domestic violence, human trafficking, torture and rape.

Tahirih is inspired by principles of the Baháʼí Faith, including the belief that equality between women and men is necessary for peace and unity in society. The organization is named after Táhirih, an influential female poet and theologian in 19th-century Persia who campaigned for women's rights.

== History ==
=== Founding ===
Layli Miller-Muro founded the Tahirih Justice Center in 1997 following the Matter of Kasinga, a landmark asylum case in which Miller-Muro was involved as a law student.

At the age of 17, Fauziya Kassindja fled her origin country of Togo and sought asylum in the United States to escape a forced polygamous marriage and imminent female genital mutilation/cutting (FGM/C). She went through Ghana and Germany before arriving at Newark Liberty International Airport in New Jersey, where she immediately requested asylum. Kassindja was detained by the Immigration and Naturalization Service (INS) until 1996. Although an Immigration Judge initially found Kassindja "excludable as an intending immigrant, denied her applications for asylum and withholding of deportation, and ordered her excluded and deported from the United States" in 1995, Kassindja was unanimously granted asylum in June 1996 by the Board of Immigration Appeals, setting national precedent and establishing gender-based persecution as grounds for seeking asylum in the U.S. Following the case, Kassindja and Miller-Muro co-authored a memoir, published by Random House, titled Do They Hear You When You Cry (1998).

Spurred by the widespread media coverage of Kassindja's case, the United States Congress passed legislation to define female genital mutilation/cutting on a minor as a federal criminal offense, which went into effect on March 30, 1997.

After discovering that few organizations offered legal assistance to women seeking asylum or refugee status in the Washington, D.C. area, Miller-Muro founded the Tahirih Justice Center to build on the accomplishments of Matter of Kasinga and to provide free legal services to immigrant women and girls fleeing to the U.S. from gender-based violence. In 1998, Tahirih hired its first paid staff to represent women seeking asylum from gender-based persecution.

In 1999, Tahirih litigated the Matter of Adeniji, a precedent-setting decision that clarified that mandatory detention provisions contained in the Illegal Immigration Reform and Immigrant Responsibility Act of 1996 could not apply retroactively.

=== 2000–2005 ===
During this period, Tahirih launched its Public Policy Advocacy Program and began offering in-house social services case management to its clients.

In 2000, Tahirih advised the U.S. State Department in the conceptual development of legislation that became the Victims of Trafficking and Violence Protection Act, which established new visas for victims of trafficking (T visas) and victims of serious crimes (U visas). As a result, Tahirih began representing survivors of human trafficking and working closely with the Immigration and Naturalization Service (INS) to ensure compliance with the distribution of T and U and visas.

In 2001, Tahirih launched the Campaign to Prevent Abuse and Exploitation through the International Marriage Broker (IMB) Industry to address the abuse of so-called "mail-order brides". Alongside law firm Arnold & Porter Kaye Scholer, Tahirih successfully litigated Fox v. Encounters International in 2004, a case that marked the first time in the United States that an IMB had been held liable for negligent conduct that put a woman at serious risk in an abusive relationship and kept her in danger by misleading her as to her legal options.

Drafted by Tahirih, the International Marriage Broker Regulation Act of 2005 (IMBRA) was passed by Congress and signed into law by President George W. Bush as part of the reauthorized Violence Against Women Act. (Note: IMBRA can be found in Subtitle D (Sections 831-834) of Title VIII, Public Law 109-162 ("The Violence Against Women and Department of Justice Reauthorization Act of 2005"), and was subsequently codified at 8 USC §§ 1184(d), 1184(r), and 1375a) IMBRA enabled foreign women to receive critical information before marrying men through these agencies, as it "requires that the U.S. Government provide foreign fiancé(e)s and spouses immigrating to the U.S. information about their legal rights as well as criminal or domestic violence histories of their U.S. citizen fiancé(e)s and spouses".

=== 2006–2010 ===
During this period, Tahirih expanded its services and field office locations, beginning to offer family law representation and opening its first satellite offices in Houston, Texas and Baltimore, Maryland.

In 2008, Tahirih filed an amicus brief for the Second Circuit Court of Appeals in the case of Barry v. Mukasey, arguing that FGM/C can cause permanent and continuing harm to women who are forced to undergo the procedure, often leading to ongoing health issues. Barry was denied asylum as a direct result of the Board of Immigration Appeals decision in Matter of A-T-, where the court held that past FGM/C alone cannot provide a basis for a fear of future persecution, and Matter of A-K-, where the court held that a parent cannot receive derivative asylum to protect a United States citizen child from FGM/C.

In 2009, Tahirih released a report titled Precarious Protection: How Unsettled Policy and Current Laws Harm Women and Girls Fleeing Persecution, which addressed the gaps in gender-based asylum protection and how women and girls are especially impacted by current immigration laws and policies for asylum seekers, including expedited removal, mandatory detention, and the one-year filing deadline. Following the release of this report, Tahirih worked with congressional representatives to introduce the Restoring Protection for Victims of Persecution Act in 2010, a bill to amend the Immigration and Nationality Act to eliminate the one-year filing deadline for applications for asylum in the U.S. However, the bill was not enacted.

With provisions to strengthen the protections for women and girls fleeing gender-based persecution drafted by Tahirih, the Refugee Protection Act of 2010 was introduced to amend the Immigration and Nationality Act and reaffirm the United States commitment to protecting refugees and asylum-seekers fleeing persecution in their home countries, although this bill was not enacted.

=== 2011–2017 ===
Continuing its expansion, Tahirih opened an office in the San Francisco Bay Area and in Atlanta.

In 2011, Tahirih conducted the first-ever national survey on forced marriage in immigrant communities in the United States, which documented as many as 3,000 cases of forced marriage in the U.S. over a two-year period. In response to the results of the survey, Tahirih launched its Forced Marriage Initiative and National Network to Prevent Forced Marriage.

Tahirih began its campaign to end child marriage in the United States with the aim of changing state laws that make child marriage legal and fail to protect minors from "forced marriage, human trafficking, and statutory rape disguised as marriage". In 2016, Tahirih drafted and advocated for the bipartisan passage of SB 415 / HB 703, a bill that made Virginia the first state in the country to limit marriage to legal adults, meaning individuals over the age of 18 or court-emancipated 16- or 17-year-olds. The bill, which addressed findings that 4,500 children had been married in Virginia between 2004 and 2014 according to the Virginia Department of Health, was signed into law by Governor Terry McAuliffe and went into effect on July 1, 2016.

In Texas, Tahirih helped draft and drive forward SB 1705 / HB 3932, a bill that limits marriage to adults age 18 or older, with an exception only for court-emancipated 16- or 17-year-olds who have been given the full legal rights of an adult. The bill, signed into law by Governor Greg Abbott in June 2017, helped close the legal loopholes that made Texas the state with some of the highest number of child marriages in the country.

In August 2017, Tahirih released Falling Through the Cracks: How Laws Allow Child Marriage to Happen in Today's America, a report that analyzed the minimum marriage age laws in all 50 states and the District of Columbia, providing state lawmakers and advocates with the information they need to pass laws that protect children from the harms of child marriage.

Tahirih has spoken out against the Presidential Executive Orders on immigration issued in 2017. On March 28, 2017, Tahirih testified before the House Judiciary Committee's Subcommittee on Immigration and Border Security on the impact of Executive Order 13768 titled Enhancing Public Safety in the Interior of the United States on immigrant survivors of gender-based violence.

Following the release of the United States Department of Homeland Security's new Victim Information and Notification Exchange (DHS-VINE) in 2017, Tahirih and partner organizations discovered that this public database contained identifying information about immigrant victims of domestic violence, human trafficking, and other crimes. Tahirih requested that Immigration Customs and Enforcement (ICE) immediately remove all confidential information from the database, citing that DHS was prohibited from disclosing such information under federal statute. In response to Tahirih's advocacy, ICE removed the federally-protected information from DHS-VINE.

=== 2018 - Present ===
Atlanta Office

In 2025, Tahirih’s Atlanta office introduced a House Resolution with bipartisan sponsorship that encourages the Georgia State General Assembly to adopt language that ensures the protection of immigrant survivors. They also co-sponsored the 24th annual Stand with Survivors Day at the Georgia State Capitol, where Atlanta staff met with legislators to advocate for critical policies to better protect survivors of violence in Georgia, and a Tahirih client had the opportunity to share her story in public for the first time. The Atlanta office also developed and facilitated a statewide training in collaboration with Karibu Community Legacy to equip domestic violence advocates and frontline workers with a strong understanding of immigration processes, cultural considerations, and trauma-informed approaches to support immigrant survivors. This branch of Tahirih provided free services to 291 individuals over the course of 2025.

During the 2026 FIFA World Cup, Tahirih Atlanta strengthened its anti-trafficking response through a Human Trafficking 101 webinar with UPS, continued collaboration with the Atlanta Alliance Against Trafficking, and a panel for Fulton County human services providers advancing coordinated, prevention-focused, and survivor-centered responses across the region.

Houston Office

In 2025, Tahirih’s Houston office featured in a documentary about immigrants in Houston called “Heritage Heroes” as part of The Asian American Foundation City Partners and hosted a fireside chat and premiere of the short documentary. This branch of Tahirih provided free services to 936 individuals over the course of 2025.

Afghan Asylum Project

In 2025, Tahirih successfully concluded their Afghan Asylum Project, through which 189 clients received asylum, and 5 clients have been granted their green cards, enabling them to stay in the United States with their families on a permanent pathway to legal status.

Non-Partisan Policy Advocacy

In 2025, Tahirih helped lead a nationwide survey and report on how immigration policy changes are creating a climate of fear that is negatively impacting immigrant survivors of abuse and crime and making it hard for them to achieve safety and justice, as a co-chair of the Alliance for Immigrant Survivors. They also supported Representatives Moore and Dingell in drafting and publishing a letter to Congress urging the Department of Homeland Security to reinstate a victim-centered approach and to immediately release detained immigrant survivors with pending U and T visa applications from immigration detention. Tahirih’s public policy team also worked closely with Senate Judiciary staff on the Child Marriage Prevention Act and continued to grow support for the legislation to be reintroduced in the 119th Congress, in addition to spearheading the re-introduction of the Working for Immigrant Safety and Empowerment Act by Representative’s Jayapal, Schakowsky, Espaillat, and Panetta.

=== Making Progress, But Still Falling Short: A Report on the Movement to End Child Marriage in America ===
Making Progress, But Still Falling Short outlines what more needs to be done to end child marriage in America both at the state and federal level. It contains the latest analysis (updated November 1, 2022) on all thirty states that have recently enacted laws to end or limit child marriage, calling out features that make them strong or weak.

=== Surviving Deterrence: How U.S. Asylum Deterrence Policies Normalize Gender-Based Violence ===
Surviving Deterrence: How US asylum deterrence policies normalize gender-based violence is a joint report by Oxfam and the Tahirih Justice Center that documents how migrants and asylum seekers experience gender-based harm as a consequence of deterrence-driven US asylum policies. First, it finds that US asylum deterrence policies foster conditions that cause gender-based violence (GBV) to proliferate at the US-Mexico border. Second, it finds that the US asylum process is woefully trauma-uninformed and systemically disadvantages and re-traumatizes survivors of GBV who are ultimately able to apply for relief. The report concludes that by choosing a deterrence-based approach to asylum, the US is complicit in systemically harming and devaluing the lives of women, girls, and LGBTQI+ individuals desperately seeking access to the asylum process as enshrined in US law. These policies, moreover, normalize GBV as an inevitable consequence of pursuing safe haven in the US.

=== Ensuring Equal and Enduring Access to Asylum: Why 'Gender' Must be a Protected Ground ===
Ensuring Equal and Enduring Access to Asylum: Why 'Gender' Must be a Protected Ground, lays out six arguments for why gender must be added as an independent basis – the 6th ground – for asylum under US law.

=== Uplifting Immigrant Survivors: A Report on the Project Empower Guaranteed Income Pilot ===
Project Empower is a first-of-its-kind guaranteed income (GI) program designed to support immigrant survivors of gender-based violence. This program offered unconditional, regular cash transfers of $1000 per month to 10 Tahirih clients, all survivors of domestic violence with a child or children, for six months. A new report from Tahirih and our partner, My New Red Shoes, discusses the experiences and lessons learned from the first cohort.

== Operations ==
"The Tahirih Justice Center is a national, non-profit organization that protects courageous immigrant women and girls who refuse to be victims of violence. We elevate their voices in communities, courts, and Congress to create a world where women and girls enjoy equality and live in safety and with dignity.”

— Tahirih Justice Center Mission Statement

Tahirih offers legal services and social services case management, policy advocacy, and training and education with the aim of protecting immigrant women and girls fleeing gender-based violence.

=== Legal and social services ===
Tahirih provides legal services for immigrant women and girls, with expertise in the areas of gender-based asylum, Violence Against Women Act Petitions, T Visas, U Visas, and Special Immigrant Juvenile Status. Tahirih also provides family law services, engages in civil law, including appellate advocacy and impact litigation, and connects clients to social services.

Tahirih utilizes the services of pro bono attorneys, medical providers, and other professionals to serve its clients.

=== Public policy advocacy ===
Tahirih's engages in non-partisan public policy advocacy focused on ensuring that U.S. laws and policies protect immigrant women and girls from violence and exploitation.

Tahirih's policy advocacy focus areas include protecting the rights of immigrant survivors of crime, promoting access to asylum for women and girls fleeing gender-based persecution, ending the detention of refugee women and children, preventing abuse and exploitation through the international marriage broker industry, and addressing protection gaps for individuals facing forced marriages.

=== Forced marriage protection ===
Through its Forced Marriage Initiative, Tahirih provides support and assistance to individuals in the United States who are facing or fleeing forced marriage in the U.S. or abroad. This initiative also focuses on preventing and abolishing child marriage. Since the FMI was launched in 2016, new child marriage laws have passed in 37 states, three territories, and Washington, D.C., with 17 states, two territories, and D.C. now ending child marriage entirely.

=== Training and education ===
Tahirih offers training and education programs to front-line professionals, including attorneys, judges, police officers, healthcare staff, and social service providers in order to help them support immigrant survivors of gender-based violence.

== Organization and structure ==
The Tahirih Justice Center is governed by a Board of Directors consisting of 20 independent voting members that oversee the organization's functions, establish its strategic direction, and maintain the organization's financial health. Each field office also has locally based advisory councils that provide guidance and ambassadorship for the organization. Archi Pyati is CEO and Layli Miller-Muro is Founder.

Tahirih currently has offices in Greater Washington, District of Columbia, Baltimore, Maryland, Houston, Atlanta, and the San Francisco Bay Area, California.

== Criticism ==
International marriage broker agencies cite the alleged low levels of divorce among their clients, compared with the American national average, as proof of success. Tahirih counters that many of the men who use these brokers are repeat abusers looking for their next victim. Miller-Muro, Tahirih's Executive Director, stated that "The agencies have a financial incentive to ensure the satisfaction of their paying clients – the men – but there is no comparable incentive to safeguard the woman."

When describing the Matter of Kasinga and the associated media attention, anthropologist Charles Piot was concerned about the perpetration of possibly negative and racist stereotypes about Africa. In an analysis of several New York Times articles about the case, Piot called the "evocation of images of the immutable nature of patriarchal tradition" in Africa "extraordinary". Tahirih argues that several cultural practices in the world have adverse health effects that often go unnoticed because of poor education among the local community. Tahirih posits that many of the subjects who undergo practices such as female genital cutting are uninformed about the potential pain and other consequences that result from it. Since Tahirih views these issues as ones relating to human rights, it believes in the protection of individuals who may experience these acts.

== Publications ==
- Precarious Protection: How Unsettled Policy and Current Laws Harm Women and Girls Fleeing Persecution (2009)
- Forced Marriage in Immigrant Communities in the United States (2011)
- Righting the Wrong: Why Detention of Asylum-Seeking Mothers and Children in America Must End (2015)
- Understanding State Statutes on Minimum Marriage Age and Exceptions (2016)
- Falling Through the Cracks: How Laws Allow Child Marriage to Happen in Today's America (2017)

== Awards and recognitions ==
=== Tahirih Justice Center ===
- 2016 Hispanic Bar Association of DC Hugh A. Johnson Jr. Memorial Award (Greater DC Office)
- 2014 Social Impact Business Plan Exchange Competition Finalist
- 2013 Night Court Pro Bono Award (Houston, Texas Office)
- 2008 The Washingtonian Best Local Charities Award
- 2007 Washington Post Award for Excellence in Non-Profit Management
- 2002 The Washington Area Women's Foundation Leadership Award

== See also ==
- Outline of domestic violence
- VAWA Immigration Relief
- T-Visa for Trafficking Victims
- U-Visa for Victims and Witnesses of Qualifying Crimes in the United States
- Asylum, Withholding of Removal, and relief under the Convention Against Torture
