= That Takes Ovaries! =

2002 American non-fiction book

That Takes Ovaries!: Bold Females and Their Brazen Acts
- Author: Rivka Solomon
- Cover artist: Dana Spaeth
- Language: English
- Publisher: Three Rivers Press
- Publication date: 2002
- Publication place: United States
- Pages: 230
- ISBN: 0-609-80659-9

That Takes Ovaries!: Bold Females and Their Brazen Acts is a collection of non-fiction female empowerment stories compiled and edited by Rivka Solomon. Its themes range from women in athletics, polyamory, and handicap bathroom advocacy to immigration challenges, combating sexual violence through artivism, workplace sexism, and more. The book was adapted into two plays—one for women, and one for girls, and became an organization by the same name, which administers events and trainings concerning female leadership and empowerment. Harvard University's Schlesinger Library Experimental Archives Project holds records of the book and its events from 2002 to 2010. By 2013, the book was in its sixth printing.

== History ==
=== Compilation ===
Solomon spent four and a half years collecting and editing the book's entries. Her initial motivation in creating the tome was that she "just thought it would be fun," but under the guiding principle that "courage is infectious," she also "wanted to celebrate female risk takers in a wide range of activities" and "wanted to affirm women and girls who are already risk takers in their lives." Additionally, she "wanted to encourage others, readers who might not live their lives that way, to take the bold new step of being a risk taker."

=== Select stagings, open mics, and academic research ===
In 2003, the Asian American Theatre Revue produced the stage adaptation of That Takes Ovaries! at The Culture Project in New York City. The same year, Washington D.C.'s Horizons Theatre, the longest-running women's theatre in the United States, staged a four-week run of the play.

In 2005, the Davis Square Theatre in Boston staged the That Takes Ovaries! play.

In 2006, the year of the book's reissue, Hecate's Australian Women's Book Review published "Having a Pair: Ovaries and Oratory," a journalistic piece on the book's impact, citing the 300 open mic events that took place over the course of a mere four years, spawned by the book's publication. The paper further cited more That Takes Ovaries! open mic fundraisers that would soon be taking place in countries as diverse as Italy, Australia, and India, with various entities benefiting from the fundraising efforts, including "local women's groups and international causes, with a particular emphasis on [combating] female genital mutilation and separately, sex slavery." The same year, on International Women's Day, the University of Jadavpur in West Bengal, Kolkata, India, in association with the West Bengal State AIDS Prevention and Control Society and the Thoughtshop Foundation, hosted a That Takes Ovaries! event. Also in 2006, Foothill College staged a That Takes Ovaries! event for the opening ceremonies of the college's Women's History Month activities.

In 2009, the Women's and Gender Equity Center of the University of Wisconsin Eau Claire sponsored a That Takes Ovaries! event.

In 2010, the Women's Studies Program, Honors Program, Women's Center, College of Arts and Sciences, Ethnic Studies, Organization for Women's Issues, and Residence Life organization at Bowling Green State University sponsored a That Takes Ovaries! event. The same year, Philadelphia University and Thomas Jefferson University, in partnership with the Women's Resource Committee and the Campus Activities Board, hosted a That Takes Ovaries! event. In March 2010, the University of Nebraska Medical Center staged a That Takes Ovaries! reading.

In November 2011, the Wilkinson College of Arts, Humanities, and Social Sciences at Chapman University, in association with the university's student government association; Department of Peace Studies; Department of Sociology; and dean of students, housing, and residence life sponsored a That Takes Ovaries! event. Also in 2011, the play version of the book was put on at Hollywood's Stella Adler Theatre, in benefit of the Los Angeles Women's Theater Project. The same year, Grand Valley State University staged the That Takes Ovaries! play.

In 2012, the book was used as the foundation for “Courage Is Contagious": The Use of 'That Takes Ovaries!' Drama Therapy to Empower Women and Girls, a Missouri State University Master's thesis by Autumn Ivy Nelson. The same year, Grand Valley State University hosted a That Takes Ovaries! event. The same year, Kentucky's Elizabethtown Community & Technical College staged a That Takes Ovaries! event. In April 2012, the University of Indianapolis hosted a That Takes Ovaries! open mic.

In 2013, the University of Massachusetts Graduate Women's Network circulated a call for women's stories to be published in a sequel to That Takes Ovaries! titled That Takes Ovaries II: More Bold Females, More Brazen Acts. The same year, the University of Alaska Anchorage in association with the Department of Women's Studies hosted a That Takes Ovaries! event.

In 2014, the Radcliffe Institute for Advanced Study at Harvard University published "Deconstructing That Takes Ovaries," a paper on the archival methods behind preserving the work and the movement it spawned.

In 2016, St. Cloud State University in Minnesota staged a That Takes Ovaries! event through their women's center.

In November 2019, That Take Ovaries! was cited in “Bringing the World to the Classroom”: Cultural Studies and Experiential Learning, a cultural studies work by Basak Durgun.

In February 2020, the podcast Wine About Birth hosted their first live recording in the lineage of That Takes Ovaries!

== Contributing authors ==
=== Chapter 1 ===
- Kathleen Tarr -- Preaching to the Convicted: She makes a burglar cry by lecturing him about black pride while in her underwear.
- Frezzia Prodero -- Alps-ward Bound: She jumps off a moving train to see the Alps.
- Bobbi Ausubel -- Hands On, Hands Off: A girl grabs the hand of someone molesting her; an adult confronts a pickpocket.
- Cecelia Wambach -- Amen for Sneaky Women: She sneaks in to see the Pope and even sits in the front row.
- Beth Mistretta -- Fat Grrlz Kick Ass: A 16-year-old fat girl climbs a rope in gym class.
- Monique Bowden -- Paying for It: She persuades a pimp to pay her just to talk.
- Rivka Solomon -- Selling the Berlin Wall: She sells pieces of the Berlin Wall and gets arrested.
- Bonnie Morris -- Educating Bill Clinton: She tells President Clinton to stay for the women’s basketball game — and he does.
- D.H. Wu -- Saving Mommy, or The Night I Lost My Childhood: At six, she saves her mom from suicide.
- Tara Betts -- Nothing From Nobody: A Black child stands up to a white cop during a “driving while black” incident.
- Louise Civetti -- I Swear!: She swears with her boss playfully after a board meeting.
- Gwyn McVay -- You Can Take That Law and …: She invites cops to a “legalize it” pot rally.

=== Chapter 2 ===
- Lynda Gaines
- Anitra Winder
- Iris Stammberger
- Rebecca Walker
- Wilma Mankiller
- Mireya Herrera

=== Chapter 3 ===
- Amelia Copeland
- Cecilia Tan
- Tess Dehoog
- Amanda Rivera
- Robin Renee
- Joani Blank
- Julia Acevedo
- Sabrina Margarita Alcantra-Tan
- Molly Kenefick

=== Chapter 4 ===
- Denise Grant
- Amy Chambers
- Mary Ann McCourt
- Elaine Marshall
- Anonymous
- Eva
- Ruchira Gupta
- Maite Sureda
- Kym Trippsmith

=== Chapter 5 ===
- Alison Kafer
- Julia Willis
- Mica Miro
- Sasha Claire McInnes
- Connie Panzarino
- Kathryn Roblee
- Jane Colby
- Elizabeth Young
- Adrienne
- Krissy
- Amy Richards
- Phoebe Eng
- Fauziya Kassindja

=== Chapter 6 ===
- Jessica Brown
- Rachel
- Loolwa Khazzoom
- Kathy Bruin
- Debra Kolodny
- Terri M. Muehe
- Rana Husseini

=== Chapter 7 ===
- Mary Going
- Kathleen Antonia
- Judith K. Witherow
- Audrey Schaefer
- Elizabeth O'Neill
- Vashti
- Hilken Mancini
- Christine Maxfield Stone
