= Loolwa Khazzoom =

American singer

- Education: Barnard College
- Writing career
- Genre: Non-fiction
- Subjects: Multiculturalism; Culture

Loolwa Khazzoom (Arabic: لولوا خزوم) is an Iraqi American-Jewish writer, journalist, activist, and musician. She has spoken and written extensively about Jewish multiculturalism as well as the cultural traditions and modern struggles of Sephardi, Mizrahi, Yemenite, and Ethiopian Jews. She was heavily involved in the Jewish feminist movement of the 1990s and is the founder of the Jewish Multicultural Project. She has also worked as a public relations manager for health and wellness practitioners.

== Early life ==
Khazzoom was raised in California by an American Jewish mother and an Iraqi Jewish father. She received a Jewish education as a child, and first encountered the othering effects of being a Mizrachi Jew at her school: "I was only seven when I started reading from a Mizrahi prayer book, and my teachers would make faces and say nasty things about me in front of the class. They wanted me to be doing what everybody else was doing - that is, reading an Ashkenazi prayer book in Ashkenazi style." She attended Barnard College, graduating in 1991.

== Jewish multicultural and feminist work ==
Khazzoom is the founder of the Jewish Multicultural Project, which provides educational resources to Jewish communities about diversity in Jewish culture and tradition. She was also involved in SOJIAC (Student Organization for Jews from Iran and Arab Countries) and JIMENA (Jews Indigenous to the Middle East and North Africa). She participated in the filming of The Way Home, a documentary about the interplay of race and gender in America, and played a significant role in diversifying the group of Jewish women represented in the film. She is featured in the Jewish Women's Archive's online exhibit Jewish Women and the Feminist Revolution for her work on topics of multiculturalism and gender. Khazzoom is featured in the documentary, Young, Jewish, and Left.

== Books ==
Khazzoom's first book, Consequence: Beyond Resisting Rape, was published in 2002. It follows the adventures of Khazzoom as she pushes the envelopes in responding to daily doses of sexual harassment. A review from the Street Harassment Project stated that “the fact that Khazzoom has been brave enough to fiercely raise the question should prompt us to read this book, and, at the very least, consider how we live our lives and how we would like to live our lives.”

In 2003, Khazzoom edited "The Flying Camel: Essays on Identity by Women of North African and Middle Eastern Jewish Heritage," the first English-language anthology devoted to the writings of Mizrahi Jewish women. Contributors included Rachel Wahba, Ella Shohat, and Lital Levy. A review from InterfaithFamily called her editing “truly admirable” and stated that “The power of this book is clear: these women are ready to tell their stories and will not stop until they are heard.”

== Other writings ==
Khazzoom wrote an essay for the book Yentl’s Revenge: The Next Wave of Jewish Feminism discussing the double alienation of being both female and Iraqi in Jewish spaces. She also contributed an essay called "Synagogue Revolt" to 2002's That Takes Ovaries!: Bold Females and Their Brazen Acts.

Khazzoom's freelance writing has appeared in Jewish publications such as Hadassah, Lilith Magazine, Tikkun, Jewish Telegraphic Agency and the Forward. She has also been published several times in Bridges: A Journal for Jewish Feminists and Our Friends. Additionally, Khazzoom has written several articles for Rolling Stone about Israeli hip-hop, and been published numerous times in HuffPost on topics regarding health and wellness.

== Music career ==
Khazzoom is the lead singer and bass player of Iraqis in Pajamas, a punk rock band that incorporates traditional Iraqi and Jewish musical elements. She has written articles for the Forward, Lilith Magazine and the Jewish Journal of Los Angeles about the band's role in addressing the complexity of Iraqi Jewish identity.
