= Layli Miller-Muro =

American lawyer (born 1972)

- Born: Layli Sitarih Miller; March 24, 1972 (age 54)
- Education: Agnes Scott College (BA); American University (MA, JD)
- Occupations: Founder and previous CEO, Tahirih Justice Center

Layli Miller-Muro (née Bashir; born March 24, 1972) is an American attorney and activist. She is the founder and former CEO of Tahirih Justice Center, a national non-profit dedicated to protecting women from human rights abuses such as rape, female genital mutilation/cutting, domestic violence, human trafficking, and forced marriage. Tahirih's holistic model for protection combines free legal services and social services case management with public policy advocacy, education, and outreach.

== Human rights advocacy ==
Miller-Muro founded the organization in 1997 following her involvement in Matter of Kasinga, a high-profile case that set national precedent and changed asylum law in the United States. Fauziya Kassindja (born 1977), who had fled Togo in fear of a forced polygamous marriage and a tribal practice known as female genital mutilation, was granted asylum in 1996 by the U.S. Board of Immigration Appeals.

This decision opened the door to recognizing gender-based persecution as grounds for asylum. Using her portion of the proceeds from a book she and Kassindja co-authored about the case (Do They Hear You When You Cry? Delacorte Press, 1998), Miller-Muro established Tahirih.

Since 2001, she has led the Tahirih Justice Center in serving more than 25,000 women and children since 1997, growing the non-profit from a staff of 6 to over 70, and expanding its offices from Greater DC to Houston, Baltimore and San Francisco. In recognition of its sound management and innovative programs, under Miller-Muro's leadership, the Tahirih Justice Center won The Washington Post Award for Management Excellence and gained recognition for its innovative use of pro bono services in the Stanford Social Innovation Review.

Prior to joining the Tahirih Justice Center as executive director in 2001, Miller-Muro was an attorney at the Washington, D.C., law firm of Arnold & Porter, where she practiced international litigation. Prior to joining Arnold & Porter, Miller-Muro was an attorney-advisor at the U.S. Department of Justice, Board of Immigration Appeals.

== Education ==
Miller-Muro received her JD and MA in International Relations from American University and B.A. from Agnes Scott College, specializing in political science, sociology and anthropology.

== Recognition ==
Among her many awards and recognitions, Miller-Muro was named DC Young Mother of the Year in 2015 by American Mothers Inc. She was also named one of 50 powerful women religious leaders to celebrate on International Women's Day in 2014 by The Huffington Post, and, in 2013, she received an honorary doctorate from Northern Illinois University.

In 2012, she was recognized for her work at the Tahirih Justice Center and named one of Newsweek/The Daily Beast 's 150 Most Fearless Women in the World. In the same year, she received Diane Von Fürstenberg's People's Voice Award and made the list of Goldman Sachs' Top 100 Most Innovative Entrepreneurs. Additionally, in 2010, she was awarded the Smart CEO Brava! Women Business Achievement Award which recognizes 25 female executives who are exemplary leaders within their companies and communities at large.

== Personal life ==
Miller-Muro lives in Washington D.C., with her husband, Gil Miller-Muro, and their three children. She is an active member of the Baháʼí Faith.

== See also ==
- Baháʼí Faith and gender equality
