= Aminata Diop =

Malian woman

Aminata Diop (born c. 1978) is a Malian woman who in 1989 fled to France to escape a female genital mutilation (FGM) procedure. She applied for asylum in October 1990, and is believed to have been the first woman to cite FGM as a reason for seeking refugee status. Both Diop's initial application and an appeal in September 1991 were denied on technical grounds, as she had failed to seek help from the Malian government before fleeing the country. However, she was subsequently allowed to stay in France.

== Life in Mali ==
Diop was born into a Muslim family in Sikasso, a large town in Mali's south, with her native language being Bambara. At the age of 12, she was sent to school in the capital Bamako. Diop was betrothed to the son of her father's best friend at the age of eight, but a wedding was not scheduled until much later. According to the local tradition, she was required to undergo a ritual circumcision before she could be married, which would involve the removal of her clitoris and inner labia. As her best friend had recently died from the procedure, Diop begged both her father and her future husband for an exemption, but they refused and her father beat her.

On the day she was to undergo the procedure, Diop ran away from home, walking and hitchhiking to an aunt's house in Bamako. Her aunt threw her out once she explained why she had run away, but a friend who worked for a Belgian airline organised a passport and bought her a one-way ticket to Brussels. From there, she travelled to Paris. Because Diop had not fulfilled the terms of her marriage contract, her father had to refund the bridewealth to the groom's family. He subsequently laid the blame for his daughter's defiance on his wife, who he threw out of the house.

== Life in France and asylum claim ==
In France, Diop initially stayed with a Malian couple she had known previously. She was later taken in by Renée Boutet de Monvel, a gynaecologist and anti-FGM campaigner. In October 1990, Diop applied to the French government for political asylum, under the terms of the Convention Relating to the Status of Refugees. She is believed to have been the first woman in any country to cite genital mutilation as a reason for seeking asylum. Diop's first application was rejected, but her lawyer, Linda Weil-Curiel, appealed the decision. At the appeal in September 1991, the Commission for Appeals of Refugees again denied her asylum, on the grounds that she had not sought help from the Malian government before leaving the country. However, it did agree that women fleeing FGM were protected under the Refugee Convention, becoming the first judicial body to do so.

Weil-Curiel, Diop's lawyer, has expressed the view that the French government denied Diop's asylum application for political reasons – a positive ruling would have opened a new channel for African immigration, and thus contradicted the government's anti-immigration stance. Due to public outcry over the decision, including an international letter-writing campaign, the government allowed Diop to remain in the country. She initially received a three-month temporary visa, which was extended by a year in December 1991 and later extended indefinitely. Diop suffered a period of depression when she first arrived in France, but in October 1992, it was reported that she was adapting better, taking daily French classes and working part-time as an office cleaner.

== See also ==
- Fauziya Kassindja, a Togolese teenager who sought asylum in the U.S. in 1996 under similar circumstances
