= Indigenous Language Institute =

The Indigenous Language Institute (ILI) is a nonprofit organization that works to preserve and pass on language traditions within indigenous groups located in North America. The organization was founded in 1992 as the Preservation of Original Languages of the Americas (IPOLA), and it has since worked closely with various indigenous peoples, including Native Hawaiians, Alaska Natives, and indigenous citizens of both Canada and the United States. The organization seeks to create sustainable avenues for the teaching of indigenous languages, and to do so, they have created numerous forms of brochures, conducted on-site research, and catalogued many sources digitally for any indigenous group to access.

== History ==
The Indigenous Language Institute was founded in 1992 by Joanna Hess. Originally, the organization was known as the Institute for the Preservation of Original Languages of the Americas (or IPOLA), but this was changed to the ILI in 2000. The organization claims that this transition to the Indigenous Language Institute was because the new name more effectively emphasized their goal of creating and preserving language traditions among indigenous groups. The IPOLA was founded under the idea that language is important to the preservation of culture, and they have worked alongside various indigenous groups across North America. The IPOLA's first mission after being founded was to create a collection of bilingual children's books for the Hotevilla-Bacavi Community School of the Hopi in Hotevilla, Arizona. Since this initial collaboration, the IPOLA/ILI has worked with indigenous groups across North America and continues in their goal of preserving language traditions. Other early collaborations occurred between IPOLA and New York State, as well as New Mexico and California.

== Core focuses ==
Since its conception, the Indigenous Language Institute has been a non-profit organization that works alongside indigenous groups to preserve their language traditions. The ILI focuses on four different subjects regarding indigenous language, those being perpetuation, sharing of information, public education, and preservation for future generations. In order to accomplish these goals, the ILI emphasizes three central themes in their work: research, teach, and share. Through these tenets, the Indigenous Language Institute hopes to create more speakers of these languages as a way to pass on cultural traditions of indigenous groups.

From 1999 to 2001, members of the ILI conducted the Field Research Project, which saw them travelling to over 50 different indigenous groups and working alongside them to preserve their language and help teach future generations about their culture. In the years following this project, the successful strategies were recorded in a series of small booklets. The second booklet of the ten produced explains how to properly prepare materials which could be used to teach indigenous language, and the booklet emphasizes the importance of starting this teaching process at an early age. This booklet series is still used and distributed by the ILI today as an effective tool in the process of language preservation.

The Indigenous Language Institute has also worked to provide language resources and services to indigenous groups digitally, whether it be through videos, transcribed texts, or online seminars. In 2012, the Indigenous Language Institute partnered with Google to create an up-to-date list of endangered languages that could be accessed online. This collaboration was part of a worldwide initiative to record endangered languages across the globe. The COVID-19 pandemic of 2020 halted much of the face-to-face language teaching that took place, and the ILI looks to use technology to continue their efforts in language studies and teaching during the global pandemic.
