= Fauziya Kassindja =

Togolese writer (born 1977)

- Born: 1977 (age 48–49); Kpalimé, Togo
- Occupation: Author
- Writing career
- Pen name: Fauzia Kasinga
- Notable work: Do They Hear You When You Cry?

Fauziya Kassindja (or Fauzia Kasinga, born 1977) is the author of Do They Hear You When You Cry? an autobiographical story of her refusal to submit to female genital mutilation and a forced marriage.

In 1994, Kassindja fled Togo and traveled first to Germany, where she obtained a fake passport, and then to the United States where she immediately informed immigration officials that her documents were false and requested asylum. She was detained by the U.S. Citizenship and Immigration Services and imprisoned. Kassindja's family hired a law student, Layli Miller, to advocate for her asylum, who in turn enlisted the help of Karen Musalo, an expert in refugee law and then acting director of the American University International Human Rights Clinic. Fauziya was granted asylum on 13 June 1996, in the landmark decision Matter of Kasinga.

In 2002, Kassindja contributed an essay called Remaining Whole While Behind Bars to the book That Takes Ovaries!: Bold Females and Their Brazen Acts (Three Rivers Press, 2002). She lives in Alexandria, Virginia.
