= Northwest Portland Area Indian Health Board =

Tribal advisory organization in Portland, Oregon

Northwest Portland Area Indian Health Board Logo

The Northwest Portland Area Indian Health Board (NPAIHB) is a non-profit tribal advisory organization in Portland, Oregon, run and organized by participating tribes. It was established in 1972 to focus on four areas as they pertain to the health of Native people: health promotion and disease prevention, legislative and policy analysis, training and technical assistance, and surveillance and research. It serves 43 federally recognized tribes in Oregon, Washington and Idaho, with each tribe appointing a delegate to the board that oversees the NPAIHB. The board meets quarterly to discuss current projects and issues.

== Mission ==
The mission of the NPAIHB is: “to eliminate health disparities and improve the quality of life of American Indians and Alaska Natives by supporting Northwest Tribes in their delivery of culturally appropriate, high quality healthcare.” Its slogan is “Indian Leadership for Indian Health.”

In fulfilling its mission, the NPAIHB seeks to support tribes in addressing health problems, to present unified position on health issues facing Indian communities, to provide partnership with Indian Health Services and other governmental organizations, and to advocate for issues related to Indian health.

== Services ==
The Northwest Portland Area Indian Health Board houses the Northwest Tribal Epidemiology Center (The EpiCenter or NWTEC). The NWTEC provides research, surveillance, training and technical assistance to the 43 federally recognized tribes of the Portland Area of Indian Health Service. At the direction of the Board of Delegates, the NWTEC performs research and surveillance programs pertaining to health and quality of life of American Indians and Alaska Natives. The NWTEC receives core funding from the Indian Health Service. In addition, the NWTEC has funding for projects from the Centers for Disease Control and Prevention (CDC) and the National Institutes of Health (NIH), along with other federal agencies and non-governmental foundations.

The NWTEC's functions and status as Public Health Authorities are outlined in the Patient Protection and Affordable Care Act, Indian Health Care Improvement Act (Title 25, Chapter 18 Indian Health Care 161m(2010))

The Portland Area Institutional Review Board (IRB) of the Indian Health Service (IHS) is run through the Northwest Portland Area Indian Health Board. It reviews all research that uses IHS facilities, data, staff resources, or funding and that affects members of the Portland Area American Indian and Alaska Native (AI/AN) population and tribes. It collaborates with the National IHS IRB.

== Current projects ==
Current projects of the NWTEC:

Northwest Tribal Immunization Project

Improving Data and Enhancing Access (IDEA-NW)

Northwest Tribal Dental Support Center

Project Red Talon

WE R NATIVE

Native STAND

Hepatitis C Treatment and ECHO

Western Tribal Diabetes Program ()

Northwest Comprehensive Cancer Prevention Program

Native Children Always Ride Safe (Native CARS)

Tots to 'Tweens

Native American Research Centers for Health (NW-NARCH)

Summer Research Training Institute

Thrive (Suicide Prevention)

Good Health and Wellness in Indian Country (WEAVE-NW)

Injury Prevention Project

Public Health Emergency Preparedness Conference

Environmental Health Tracking Project
