= Brian D. Smedley =

American academic and medical researcher

Brian Smedley
- Education: Harvard University (BA); University of California, Los Angeles (MA, PhD)
- Known for: Health equity Racial disparities in health
- Scientific career
- Fields: Health policy Psychology
- Institutions: National Collaborative for Health Equity; Joint Center for Political and Economic Studies
- Thesis: Environmental Climate Perceptions, Psychosocial Stress, Social Supports, and Adaptational Outcomes among African-American College Students: A Test of a Social-Ecological Model (1992)

Brian D. Smedley is known for his work on health equity. He is the co-founder and executive director of the National Collaborative for Health Equity. He was formerly the vice president and director of the Joint Center for Political and Economic Studies' Health Policy Institute from 2008 to 2014. Before that, he was the co-founder and research director of the communications, research, and policy organization the Opportunity Agenda. He has also been a senior program officer at the Division of Health Sciences Policy of the Institute of Medicine, and the Director for Public Interest Policy at the American Psychological Association.
