= Choice feminism =

Forms of feminism that emphasize freedom of choice

Choice feminism is a critical term for expressions of feminism that emphasize women’s freedom of choice. Such expressions seek to be “non-judgmental” and to reach as many allies as possible, which is considered depoliticization by its critics.

Despite its individualistic aspect, choice feminism differs from individualist feminism in that it is not deliberately a movement. It has been associated with neoliberalism and postfeminism.

== Origins ==
Linda Hirshman first used the term in Get to Work: A Manifesto for Women of the World (2006) to oppose the alleged free choice of housewives. Her argument centered around the societal harms of women sacrificing their career aspirations to stay at home.

"Choice feminism", the shadowy remnant of the original movement, tells women that their choices, everyone's choices, the incredibly constrained "choices" they made, are good choices.

In her essay “Choice Feminism and the Fear of Politics”, gender studies scholar Michaele Ferguson argues that choice feminism emerges in response to the accusations of feminism being too radical, exclusionary and judgemental. It seeks to be the opposite of that, sometimes approaching postfeminism.

Understood as an orientation, choice feminism has three important features. First, it understands freedom as the capacity to make individual choices, and oppression as the inability to choose. Consequently, as long as a woman can say that she has chosen to do something, it is considered by choice feminists to be an expression of her liberation. Second, since the only criterion for evaluating women’s freedom is individual choice, we should abstain from judging the content of the choices women make. It is definitionally impossible for a woman to choose her own oppression; all choices she makes are equally expressions of her freedom, and therefore equally to be supported. Finally, this view of freedom is supported by a particular historical narrative: it is the women’s movement in the past that has made it possible for women to make free choices in the present.

== Analysis ==
Michaele Ferguson identifies a great influence of liberal individualism in choice feminism. She cites Amy Richards, Jennifer Baumgardner, Naomi Wolf, and Rebecca Walker as examples of choice feminists.

Serene J. Khader critiques choice feminism in her book Faux Feminism: Why We Fall for White Feminism and How We Can Stop. Khader argues against prioritizing individual choice in feminist movements and seeing feminist progress primarily in terms of the successes of individual women. She suggests that emphasizing individual choice undermines efforts to bring about structural change, arguing that "the dilution of feminism into respect for individual freedom is justifying policies and actions that don't actually do anything for the majority of women." Khader argues that feminists should fight for the good of all women rather than focusing on helping elite women succeed.

== See also ==
- Abortion-rights movement
- Anarcha-feminism
- Bodily integrity
- Freedom of choice
- Intersectionality
- Lesbian feminism
- Liberal feminism
- Lipstick feminism
- Postfeminism
- Reproductive rights
- Self-ownership
- Sex worker movements
- Sex workers' rights
- Sex-positive feminism
- Sexual and reproductive health and rights
- Third-wave feminism
- Victim feminism
- White feminism
