= Manifesta: Young Women, Feminism, and the Future =

Feminist literature

- Author: Jennifer Baumgardner, Amy Richards
- Publication date: October 4, 2000
- ISBN: 0-374-53230-3

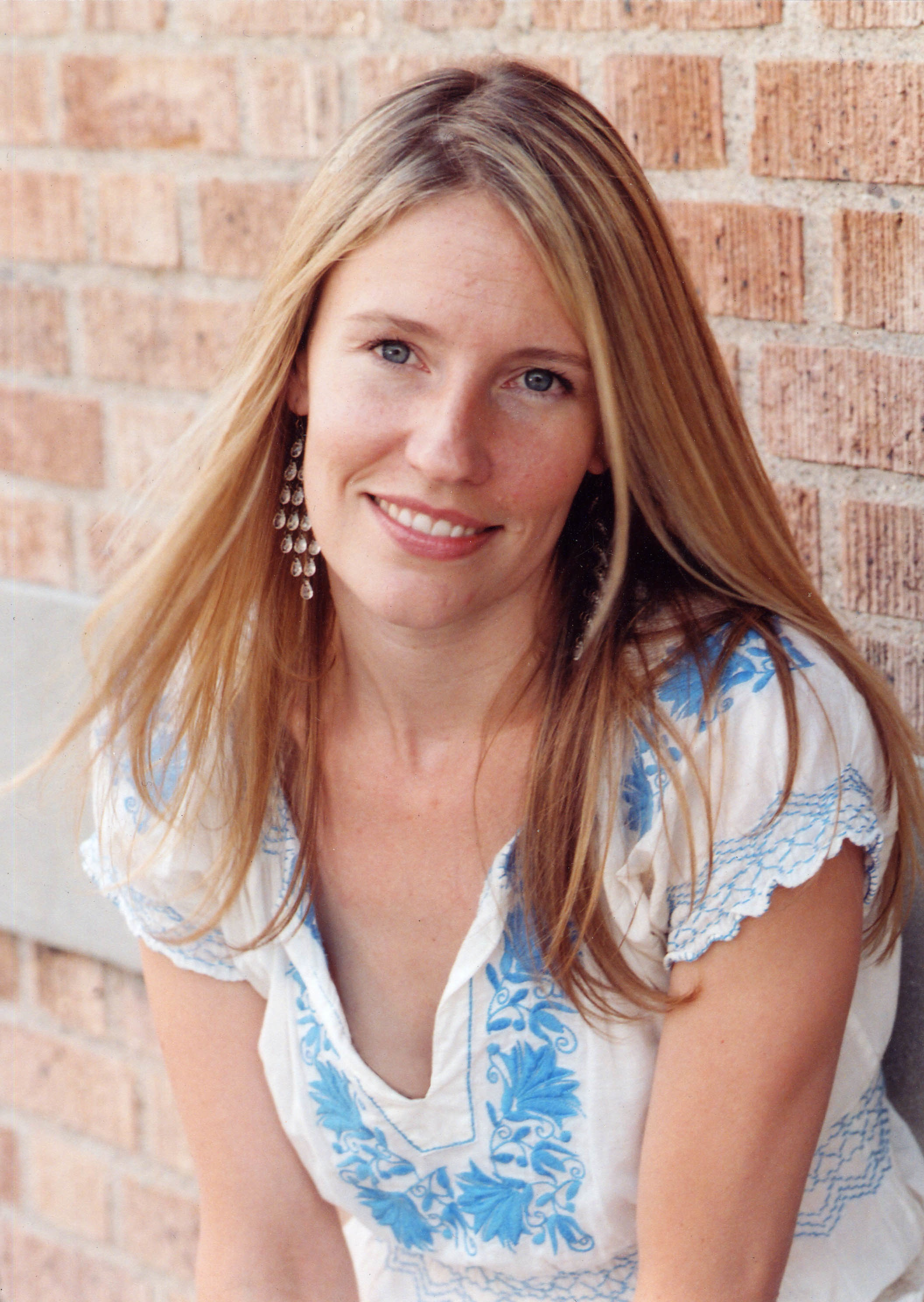
Author Jennifer Baumgardner

Manifesta: Young Women, Feminism, and The Future is a piece of feminist literature written by activists and writers Jennifer Baumgardner and Amy Richards. This book was published on October 4, 2000 by Farrar, Straus, and Giroux and both 10th and 20th anniversary editions have also been published. This book is regarded as a key piece of literature in the Third-Wave Feminism movement that occurred in the 1990s. Manifesta was designed to record feminism during the Third-Wave and seeks to ask and answer the question: what does it mean to be feminist? It planted the idea and practice of intersectionality that we see in America today. Since the publishing of Manifesta the world has changed and so has the book. The 10th anniversary and 20th anniversary editions include updated resources and additional information about the authors as well as updated timelines and bibliographies.

== Summary ==
Manifesta: Young Women, Feminism, and the Future is a third-wave feminist text intended to educate young women about the history and achievements of previous waves of feminism, particularly the second wave. It seeks to provide a foundation for understanding what feminism truly means and to dispel negative connotations often associated with earlier generations of feminists. The authors express deep appreciation for the work done by prior generations while emphasizing the importance of bridging generational gaps in the feminist movement.

The book opens with a prologue titled A Day Without Feminism, which highlights the persistent inequalities women face, both at home and in the workplace. Baumgardner and Richards claim that women are often depicted as the weaker, subservient gender, confined by societal expectations and the threat of ostracism. This section underscores how the efforts of past feminists have significantly improved the role of women in society- progress that is often underappreciated.

Following the prologue are eight chapters: The Dinner Party, What is Feminism?; Feminists Want to Know: Is the Media Dead?; Girl, You’ll Be a Woman Soon; Barbie vs. the Menstrual Kit; Thou Shalt Not Become Thy Mother; Who’s Afraid of Katie Roiphe?; and What Is Activism?. These chapters combine original insights from Baumgardner and Richards with discussions of key feminist figures and movements, including Women Make Movies, Katie Roiphe's The Morning After: Sex, Fear, and Feminism on Campus, and Zora Neale Hurston, alongside many others, from historical to contemporary feminists.

The book concludes with the epilogue A Day with Feminism, which envisions a society fully integrated with feminist values, where coed sports are the norm, women can feel safe at night, bodily autonomy and privacy are upheld, and true gender equality has been achieved. “The social-justice movement, formerly known as feminism, is now just life.”

== Authors ==
=== Jennifer Baumgardner ===
Jennifer Baumgardner is a writer, producer, activist, and speaker best known for her contribution to the third-wave feminist movement. Baumgardner frequently addresses disputed issues, which she refers to as "common-but-silenced" topics. Among these topics are sexual assault, abortion, and sexuality. One of her primary goals is to encourage conversations about the shared experiences that are often considered sensitive or unacceptable.

Currently, Baumgardner serves as the founder and publisher of Dottir Press, a woman-owned imprint dedicated to feminist literature, which includes LIBER: A Feminist Review. This magazine focuses on conversations surrounding feminist literature, culture, theory, and history, with Baumgardner as the chief editor.

Baumgardner's other notable works include: Grassroots: A Field Guide for Feminist Activism (2004), Look Both Ways: Bisexual Politics (2007), and Abortion & Life (2008).

=== Amy Richards ===
Amelia Richards is an activist, producer, writer, organizer, and co-founder of the Third Wave Foundation, also known as the Third Wave Fund. She writes to shed light on the subliminal messages present in our society, despite the widespread ignorance surrounding them. Richards believes in an "unspoken collectiveness" among feminists, which contributes to the visibility and passion of the feminist movement.

Richards produced the Emmy-nominated series WOMAN for Viceland, and has been involved in numerous film projects. She also serves as the president of Soapbox Inc., the largest feminist speakers' bureau, organizing thousands of impactful events. Additionally, she oversees the affiliated Soapbox Foundation, which created Feminist Camp, an acclaimed program where campers collaborate with feminist peers to engage in non-profit work, volunteer, protest, and turn feminist theory into action.

Richards' other notable works include serving as a consulting producer on HBO documentary Gloria Steinem: In Her Own Words, PBS documentary MAKERS: Women Making America, and authoring Opting In: Having a Child Without Losing Yourself.
