= Natalie Marshall =

American social media influencer

Instagram information
- Page: Corporate Natalie

TikTok information
- Page: corporatenatalie

YouTube information
- Channel: Corporate Natalie

Natalie Marshall is an American social media influencer known as Corporate Natalie. Marshall was named Forbes 30 Under 30 in 2023. In 2021, The Cut named Corporate Natalie as a TikToker to follow. She has over 2 million followers across TikTok, LinkedIn and Instagram.

== Career ==
Marshall started her career at Deloitte as a consultant in 2019. During the 2020 COVID-19 pandemic, Marshall started posting videos to TikTok, satirizing the new normal of work-from-home environments in the corporate world. Her Day In The Life video went viral, and she continued to post videos, amassing a following.

The New York Times reported that Corporate Natalie "riffs" on life inside the corporate office space. She co-hosted the podcast Demoted with Ross Pomerantz, which ran from January 24 through August 2025. Marshall is part of the Corporate TikTok creator genre.

In 2024, she appeared in a Dunkin' Donuts commercial with Will Arnett called the "Dunkin'Terns," which also featured Joey Fatone, AJ McLean, chef Nick DiGiovanni, Yoon Ahn, and Twitch Streamer SypherPK. That same year, she appeared in The Charlie Puth Show on Roku which also starred Charlie Puth, Ruby Karp, John Legend, Will Ferrell, Dorinda Medley, Courteney Cox, Wiz Khalifa and Law Roach.

== Personal ==
Marshall is based in San Francisco. She announced her engagement to Matt Mahowald in 2025. She is a Swiftie. She attended the University of Notre Dame for her undergraduate degree.
