= Ruby Karp =

American writer and comedian (born 2000)

- Born: August 30, 2000 (age 26)
- Education: Emerson College
- Occupations: Comedian, Writer and Actor

Ruby Karp (born August 30, 2000) is an American writer and comedian. Karp grew up in New York City, attending the LaGuardia School of Performing Arts. She graduated from Emerson College in 2022.

== Writing ==
Karp began writing professionally in 2011 at the age of 10 when Molly McAleer, co-founder of Hello Giggles, asked her to contribute to the website by writing "Ruby's Corner," a weekly column that covered a variety of topics involving her observations and life experiences. She has also written articles for Mashable titled "I'm 13 and None of My Friends Use Facebook", which went viral, and "How 13-Year-Olds Really Use Snapchat". In 2017, she published her first book, Earth Hates Me, an inside look at being a teenager. She has also written for Refinery29.

== Comedy ==
On her third birthday, Karp found herself onstage at UCB as a guest on Talk Show with Paul Scheer and Jake Fogelnest. Since then, she's performed monologues at ASSSSCAT, a monoscene with Chris Gethard, and appeared in an alien costume in a performance of the Broad City Live show in 2012. In 2004, she appeared on the first episode of Shutterbugs with Aziz Ansari and Rob Huebel on the MTV sketch comedy television show Human Giant. In 2008, when she was 7 years old, Karp spoke about being a feminist with Amy Poehler on her web series Smart Girls at the Party. She performed in a variety of shows at UCB and, in January 2012, started hosting the story-telling show, Hello Giggles Presents Very Important Things. This show was renamed to We Hope You Have Fun when it shifted to a stand-up format. She has performed stand up at other UCB shows including Fresh Out, Adulting, and Andy Blitz and Andy Blitz's Friends. We Hope You Have Fun paused during the pandemic, and when Karp moved to LA, she re-launched the show at Dynasty Typewriter.

In 2024, Karp co-starred in "The Charlie Puth Show," starring Charlie Puth. It was a faux-reality comedy series on Roku and featured cameos by Will Ferrell, John Legend, Weird "Al" Yankovic, Rosie O'Donnell and more.

In 2025, Karp performed a six-week run of her first one person show at the SoHo Playhouse, I Don't Trust Adults. The special premiered on Veeps on September 10, 2026.

She has also performed at comedy festivals such as Netflix is A Joke, Just For Laughs, and New York Comedy Festival.

== Speaking ==
Karp won a MOTH Story Slam when she was 12 years old at Housing Works in New York City. She spoke about being a feminist at TEDxRedmond in September 2013. She was an ambassador for Dove on positive body image and spoke at the UN on this topic on September 25, 2014. She hosted the second annual Student Voice Live on September 20, 2014. In September 2017, she moderated the B-Fest panel at Barnes and Noble. She co-hosted the 2018 Teen Vogue Summit with Jenna Ortega.

== Digital ==
In 2019, Karp appeared in the Comedy Central digital short, Pitch Please.

Karp was a video producer at Betches from 2022 to 2024. Her notable contributions include her Gen-Z character. In 2024, she joined the digital team at After Midnight on CBS.

== Personal life ==
Karp lives in Los Angeles. Her mother, Marcelle Karp, is a writer and a co-founder of the women's lifestyle magazine Bust.
