= Marcelle Karp =

American feminist writer, editor, and television director and producer

Marcelle Karp is an American feminist, writer, editor, and Creative Director. She is the co-founder of BUST Magazine. She is the author of 2022’s Getting Over Max Cooper.

== Early life and education ==
Karp graduated from Baruch College in 2021. She got her Masters in Women and Gender Studies from The Graduate Center at CUNY in 2023.

== Career ==
In 1993, Karp and Debbie Stoller produced the first issue of Bust, "The Magazine for Women With Something to Get Off Their Chests", since seen as one of the flagship publications of third-wave feminism, for mixing feminism with sexuality. Betty Boob was the name that Karp used in writing for the magazine (Stoller used Celina Hex). The two women met while working for Nickelodeon in New York City. They built a grassroots following, eventually distributing 100,000 copies of each issue. Her 1999 book with Stoller, "The Bust Guide to the New Girl Order", is a collection of articles from that magazine. She was forced out of Bust in 2001.

After she left Bust, Karp began a career in broadcast as a creative director, working for BET, fuse, MSG, Lifetime, and VH1. She continued to write for publications including Sesame Street Workshop, Publishers Weekly and Covey Club. In 2012, she produced the live stand-up show Hello Giggles Presents at the Upright Citizen's Brigade Theatre, hosted by her daughter, Ruby Karp. It eventually became We Hope You Have Fun. Karp remains active as an activist, and spoke at Riot Fest in 2014. Her debut YA novel, Getting Over Max Cooper, was released in April 2022.

== Personal life ==
Marcelle Karp is the mother of writer Ruby Karp. Karp is a mentor with Unlock Her Potential, which was founded by Sophia Chang.
