= Third-wave feminism =

Feminist movement, 1990s–2010s

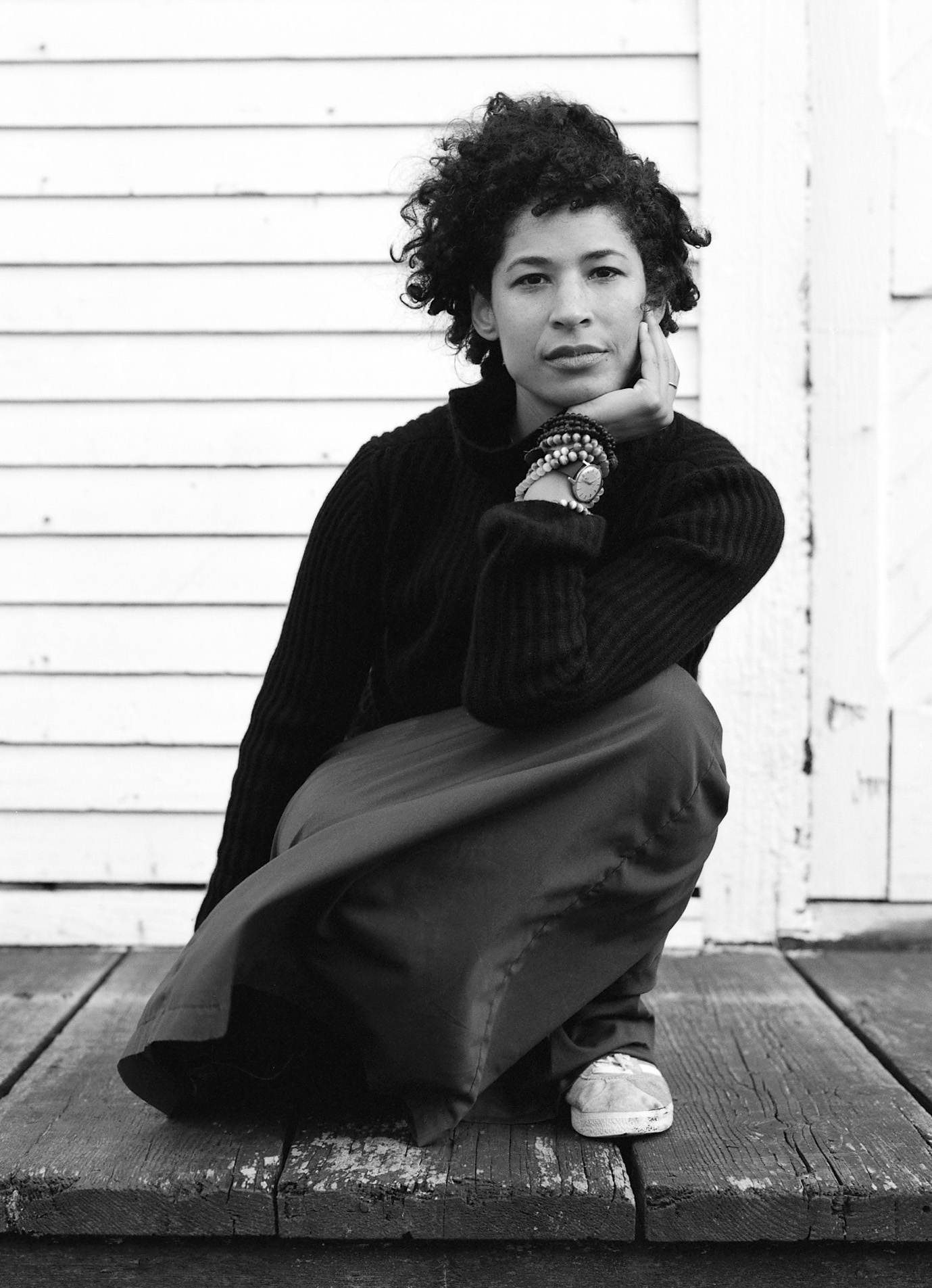
Rebecca Walker in 2003. The term third wave is credited to Walker's 1992 article "Becoming the Third Wave".

Third-wave feminism is a feminist movement that began in the early 1990s; it was prominent in the decades prior to the fourth wave. Grounded in the civil-rights advances of the second wave, Gen X third-wave feminists born in the 1960s and 1970s embraced diversity and individualism in women, and sought to redefine what it meant to be a feminist. The third wave saw the emergence of new feminist currents and theories, such as intersectionality, sex positivity, vegetarian ecofeminism, transfeminism, and postmodern feminism. According to feminist scholar Elizabeth Evans, the "confusion surrounding what constitutes third-wave feminism is in some respects its defining feature."

The third wave is traced to Anita Hill's televised testimony in 1991 to an all-male all-white Senate Judiciary Committee that the judge Clarence Thomas had sexually harassed her. The term third wave is credited to Rebecca Walker, who responded to Thomas' appointment to the Supreme Court with an article in Ms. magazine, "Becoming the Third Wave" (1992). She wrote:

So I write this as a plea to all women, especially women of my generation: Let Thomas' confirmation serve to remind you, as it did me, that the fight is far from over. Let this dismissal of a woman's experience move you to anger. Turn that outrage into political power. Do not vote for them unless they work for us. Do not have sex with them, do not break bread with them, do not nurture them if they don't prioritize our freedom to control our bodies and our lives. I am not a post-feminism feminist. I am the Third Wave.

Walker sought to establish that third-wave feminism was not just a reaction but a movement in itself because the feminist cause had more work ahead. The term intersectionality to describe the idea that women experience "layers of oppression" caused, for example, by gender, race, and class had been introduced by Kimberlé Crenshaw in 1989, and it was during the third wave that the concept flourished.

In addition, third-wave feminism is traced to the emergence of the riot grrrl feminist punk subculture in Olympia, Washington, in the early 1990s. (Note: Steve Feliciano (New York Public Library, 2013): "The emergence of the Riot Grrrl movement began in the early 1990s, when a group of women in Olympia, Washington, held a meeting to discuss how to address sexism in the punk scene. The women decided they wanted to start a 'girl riot' against a society they felt offered no validation of women's experiences. And thus the Riot Grrrl movement was born.") As feminists came online in the late 1990s and early 2000s and reached a global audience with blogs and e-zines, they broadened their goals, focusing on abolishing gender-role stereotypes and expanding feminism to include women with diverse racial and cultural identities.

== Background ==
The rights and programs gained by feminists of the second wave served as a foundation for the third wave. The gains included Title IX (equal access to education), public discussion about the abuse and rape of women, access to contraception and other reproductive services (including the legalization of abortion), the creation and enforcement of sexual-harassment policies for women in the workplace, the creation of domestic-abuse shelters for women and children, child-care services, educational funding for young women, and women's studies programs.

Feminists of color such as Gloria E. Anzaldúa, bell hooks, Cherríe Moraga, Audre Lorde, Maxine Hong Kingston, Leslie Marmon Silko and the members of the Combahee River Collective sought to negotiate a space within feminist thought for consideration of race. Cherríe Moraga and Gloria E. Anzaldúa had published the anthology This Bridge Called My Back (1981), which, along with All the Women Are White, All the Blacks Are Men, But Some of Us Are Brave (1982), edited by Akasha (Gloria T.) Hull, Patricia Bell-Scott, and Barbara Smith, argued that second-wave feminism had focused primarily on the problems of white women. The emphasis on the intersection between race and gender became increasingly prominent. However, allowing third wave feminism to adopt the paradigm of intersectionality can erase the narrative of second-wave feminist of color who worked towards inclusion.

In the late 1970s and early 1980s, the feminist sex wars arose as a reaction against the radical feminism of the second wave and its views on sexuality, countering with a concept of "sex-positivity", and heralding the third wave.

Another crucial point for the start of the third wave is the publication in 1990 of Gender Trouble: Feminism and the Subversion of Identity by Judith Butler, which soon became one of the most influential works of contemporary feminist theory. In it, Butler argued against homogenizing conceptions of "women", which had a normative and exclusionary effect not only in the social world more broadly but also within feminism. This was the case not only for racialized or working-class women, but also for masculine, lesbian, or non-binary women. They outlined their theory of gender as performativity, which posited that gender works by enforcing a series of repetitions of verbal and non-verbal acts that generate the "illusion" of a coherent and intelligible gender expression and identity, which would otherwise lack any essential property. Lastly, Butler developed the claim that there is no "natural" sex, but that what we call as such is always already culturally mediated, and therefore inseparable from gender. These views were foundational for the field of queer theory, and played a major role in the development of third-wave feminist theories and practices.

=== Global Influence ===
Third-wave feminism has spread beyond the US and inspired activists and feminist movements worldwide. In Europe, younger feminists used the ideas of individuality and intersectionality to fight against gender inequalities, such as discrimination at work and reproductive rights. In Latin America, newfound feminist ideas influenced campaigns against male violence towards women and helped grow public conversations about women's autonomy and social justice. Feminist organizations in South Asia integrated third-wave ideas by creating digital spaces for women to question traditional gender roles and advocate for legal and cultural reforms. Africa's activists drew on the movement's emphasis on diversity and personal empowerment to strengthen reforms for girls' education and leadership, as well as political participation.

== Early years ==
=== Anita Hill ===
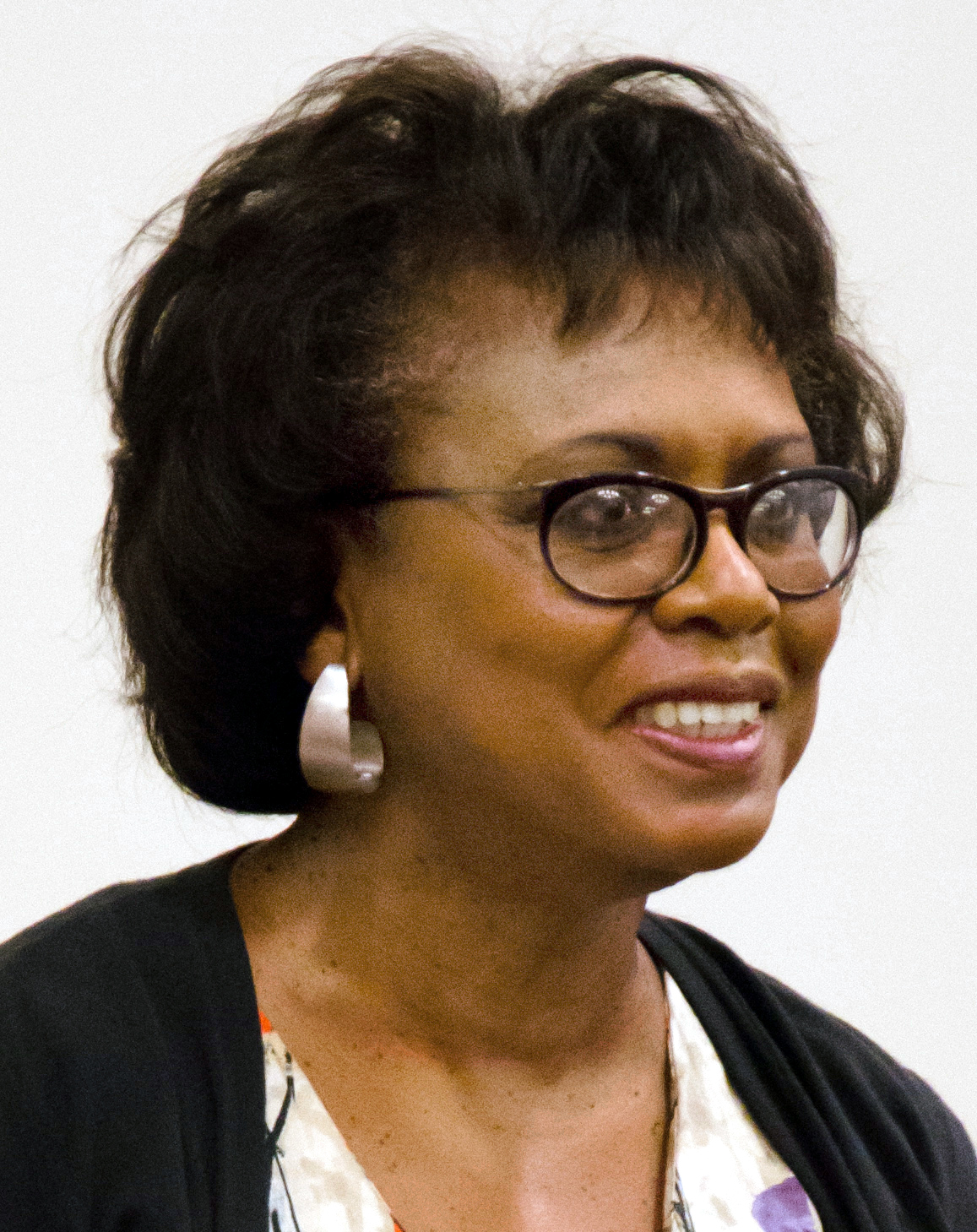
Anita Hill, 2014

In 1991, Anita Hill, when questioned, accused Clarence Thomas, an African-American judge who had been nominated to the United States Supreme Court, of sexual harassment. Thomas denied the accusations, calling them a "high-tech lynching". After extensive debate, the United States Senate voted 52–48 in favor of Thomas. In response, Ms. Magazine published an article by Rebecca Walker, entitled "Becoming the Third Wave", in which she stated: "I am not a post-feminism feminist. I am the third wave." Many had argued that Thomas should be confirmed, despite Hill's accusations, because of his plans to create opportunities for people of color. When Walker asked her partner his opinion and he said the same thing, she asked: "When will progressive black men prioritize my rights and well-being?" She wanted racial equality but without dismissing women.

In 1992, dubbed the "Year of the Woman", four women entered the United States Senate to join the two already there. The following year, another woman, Kay Bailey Hutchison, won a special election, bringing the number to seven. The 1990s saw the US's first female Attorney General (Janet Reno) and Secretary of State (Madeleine Albright), as well as the second woman on the Supreme Court, Ruth Bader Ginsburg, and the first US First Lady, Hillary Clinton, to have had an independent political, legal and activist career.

=== Riot grrrl ===
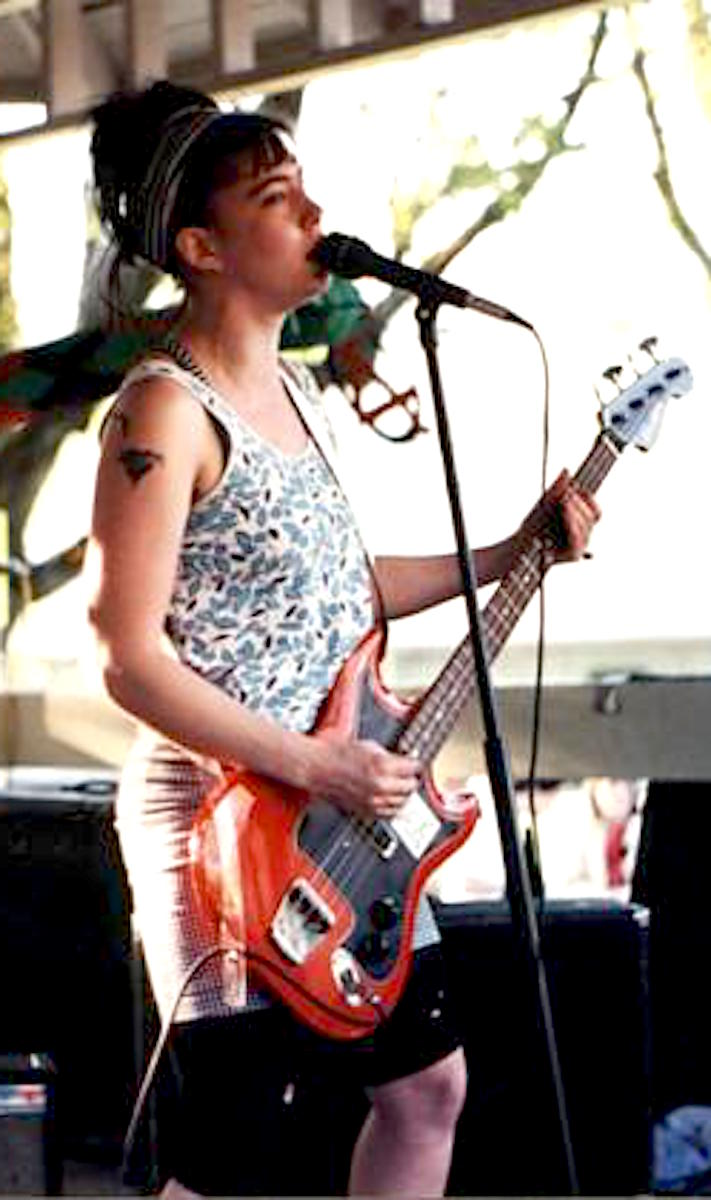
Kathleen Hanna, lead singer of Bikini Kill, 1991

The emergence of riot grrrl, the feminist punk subculture, in the early 1990s in Olympia, Washington, marked the beginning of third-wave feminism. The triple "r" in grrrl was intended to reclaim the word girl for women. Alison Piepmeier writes that riot grrrl and Sarah Dyer's Action Girl Newsletter formulated "a style, rhetoric, and iconography for grrrl zines" that came to define third-wave feminism, and that focused on the viewpoint of adolescent girls. Based on hard-core punk rock, the movement created zines and art, talked about rape, patriarchy, sexuality, and female empowerment, started chapters, and supported and organized women in music. An undated^{but collected by 2013} Bikini Kill tour flier asked "What is Riot grrrl?":

BECAUSE in every form of media I see us/myself slapped, decapitated, laughed at, objectified, raped, trivialized, pushed, ignored, stereotyped, kicked, scorned, molested, silenced, invalidated, knifed, shot, choked, and killed. ... BECAUSE a safe space needs to be created for girls where we can open our eyes and reach out to each other without being threatened by this sexist society and our day to day bullshit. ... BECAUSE we girls want to create mediums that speak to US. We are tired of boy band after boy band, boy zine after boy zine, boy punk after boy punk after boy. BECAUSE I am tired of these things happening to me; I'm not a fuck toy. I'm not a punching bag. I'm not a joke.

Riot grrrl was grounded in the DIY philosophy of punk values, adopting an anti-corporate stance of self-sufficiency and self-reliance. Its emphasis on universal female identity and separatism often appeared more closely allied with second-wave feminism. Bands associated with the movement included Bratmobile, Excuse 17, Jack Off Jill, Free Kitten, Heavens to Betsy, Huggy Bear, L7, Fifth Column, and Team Dresch, and most prominently Bikini Kill.

Riot grrrl culture gave people the space to enact change on a macro, meso and micro scale. As Kevin Dunn explains:

Using the do-it-yourself ethos of punk to provide resources for individual empowerment, Riot Grrrl encouraged females to engage in multiple sites of resistance. At the macro-level, Riot Grrrls resist society's dominant constructions of femininity. At the meso-level, they resist stifling gender roles in punk. At the micro-level, they challenge gender constructions in their families and among their peers.

The demise of riot grrrl is linked to commodification and misrepresentation of its message, mainly through media coverage. Writing in Billboard magazine, Jennifer Keishin Armstrong states:

In the early 1990s, the women's movement seemed dead to the mainstream. Few pop cultural figures embraced the term "feminist." The underground punk movement known as "Riot Grrrl" scared anyone outside of it, while Alanis Morissette's breakthrough single "You Oughta Know" scared everyone else even more. Then, in the middle of the decade, the Spice Girls took all of that fear and made feminism – popularized as Girl Power – fun. Suddenly, regular girls far outside Women's Studies classrooms had at least an inkling of what would be known in wonky circles as Third Wave Feminism – led by Generation Xers pushing for sexual freedom and respect for traditionally "girly" pursuits like makeup and fashion, among many other issues.

El Hunt of NME states, "Riot grrrl bands in general were very focused on making space for women at gigs. They understood the importance of giving women a platform and voice to speak out against abusers. For a lot of young women and girls, who probably weren't following the Riot grrrl scene at all, The Spice Girls brought this spirit into the mainstream and made it accessible."

== Purpose ==
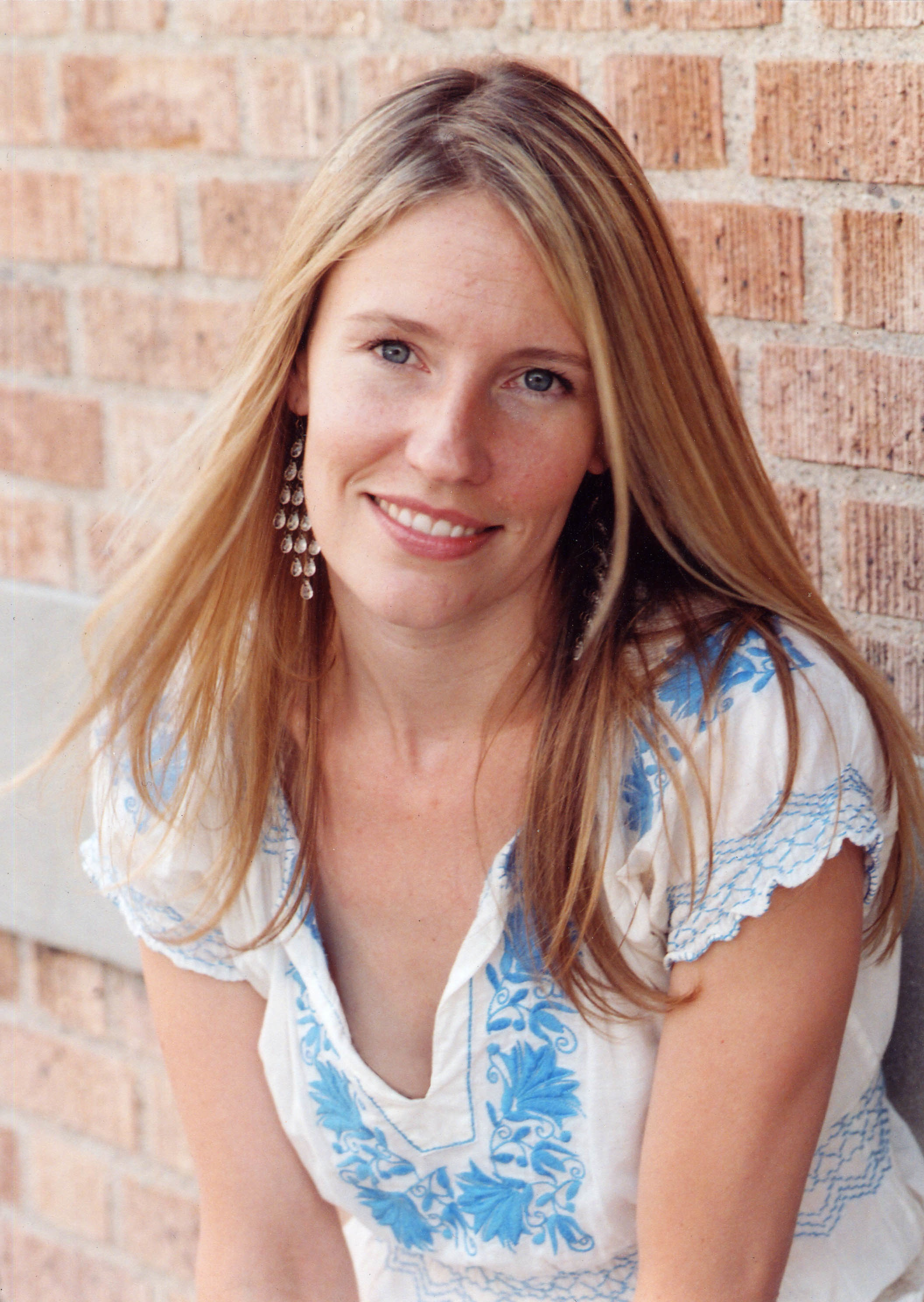
Jennifer Baumgardner, co-author of Manifesta (2000), in 2008

Arguably the biggest challenge to third-wave feminism was that the gains of second-wave feminism were taken for granted, and the importance of feminism not understood. Baumgardner and Richards (2000) wrote: "[F]or anyone born after the early 1960s, the presence of feminism in our lives is taken for granted. For our generation, feminism is like fluoride. We scarcely notice that we have it—it's simply in the water."

Essentially the claim was that gender equality had already been achieved, via the first two waves, and further attempts to push for women's rights were irrelevant and unnecessary, or perhaps even pushed the pendulum too far in women's favor. This issue manifested itself in the heated debates about whether affirmative action was creating gender equality or punishing white, middle-class males for the biological history that they had inherited. Third-wave feminism therefore focused on Consciousness raising—"one's ability to open their mind to the fact that male domination does affect the women of our generation, is what we need.

Third-wave feminists often engaged in "micro-politics", and challenged the second wave's paradigm as to what was good for women. Proponents of third-wave feminism said that it allowed women to define feminism for themselves. Describing third-wave feminism in Manifesta: Young Women, Feminism And The Future (2000), Jennifer Baumgardner and Amy Richards suggested that feminism could change with every generation and individual:

The fact that feminism is no longer limited to arenas where we expect to see it—NOW, Ms., women's studies, and redsuited congresswomen—perhaps means that young women today have really reaped what feminism has sown. Raised after Title IX and William Wants a Doll [sic], young women emerged from college or high school or two years of marriage or their first job and began challenging some of the received wisdom of the past ten or twenty years of feminism. We're not doing feminism the same way that the seventies feminists did it; being liberated doesn't mean copying what came before but finding one's own way—a way that is genuine to one's own generation.

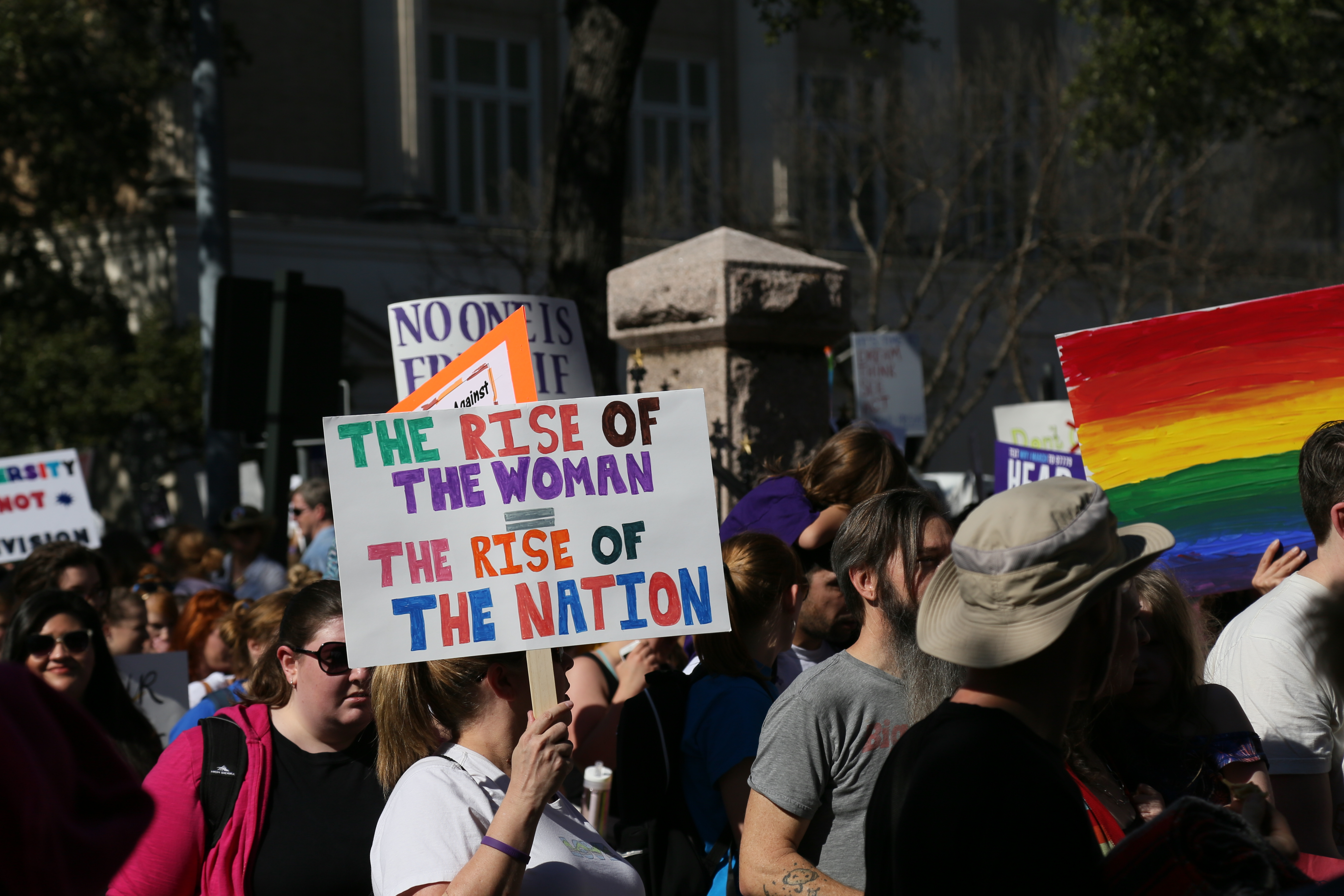
Protesters at a women's march in 2017

Third-wave feminists used personal narratives as a form of feminist theory. Expressing personal experiences gave women space to recognize that they were not alone in the oppression and discrimination they faced. Using these accounts has benefits because it records personal details that may not be available in traditional historical texts.

Third-wave ideology focused on a more post-structuralist interpretation of gender and sexuality. Post-structuralist feminists saw binaries such as male–female as an artificial construct created to maintain the power of the dominant group. Joan W. Scott wrote in 1998 that "poststructuralists insist that words and texts have no fixed or intrinsic meanings, that there is no transparent or self-evident relationship between them and either ideas or things, no basic or ultimate correspondence between language and the world". (Note: Amber Lynn Zimmerman, M. Joan McDermott, and Christina M. Gould wrote in 2009 that third-wave feminism offered five primary focuses: (1) Responsible choice grounded in dialogue; (2) respect and appreciation for experiences and dynamic knowledge; (3) an understanding of "the personal is political" that incorporates both the idea that personal experiences have roots in structural problems and the idea that responsible, individuated personal action has social consequences; (4) use of personal narratives in both theorizing and political activism; (5) political activism as local, with global connections and consequences.)

=== Relationship with second wave ===
The second wave of feminism is often accused of being elitist and ignoring groups such as women of colour and transgender women; instead, it focused on white, middle class, cisgender women. Third wave feminists questioned the beliefs of their predecessors and began to apply feminist theory to a wider variety of women, who had not been previously included in feminist activity.

Amy Richards defined the feminist culture for the third wave as "third wave because it's an expression of having grown up with feminism". Second-wave feminists grew up where the politics intertwined within the culture, such as "Kennedy, the Vietnam War, civil rights, and women's rights". In contrast, the third wave sprang from a culture of "punk-rock, hip-hop, 'zines, products, consumerism and the Internet". In an essay entitled "Generations, Academic Feminists in dialogue" Diane Elam wrote:

This problem manifests itself when senior feminists insist that junior feminists be good daughters, defending the same kind of feminism their mothers advocated. Questions and criticisms are allowed, but only if they proceed from the approved brand of feminism. Daughters are not allowed to invent new ways of thinking and doing feminism for themselves; feminists' politics should take the same shape that it has always assumed.

Rebecca Walker, in To Be Real: Telling the Truth and Changing the Face of Feminism (1995), wrote about her fear of rejection by her mother (Alice Walker) and her godmother (Gloria Steinem) for challenging their views:

Young Women feminists find themselves watching their speech and tone in their works so as not to upset their elder feminist mothers. There is a definite gap among feminists who consider themselves to be second-wave and those who would label themselves as third-wave. Although, the age criteria for second-wave feminists and third-wave feminists is murky, younger feminists definitely have a hard time proving themselves worthy as feminist scholars and activists.

== Issues ==
=== Violence against women ===
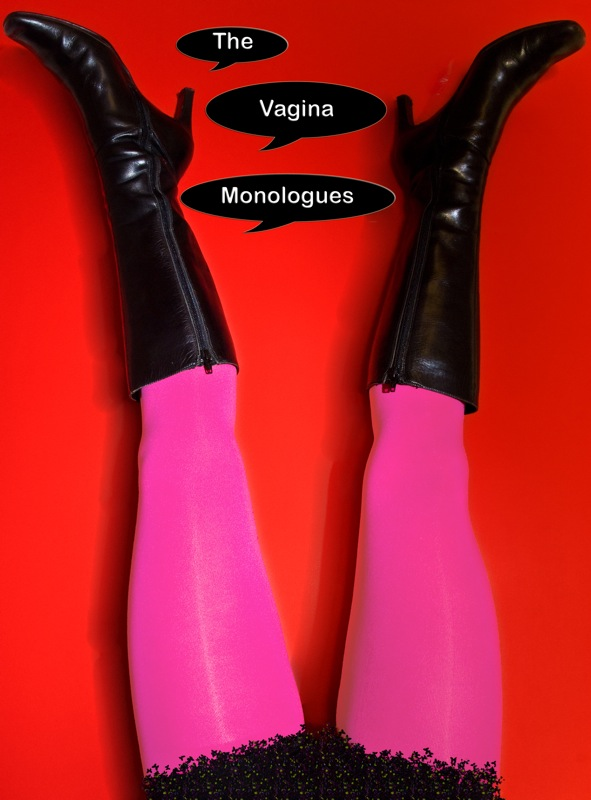
The Vagina Monologues premiered in New York in 1996.

Violence against women, including rape, domestic violence, and sexual harassment, became a central issue. Organizations such as V-Day formed with the goal of ending gender violence, and artistic expressions, such as The Vagina Monologues, generated awareness. Third-wave feminists wanted to transform traditional notions of sexuality and embrace "an exploration of women's feelings about sexuality that included vagina-centred topics as diverse as orgasm, birth, and rape".

=== Reproductive rights ===
One of third-wave feminism's primary goals was to demonstrate that access to contraception and abortion are women's reproductive rights. According to Baumgardner and Richards, "It is not feminism's goal to control any woman's fertility, only to free each woman to control her own." South Dakota's 2006 attempt to ban abortion in all cases, except when necessary to protect the mother's life, and the US Supreme Court's vote to uphold the partial birth abortion ban were viewed as restrictions on women's civil and reproductive rights. Restrictions on abortion in the US, which was mostly legalized by the 1973 Supreme Court decision in Roe v. Wade, were becoming more common in states around the country. These included mandatory waiting periods, parental-consent laws, and spousal-consent laws.

=== Reclaiming derogatory terms ===
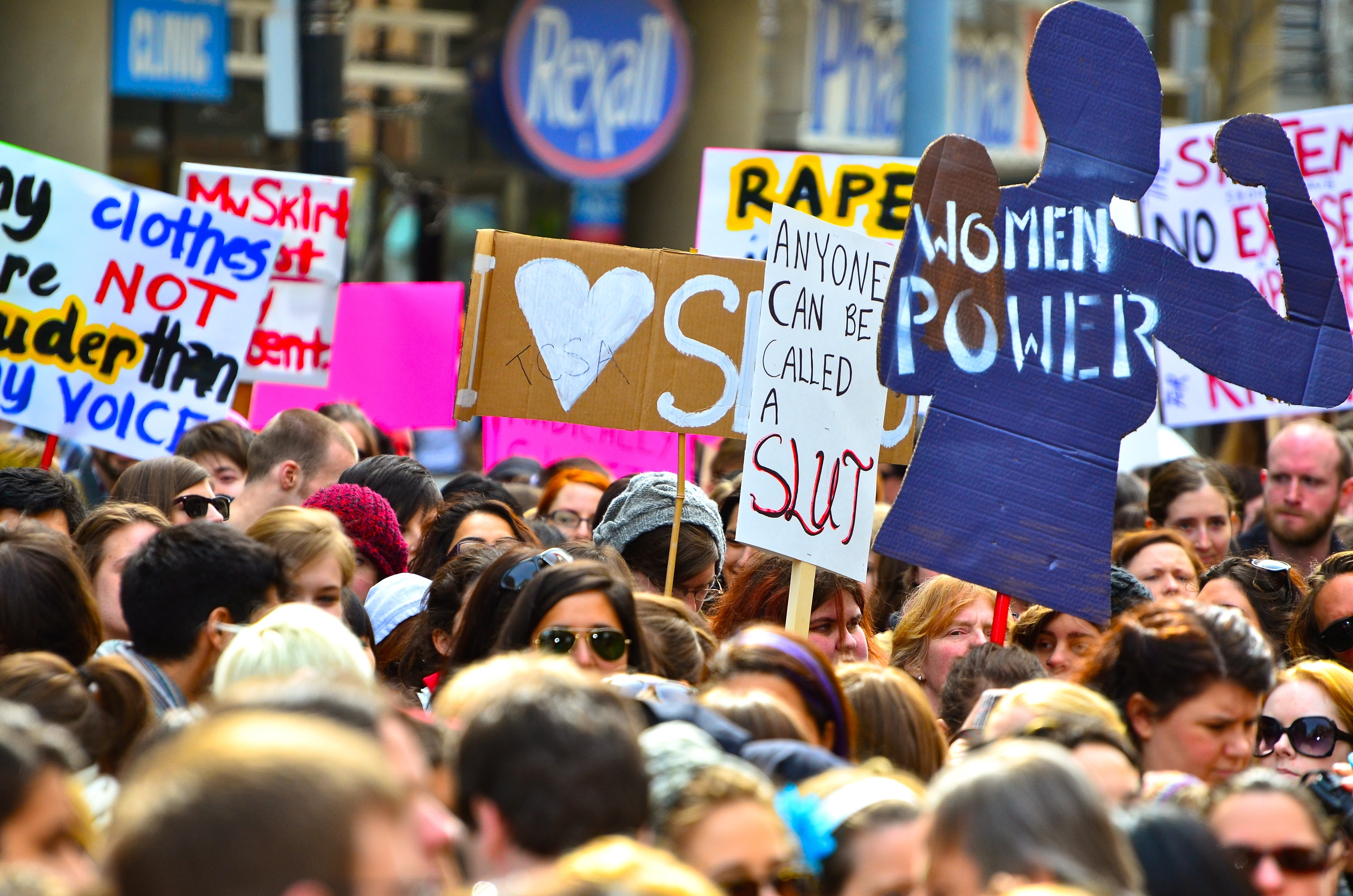
The first Slutwalk, Toronto, 2011

English speakers continued to use words such as spinster, bitch, whore, and cunt to refer to women in derogatory ways. Inga Muscio wrote, "I posit that we're free to seize a word that was kidnapped and co-opted in a pain-filled, distant past, with a ransom that cost our grandmothers' freedom, children, traditions, pride and land." Taking back the word bitch was fueled by the single "All Women Are Bitches" (1994) by the all-woman band Fifth Column, and by the book Bitch: In Praise of Difficult Women (1999) by Elizabeth Wurtzel.

The utility of the reclamation strategy became a hot topic with the introduction of SlutWalks in 2011. The first took place in Toronto on 3 April that year in response to a Toronto police officer's remark that "women should avoid dressing like sluts in order not to be victimized." Additional SlutWalks sprang up internationally, including in Berlin, London, New York City, Seattle, and West Hollywood. Several feminist bloggers criticized the campaign; reclamation of the word slut was questioned.

=== Sexual liberation ===
Third-wave feminists expanded the second-wave feminist's definition of sexual liberation to "mean a process of first becoming conscious of the ways one's gender identity and sexuality have been shaped by society and then intentionally constructing (and becoming free to express) one's authentic gender identity". Since third-wave feminism relied on different personal definitions to explain feminism, there is controversy surrounding what sexual liberation really entails. Many third-wave feminists supported the idea that women should embrace their sexuality as a way to take back their power.

=== Other issues ===
Third-wave feminism regarded race, social class, and transgender rights as central issues. It also paid attention to workplace matters such as the glass ceiling, unfair maternity-leave policies, motherhood support for single mothers by means of welfare and child care, respect for working mothers, and the rights of mothers who decide to leave their careers to raise their children full-time.

== Criticism ==
=== Lack of cohesion ===
One issue raised by critics was a lack of cohesion because of the absence of a single cause for third-wave feminism. The first wave fought for and gained the right for women to vote. The second wave fought for the right for women to have access to an equal opportunity in the workforce, as well as the end of legal sex discrimination. The third wave allegedly lacked a cohesive goal and was often seen as an extension of the second wave. Some argued that the third wave could be dubbed the "Second Wave, Part Two" when it came to the politics of feminism and that "only young feminist culture" was "truly third wave". One argument ran that the equation of third-wave feminism with individualism prevented the movement from growing and moving towards political goals. Kathleen P. Iannello wrote:

The conceptual and real-world 'trap' of choice feminism (between work and home) has led women to challenge each other rather than the patriarchy. Individualism conceived of as 'choice' does not empower women; it silences them and prevents feminism from becoming a political movement and addressing the real issues of distribution of resources.

=== Objection to "wave construct" ===
Feminist scholars such as Shira Tarrant objected to the "wave construct" because it ignored important progress between the periods. Furthermore, if feminism is a global movement, she argued, the fact that the "first-, second-, and third waves time periods correspond most closely to American feminist developments" raises serious problems about how feminism fails to recognize the history of political issues around the world. The "wave construct", critics argued, also focused on white women's suffrage and continued to marginalize the issues of women of color and lower-class women.

=== Relationship with women of color ===
Third-wave feminists proclaim themselves as the most inclusive wave of feminism. Critics have noted that while progressive, there is still exclusion of women of color. Black feminists argue that "the women rights movements were not uniquely for the liberation of Blacks or Black Women. Rather, efforts such as women's suffrage and abolition of slavery ultimately uplifted, strengthened, and benefited White society and White women".

=== "Girly" feminism ===
Third-wave feminism was often associated, primarily by its critics, with the emergence of so-called "lipstick" or "girly" feminists and the rise of "raunch culture". This was because these new feminists advocated "expressions of femininity and female sexuality as a challenge to objectification". Accordingly, this included the dismissal of any restriction, whether deemed patriarchal or feminist, to define or control how women or girls should dress, act, or generally express themselves. These emerging positions stood in stark contrast with the anti-pornography strains of feminism prevalent in the 1980s. Second-wave feminism viewed pornography as encouraging violence towards women. The new feminists posited that the ability to make autonomous choices about self-expression could be an empowering act of resistance, not simply internalized oppression.

Such views were critiqued because of the subjective nature of empowerment and autonomy. Scholars were unsure whether empowerment was best measured as an "internal feeling of power and agency" or as an external "measure of power and control". Moreover they critiqued an over-investment in "a model of free will and choice" in the marketplace of identities and ideas. Regardless, the "girly" feminists attempted to be open to all different selves while maintaining a dialogue about the meaning of identity and femininity in the contemporary world.

Third-wave feminists said that these viewpoints should not be limited by the label "girly" feminism or regarded as simply advocating "raunch culture". Rather, they sought to be inclusive of the many diverse roles women fulfill. Gender scholars Linda Duits and Liesbet van Zoonen highlighted this inclusivity by looking at the politicization of women's clothing choices and how the "controversial sartorial choices of girls" and women are constituted in public discourse as "a locus of necessary regulation". Thus the "hijab" and the "belly shirt", as dress choices, were both identified as requiring regulation but for different reasons. Both caused controversy, while appearing to be opposing forms of self-expression. Through the lens of "girly" feminists, one can view both as symbolic of "political agency and resistance to objectification". The "hijab" could be seen as an act of resistance against Western ambivalence towards Islamic identity, and the "belly shirt" an act of resistance against patriarchal society's narrow views of female sexuality. Both were regarded as valid forms of self-expression.

== Timeline ==
=== 1990s ===
Date	Event
1990	Publication of Judith Butler, Gender Trouble.
1990	Publication of Naomi Wolf, The Beauty Myth.
1991	Riot grrrl movement begins in Olympia, Washington and Washington, D.C. in the US.
March 1991	In R v R, the House of Lords in the UK rules that a marital rape exemption does not exist in English law.
March 1991	In United Automobile Workers v. Johnson Controls, Inc., the US Supreme Court declares that employers cannot exclude women from jobs in which exposure to toxic substances could harm a developing fetus.
May 1991	Release of the film Thelma and Louise: "It took all those feelings of alienation and anger—which until that point had mostly found expression in things like 'Take Back the Night' rallies—and turned them into something rebellious, transgressive, iconic, punk rock and mainstream." – Carina Chocano, New York Times.
31 July 1991	The US Senate votes overwhelmingly to open combat positions for women aviators.
1991	Susan Faludi publishes Backlash: The Undeclared War Against American Women.
July 1991	Clarence Thomas Supreme Court nomination and the televised testimony in October of Anita Hill that he had sexually harassed her.
October 1991	"Opportunity 2000" is launched in the UK to increase women's employment opportunities.
January 1992	In response to the Thomas nomination, American feminist Rebecca Walker publishes "Becoming the Third Wave" in Ms. magazine.
1992	Four women enter the US Senate to join the two already there, lending 1992 the label "Year of the Woman" in the US.
1992	Third Wave Direct Action Corporation (later Third Wave Foundation and the Third Wave Fund) founded in the US by Rebecca Walker and Shannon Liss-Riordan to support young activists; organized Freedom Ride 1992, a nationwide bus tour to register voters.
1993	Family and Medical Leave Act becomes law in the US.
1993	Janet Reno nominated and confirmed as the first female US Attorney General after President Bill Clinton's previous choices, Zoë Baird and Kimba Wood, fail because of Nannygate.
1993	"Take Our Daughters to Work Day" debuts in the US to build girls' self-esteem and open their eyes to a variety of career possibilities for women. It was later renamed Take Our Daughters and Sons to Work Day.
1993	First edition of Bust magazine appears, founded by Laurie Henzel, Marcelle Karp, and Debbie Stoller.
1994	Women taking back the word bitch are helped by the single "All Women Are Bitches" by the all-woman Canadian band Fifth Column.
1994	Criminal Justice and Public Order Act 1994 confirms that marital rape is illegal in the UK.
1994	Violence Against Women Act becomes law in the US and establishes the Office on Violence Against Women.
1995	Publication of Rebecca Walker (ed.), To Be Real: Telling the Truth and Changing the Face of Feminism.
1995	Fourth World Conference on Women held in China.
1996	Northern Ireland Women's Coalition founded.
1996	Feminist play The Vagina Monologues, by American playwright Eve Ensler, premieres in New York.
1996	In United States v. Virginia, the US Supreme Court rules that male-only admissions policy of state-supported Virginia Military Institute violates the Fourteenth Amendment.
1996	First edition of the magazine Bitch: Feminist Response to Pop Culture appears.
1997	Publication of Leslie Heywood and Jennifer Drake (eds.), Third Wave Agenda: Being Feminist, Doing Feminism.
1997	Turkish feminist Şenal Sarıhan shared the Robert F. Kennedy Human Rights Award.
1997	Layli Miller-Muro founds the Tahirih Justice Center in the US following Matter of Kasinga, an asylum case dealing with female genital mutilation.
1998	Eve Ensler and others, including Willa Shalit, a producer of the Westside Theatre production of The Vagina Monologues, launch V-Day, a global non-profit movement that raises over $75 million for women's anti-violence groups.
1999	Publication of Germaine Greer, The Whole Woman
1999	Publication of Marcelle Karp and Debbie Stoller (eds.), The BUST Guide to the New Girl Order.
1999	Publication of Elizabeth Wurtzel, Bitch: In Praise of Difficult Women.
1999	Publication of Carol Ann Duffy, The World's Wife

=== 2000s ===
Date	Event
2000	Publication of Jennifer Baumgardner and Amy Richards, Manifesta: Young Women, Feminism, and the Future
October 2000	CBS agrees to pay $8 million to settle a sex discrimination lawsuit on behalf of 200 women.
2001	The Isle of Man passes its first sex-discrimination bill.
2001	Condoleezza Rice becomes the first female US national security adviser.
2004	The March for Women's Lives is held in Washington, D.C., to support the right to abortion, access to birth control, scientifically accurate sex education, and prevention and treatment of sexually transmitted infections, and to show public support for mothers and children.
2004	Asylum Gender Guidelines are introduced by the UK for female asylum seekers.
2004	Publication of Vivien Labaton and Dawn Lundy (eds.), The Fire This Time: Young Activists and the New Feminism.
2004	Start of Feministing blog by Jessica Valenti and Vanessa Valenti.
2005	Ellen Johnson Sirleaf in Liberia becomes Africa's first elected woman leader and the first black female president in the world.
2005	Angela Merkel becomes Germany's first female chancellor.
2007	Nancy Pelosi becomes the first woman Speaker in the US Congress.
1 April 2007	The Gender Equality Duty of the Equality Act 2006 comes into effect in the UK. It requires public authorities "to promote equality of opportunity between women and men".
2007	Publication of Jessica Valenti, Full Frontal Feminism: A Young Woman's Guide to Why Feminism Matters.
2007	Publication of Julia Serrano, Whipping Girl: A Transsexual Woman on Feminism and the Scapegoating of Femininity
2008	Publication of Jaclyn Friedman and Jessica Valenti (eds.), Yes Means Yes.
2008	Norway requires of all companies that at least 40 percent of their board members be women.
May 2008	In Los Angeles, Diana Bijon's husband, Michael, takes her last name upon marriage, after their lawsuit led to a new California state law guaranteeing the rights of married couples and registered domestic partners to choose whichever last name they prefer.
2008	Forced Marriage (Civil Protection) Act 2007 comes into force in the UK.
2009	In the UK, Carol Ann Duffy becomes the first female Poet Laureate.
3 April 2011	First SlutWalk takes place in Toronto in response to Toronto police officer Michael Sanguinetti's statement that "women should avoid dressing like sluts in order not to be victimized".

== Bibliography ==
- Chamberlain, Prudence (2017). The feminist fourth wave : affective temporality. Springer. ISBN 9783319536828.
- Evans, Elizabeth (2015). The Politics of Third Wave Feminisms: Neoliberalism, Intersectionality, and the State in Britain and the US. London: Palgrave Macmillan. ISBN 978-1-137-29527-9.
- Gillis, Stacy; Howie, Gillian; Munford, Rebecca (2007). Third Wave Feminism: A Critical Exploration (Revised ed.). Palgrave Macmillan. ISBN 978-1-4039-1821-5.
- Henry, Astrid (2004). Not My Mother's Sister: Generational Conflict and Third-Wave Feminism. Bloomington: Indiana University Press. ISBN 978-0-253-21713-4. OCLC 53932637.
- Baumgardner, Jennifer; Richards, Amy (2000). Manifesta: Young Women, Feminism, and the Future. New York: Farrar, Straus and Giroux. ISBN 978-0-374-52622-1.
- Newman, Jacquetta A.; White, Linda Ann (2012). Women, Politics, and Public Policy: The Political Struggles of Canadian Women (2nd ed.). Toronto: Oxford University Press. ISBN 9780195432497.
- Snyder, R. Claire (1 September 2008). "What Is Third-Wave Feminism? A New Directions Essay". Signs: Journal of Women in Culture and Society. 34 (1): 175–196. doi:10.1086/588436. ISSN 0097-9740. JSTOR 10.1086/588436. S2CID 144068546.

== Suggested listening ==
- Bikini Kill - The C.D. Version of the First Two Records (Kill Rock Stars) (1994)
- Heavens to Betsy - Calculated (Kill Rock Stars) (1992)
- Huggy Bear - Our Troubled Youth EP [appears on the Yeah Yeah Yeah Yeah split LP with Bikini Kill] (Kill Rock Stars) (1993)
- Alanis Morissette - Jagged Little Pill (Maverick/Reprise) (1995)
- Liz Phair - Exile in Guyville (Matador) (1993)
