= Marianne Schnall =

American writer, interviewer, and feminist

Marianne Schnall is an American writer, interviewer, and feminist. Her interviews with Madeleine Albright, Dr. Jane Goodall, Gloria Steinem, Jane Fonda, Eve Ensler and others have been published by several magazines and websites, and she has published four books about feminism.

Schnall founded the not-for-profit website Feminist.com in 1995 and What Will It Take in 2017.

== Feminist.com ==
Marianne Schnall founded Feminist.com in 1995 to foster "awareness, education, and activism for women" by providing "information dedicated to women's equality, justice, wellness and safety."

Feminist.com has helped many non-profits get started on the internet and still supports those non-profits. The following non-profit organization were previously hosted on Feminist.com: Black Women in Sisterhood for Action (BISA); Center for Women's Global Leadership; Equality Now; Girls Inc.; Hollywood Women's Political Committee (defunct); Mothers and Others for a Livable Planet (defunct); Ms. Foundation for Women; National Committee on Pay Equity; National Women's Political Caucus; National Women's Studies Association; 9to5 - National Association of Working Women; Rape, Abuse and Incest National Network (RAINN); Sisterhood is Global; Third Wave; Voters for Choice; Washington Feminist Faxnet (defunct); Women's International Network; Women's Vote Project (defunct); Women's Campaign Fund; and V-Day.

Feminist.com partnered with the following organizations: Amnesty International; Center for New Words; Equality Now; Feminist Majority Foundation; Girls Leadership Institute; MomsRising.org; Men Can Stop Rape; New Moon: The Magazine for Girls and Their Dreams; Nobel Women's Initiative; Omega Institute; Political Parity; Rape, Abuse & Incest National Network (RAINN); The White House Project; The Women's Media Center; V-Day; Women’s eNews; Women's Media Center; Women for Women International; World Pulse; and Younger Women's Task Force.

== What Will It Take ==
Marianne Schnall founded What Will It Take on International Women's Day in 2017 as a "media, collaboration, learning, and social engagement platform that inspires, connects, educates and engages women everywhere to advance in all levels of leadership and take action." The website also includes resources regarding political leadership, business leadership, media representation, philanthropy and investing, young women and girls leadership, civic engagement, and sports.

What Will It Take has five major initiatives:

- Workplace Equity, "which strives to create a culture of respect, equity, and value for all"
- Women & Money, "a platform for action to mobilize more women and feminist men to invest and fund gender lens initiatives"
- Women & Politics, which aims to "bridge the political divide and achieve parity in politics"
- Women & Media, "which strives to raise awareness about the lack of women in media and to find ways to increase women’s representation throughout the industry"
- Women & Sports, "which strives to raise awareness about the array of cultural and institutional barriers women face as they continue to level the playing field throughout the sports system"

== Bibliography ==
What Will It Take to Make A Woman President?: Conversations About Women, Leadership and Power features interviews with politicians, public officials, thought leaders, writers, artists, and activists in an attempt to discover the obstacles that have held women back and what needs to change in order to elect a woman into the White House. With insights and personal anecdotes from Sheryl Sandberg, Maya Angelou, Gloria Steinem, Nancy Pelosi, Nicholas Kristof, Melissa Etheridge, Olympia Snowe, and many more, What Will It Take to Make A Woman President? addresses timely, provocative issues involving women, politics, and power.

=== Books ===
- Daring to Be Ourselves: Influential Women Share Insights on Courage, Happiness, and Finding Your Own Voice, 2010, Blue Mountain Arts.
- What Will It Take to Make A Woman President?: Conversations About Women, Leadership and Power, 2013, Seal Press.
  - Named a top ten book on the Amelia Bloomer Book List (2014)
- Dare to Be You: Inspirational Advice for Girls on Finding Your Voice, Leading Fearlessly, and Making a Difference, 2019, Tiller Press.
- Leading the Way: Inspiring Words for Women on How to Live and Lead with Courage, Confidence, and Authenticity, 2019, Tiller Press.

=== Essays ===
- "Cyberfeminism: Networking the Net" with Amy Richards, published in Sisterhood Is Forever: The Women's Anthology for a New Millennium, edited by Robin Morgan, 2003, Washington Square Press.

=== News Articles ===
- "2018 will be the year of women." December 15, 2017, CNN.
- "10 Quotes To Inspire You This Women’s Equality Day." August 26, 2017, HuffPost.

=== Interviews ===
- "Exclusive Insights From Four TEDWomen Speakers: Featuring Luvvie Ajayi, Justin Baldoni, Susan David and Sally Kohn." December 5, 2017, HuffPost.
- "From #MeToo to Men Too: How Men Can Prevent Harassment and Abuse." November 11, 2017, HuffPost.
- "Moby, Russell Simmons And Others Speak Out On An Issue That Needs Our Immediate Attention." July 24, 2017, HuffPost.
