= Bust (magazine) =

American women's lifestyle magazine founded in 1993

- Editor-in-Chief: Tara Finley
- Categories: Feminism
- Frequency: Quarterly
- Publisher: Erin Domash
- Founder: Debbie Stoller, Laurie Henzel, and Marcelle Karp
- Founded: 1993
- Company: Street Media, LLC
- Country: United States
- Based in: New York City
- Language: English
- Website: bust.com
- ISSN: 1089-4713

Bust is a women's lifestyle magazine that is published four times a year. The magazine was started in 1993 by Debbie Stoller and Marcelle Karp, with Laurie Henzel coming on as partner in 1994. It is currently published by Street Media LLC. Bust covers music, news, crafts, art, sex, and fashion from an independent ("indie"), third-wave feminist perspective. The magazine's slogan is "For women with something to get off their chest."

== Content ==
In the book titled Girl Culture: An Encyclopedia Volume 1, Miranda Campbell wrote a section on Bust and its features, including "Real Life: Crafts, Cooking, Home and Hearth" which encourages readers to make their own items instead of buying them, "Fashion and Booty" which suggests clothing, accessories, and other novelty items readers might be interested in purchasing, and articles on car maintenance featuring auto technician Lucille Treganowan. BUST magazine promotes a balance of contributing to consumerism as well as encouragement of independence from consumerism. The magazine also features articles on issues about sex in which they encourage women to embrace their sexuality and each issue also includes an erotic short story.

Many mainstream and indie actors, directors, comedians, and musicians have appeared on the cover.

== History ==
Bust was founded in New York City in 1993 by Stoller (using the alias "Celina Hex"), and Marcelle Karp (using the alias "Betty Boob"). The duo founded BUST after meeting at Nickelodeon; they wanted to create a positive and outspoken women's magazine for their generation. "Our intention," Stoller said, "was to start a magazine that would be a real alternative to Vogue, Cosmo, Mademoiselle, and Glamour, something that was as fierce and as funny and as pro-female as the women we knew." She said the women she knew who read the Cosmos of the world "always ended up feeling bad afterward. They support very stereotypical ideas about women." BUST started off as a zine, with Stoller, and Karp photocopying, stapling, and distributing the issues themselves after work and on weekends. Henzel was brought on as a partner in 1994. Karp left in 2001.

Stoller named the magazine Bust because she wanted a name that was "provocative, funny, and also sexy."

Bust won a Firecracker Alternative Book Award in the 'Zine category in 1997.

Bust was purchased by Razorfish Studios in August 2000. One year later, after September 11, Razorfish Studios went out of business. Stoller and Henzel later bought Bust back from Razorfish Studios. Bust was purchased by Street Media, LLC in 2022.

== Events ==
Bust sponsored the Holiday Craftacular, an annual craft fair in New York City that began in December 2005, and added a Spring Fling Craftacular in 2008.

On July 25, 2013 Bust held 'The Bust Magazine 20th Anniversary Extravaganza' in Brooklyn, New York. To commemorate the magazine's 20th anniversary, they held the 'Golden Bra Awards'.

== DIY Guide To Life ==
Stoller and Henzel are the authors of Bust's DIY Guide to Life, consisting of more than 250 of the best DIY projects from the magazine's then 15 years of publication. There are guides for a wide range of things from gardening, to weddings, and sex projects, organized by category.

== The Bust Guide to the New Girl Order ==
Stoller and Karp are the authors of The Bust Guide to the New Girl Order which was published on August 1, 1999, by Penguin Books. The book has eight topics on female issues and includes the best writings from the magazine. There are essays about girls' culture, such as women in media, sex, fashion, growing up, and relationships with boys.
