= Amy Richards =

American writer, feminist, and art historian (born 1970)

- Born: February 9, 1970 (age 56); Alexandria, Virginia, U.S.
- Occupations: Activist, writer, organizer, feminist, art historian
- Writing career
- Genres: Books, magazine articles
- Subjects: Feminism, parenthood

Amelia Richards (born February 9, 1970) is an American activist, organizer, writer, television producer, feminist, and art historian, currently residing in New York. She produced the Emmy-nominated series Woman, which airs on Viceland. She is the president of Soapbox, Inc., a feminist lecture agency.

== Early life ==
Richards was born on February 9, 1970, in Alexandria, Virginia, to Albert Wentz and Karen Richards. She grew up in Pennsylvania. Her father, Wentz, was not a part of her life. She attended Tabor Academy, a private boarding school in Marion, Massachusetts. After graduating high school from Tabor, she graduated cum laude from Barnard College with a Bachelor of Arts in Art History in 1992. She was an NCAA Division I soccer player at Barnard. She is also a four-time marathon runner.

== Career ==
Richards became involved in a summer project, Freedom Summer '92, a cross-country voter registration drive. She co-wrote Manifesta: Young Women, Feminism, and the Future with Jennifer Baumgardner. The book was published by Farrar, Straus and Giroux in 2000 with an anniversary and updated edition published in 2010. She authored Opting In: Having a Child Without Losing Yourself, about feminism and motherhood, and is a co-author of Grassroots: A Field Guide for Feminist Activism. She wrote Insight Guides: Shopping in New York City. She also wrote the article "LIVES; When One is Enough", about her experience becoming pregnant with triplets, and deciding to terminate two of them, giving birth to the third. She and Marianne Schnall contributed the piece "Cyberfeminism: Networking the Net" to the 2003 anthology Sisterhood Is Forever: The Women's Anthology for a New Millennium, edited by Robin Morgan. Her writing has appeared in The Nation, The LA Times, Bust, Ms., and numerous anthologies, including Listen Up, Body Outlaws and Catching A Wave. She has tackled issues ranging from plastic surgery to abortion politics. She was the interim project director for Twilight: Los Angeles by Anna Deavere Smith. She is also the editor of I Still Believe Anita Hill, a collection of essays featuring Eve Ensler, Catharine MacKinnon, Lynn Nottage and others.

She is the voice to "Ask Amy", an online advice column she has run at feminist.com since 1995. She produced Viceland's Woman, as well as being a consulting producer for Gloria Steinem: In Her Own Words for HBO and an advisor on MAKERS: Women Making America, a PBS documentary on the women's movement.

Richards is a co-founder of the Third Wave Foundation, which is now known as the Third Wave Fund, a national organization for young feminist activists between the ages of 15 and 30. The Third Wave Fund co-founded by Richards promotes gender justice, a movement to end patriarchy, transphobia, homophobia, and misogyny.

In July 2002, she co-founded and became president of Soapbox Inc., an organization based on feminism. She served as a cultural attaché to the U.S. Embassy in Russia, consulting on women’s issues. She has been a long-time consultant to Gloria Steinem and Anna Deavere Smith, as well as the Columbia School of Public Health among other places. She serves on the boards and advisory boards of organizations such as Sadie Nash Leadership Project and Chicken & Egg Productions, feminist.com, Ms. Magazine, and Fair Fund. She is an abortion rights activist, having terminated the pregnancy of her twins within a pregnancy where she was expecting triplets.

== Books ==
- Baumgardner, Jennifer; Amy Richards (2000). ManifestA: Young Women, Feminism, and the Future. New York: Farrar, Straus and Giroux. ISBN 978-0-374-52622-1.
- Baumgardner, Jennifer; Amy Richards (2005). Grassroots: A Field Guide for Feminist Activism. New York: Farrar, Straus and Giroux.
- Richards, Amy (2008). Opting In: Having a Child Without Losing Yourself. New York: Farrar, Straus and Giroux. ISBN 978-0-374-22672-5.
