= Jennifer Baumgardner =

Feminist writer most known for third-wave feminism

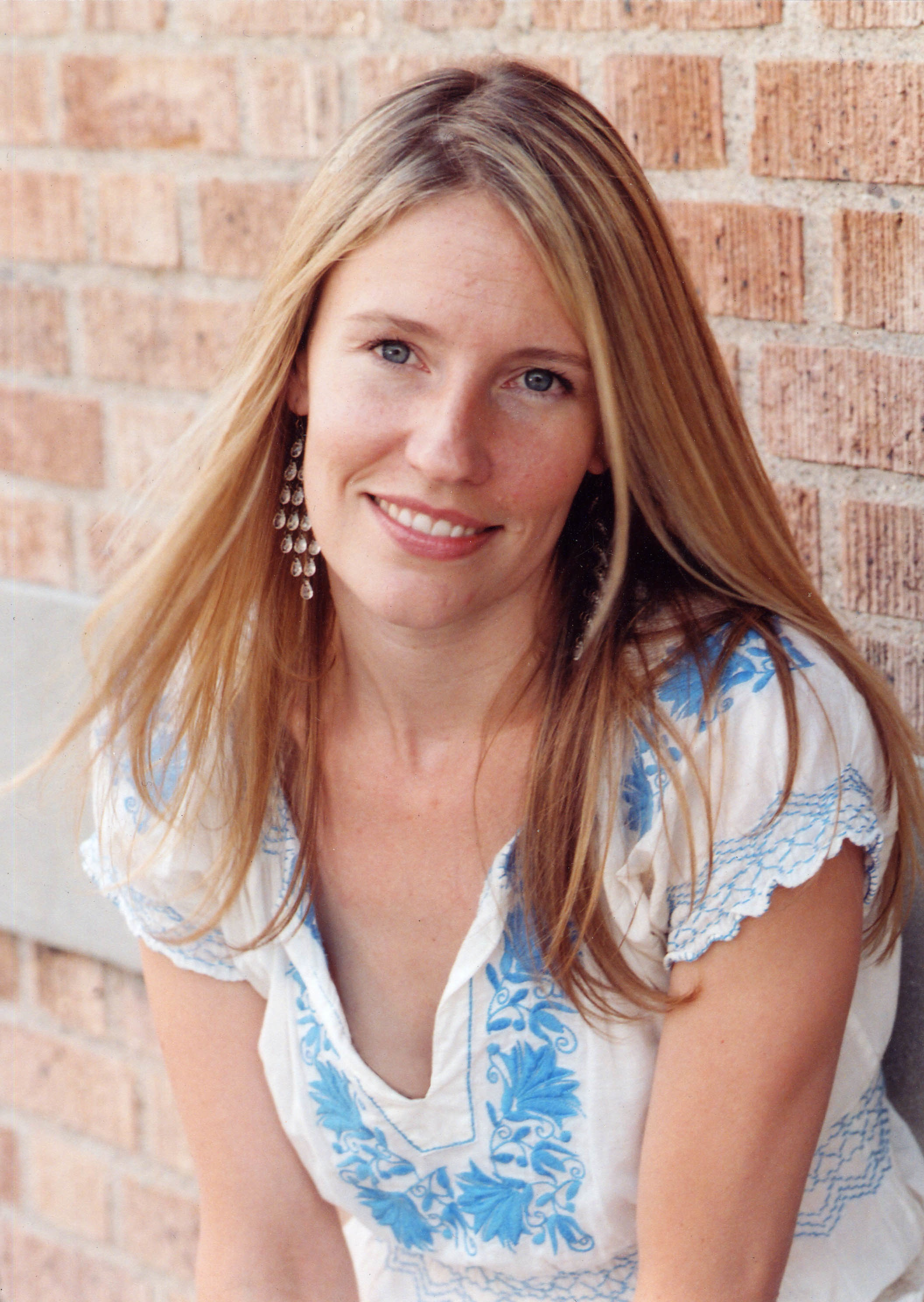
- Born: 1970 (age 55–56); Fargo, North Dakota, United States
- Occupations: Author, journalist, film producer, cultural critic, activist, and public speaker
- Writing career
- Period: Late 20th/early 21st century
- Genres: Books, magazine articles, documentary films
- Subjects: Feminism, third wave feminism, bisexuality, single parenthood, sex, rape, abortion
- Notable works: ManifestA: Young Women, Feminism and the Future
- Literary movement: Third wave feminism
- Website: jenniferbaumgardner.net

Jennifer Baumgardner (born 1970) is a feminist writer whose work explores abortion, sex, bisexuality, rape, single parenthood, and women's power. From 2013 to 2017, she served as the Executive Director/Publisher at The Feminist Press at the City University of New York (CUNY), the press founded by Florence Howe in 1970.

She is most known for her contribution to the development of third-wave feminism.

== Early and personal life ==
Baumgardner grew up in Fargo, North Dakota, the middle of three daughters. She attended Lawrence University in Appleton, Wisconsin, graduating in 1992. While at Lawrence, she helped organize an anti-war "Guerrilla Theater," led a feminist group on campus, and co-founded an alternative newspaper called The Other that focused on intersectional issues of liberation. She moved to New York City after graduation and in 1993 began working as an unpaid intern for Ms. magazine. By 1997 she had become the youngest editor at Ms.

While working at Ms., Baumgardner fell in love with a female intern, Anastasia. They broke up in 1996, but the relationship inspired her to write the memoir Look Both Ways: Bisexual Politics. In 1997 she began dating Amy Ray of the Indigo Girls; the couple broke up in 2002.

== Mid life ==
Baumgardner left Ms. in 1998 and began writing independently for magazines and news organizations, including the New York Times and NPR. She has since written for numerous magazines, including Glamour, The Nation, Babble, More, and Maxim. Her books include Manifesta: Young Women, Feminism and the Future, Grassroots: A Field Guide for Feminist Activism written with Amy Richards, and Look Both Ways: Bisexual Politics. In 2004 she produced the documentary film Speak Out: I Had an Abortion, which tells the story of ten women's abortion experiences from the 1920s to the present, including the reproductive justice architect Loretta Ross, feminist and journalist Gloria Steinem, and activist Florence Rice. She has written about purity balls (rituals celebrating virginity), Catholic hospitals taking over secular ones and eliminating their reproductive services, (Note: Baumgardner, Jennifer (January 7, 1999). "Immaculate Contraception". The Nation.) rape, and breastfeeding her friend's son. (Note: Baumgardner, Jennifer (January 22, 2007). "Breast Friends". Babble.)

Baumgardner's work has been featured on shows from The Oprah Winfrey Show to NPR's Talk of the Nation, as well as in the New York Times, BBC News Hour, Bitch, and various other venues. In 2003, the Commonwealth Club of California hailed her in their centennial year as one of six "Visionaries for the 21st Century," commenting that "in her role as author and activist, [Jennifer has] permanently changed the way people think about feminism...and will shape the next 100 years of politics and culture."

== Contribution to Third Wave Feminism ==
Through public appearances, books, articles, and film, Baumgardner promoted a positive, matter-of-fact, and accessible approach to speaking publicly about controversial issues—which she referred to as "common-but-silenced"—such as abortion, rape, and sexuality. Called "dependably attentive to the gray areas around divisive issues," this "simple" approach also elicits criticism of her work from feminists and other who find her "off-puttingly naive". In her 2009 collection of essays entitled F 'em: Goo Goo, Gaga, and Some Thoughts on Balls, Baumgardner described the Third Wave she helped to define and represent:

The Third Wave grew out of an enormous cultural shift. By the late 1980s, a cohort of women and men who'd been raised with the gains, theories, flaws, and backlash of the feminist movement were beginning to come of age. Whether or not these individual men and women were raised by self-described feminists—or called themselves feminists—they were living feminist lives: Females were playing sports and running marathons, taking charge of their sex lives, being educated in greater numbers than men, running for office, and working outside the home. For those who were consciously feminist, the splits of the 1980s formed the architecture of their theories. Kimberlé Crenshaw's description of "intersectionality" drew on the work of the Combahee River Collective and advanced the idea that gender might be just one of many entry points for feminism.

The Third Wave rejected the idea of a shared political priority list or even a set of issues one must espouse to be feminist. It inherited critiques of sexist dominant culture (having grown up in a feminist-influenced civilization) and embraced and created pop culture that supported women, from Queen Latifah to bell hooks to Riot Grrrl. Girlie feminists created magazines and fashion statements (and complicated the idea of what a feminist might look like). Sex positivity undermined the notion that porn and sex work are inherently demeaning, and revealed a glimpse of the range of potential sexual expression.

== Overview of major works ==
=== Manifesta: Young Women, Feminism, and the Future (2000) ===
On October 4, 2000 Baumgardner and Amy Richards published their first co-authored book Manifesta: Young Women, Feminism and the Future. Speaking directly to young third wave feminists, Baumgardner and Richards wrote the book to inspire women of the current generation to consciously embrace the liberation of today while remembering the work of previous feminist generations, writing:

Consciousness among women is what caused this [change], and consciousness, one's ability to open their (sic) mind to the fact that male domination does affect the women of our generation, is what we need... The presence of feminism in our lives is taken for granted. For our generation, feminism is like fluoride. We scarcely notice we have it—it's simply in the water.

Prologue: A Day Without Feminism In the prologue of Manifesta, the two authors recall the most vital achievements of women's liberation, which can be credited to the 2nd Wave of Feminists of the 1960s, 70s and 80s. Both of the authors, Baumgardner and Richards, were profoundly influenced by feminism from an early age, as both of their mothers took part in consciousness-raising groups, and Baumgardner's went even further to participate in the staged laundry strikes. So both of these authors are asking the audience to figuratively jump on a time machine and go back to the 1970s for a day. The purpose of this is to see exactly what the 2nd Wave feminists have succeeded in changing in a male-dominant patriarchal society, and what so many now take for granted - including the 3rd Wave feminists.

Throughout the book the authors traces feminism's evolution from the First Wave suffragette movement to the Third Wave feminism of today, all the while encouraging readers to continue the feminist fight of previous generations.

Who are feminists and what is feminism?

Baumgardner and Richards ask the fundamental but often overlooked questions, "who are the feminists?" and "what is feminism?" They cut to the foundational questions framing contemporary and past feminist movements in order to expose the stereotypes, inaccuracies, or misconceptions that derail and devalue the movement. This goal not only contributes to an established canon of third-wave feminist literature, but also makes the movement more appealing to young women who are misled by negative or stereotypical media and popular culture representations of feminism. They start with foundational definitions of what feminism means to them, invoking politically and socially conscious women and men. They clarify that there is no one formal alliance composed of "the feminists," but instead, feminism is a fluid alliance among individual citizens. This definition displays the differences between how a movement may appear on the surface—cohesive and homogeneous—and how it actually is internally. This disparity may be positive, and lend weight to feminist struggles, but it may also be negative, when the movement as a whole is judged based on the actions of one or a few individual(s). The authors argue that the latter disparity demonstrates the oppressed status of women and feminist activists, as a whole group is easily reduced to one or a few individuals, particularly in media, which disseminates this incomplete illusion.

The authors use matter of fact language to address their next question: what exactly is feminism? Feminism is not only a movement for social, political, and economic equality among men and women, but also requires the freedom to access information and education. Race and ethnicity are key to the modern feminist movement. This natural partnership also invokes the fight for gay rights. Feminism involves men and women of diverse ethnicities and sexual orientations united with the goal to liberate all individuals. It is a movement with the very clear goals of social and political change. This change is epitomized by engagement with government and the law, in addition to broader societal norms and practices. Beyond this foundational definition of feminism, there exists ample elasticity for women to define feminism according to their personal experiences. Because the lived experiences of women are so diverse, feminism itself must accommodate for these differences.

However, because of this fluidity, some modern women in prominent leadership positions have uneasy public relationships with feminism. The authors cite the example of G. E. executive Sam Allison, who sits on the board of The Women's Center in Milwaukee, and claims that she is not a feminist, she is just an "advocate to end violence against women." The modern-day example would be Facebook COO Sheryl Sandberg proclaiming that her book, Lean In, "is not a feminist manifesto — okay, it is sort of a feminist manifesto" (Hoedel, 2013, para. 10). These are two examples of the authors' assertions that issues separated from their feminist roots become depoliticized, and the fundamental causes of a particular societal problem are obscured. For example, the problem for Sandberg is an absence of women "leaning in" to positions of workplace leadership. This and other issues of economic development need to unequivocally identified as feminist issues in order to be dealt with equitably and effectively.

=== Grassroots: A Field Guide for Feminist Activism (2004) ===
After the critical and commercial success of Manifesta Baumgardner co-authored another book with Amy Richards entitled Grassroots: A Field Guide for Feminist Activism which was published in January, 2005. The purpose of the book was to provide a "handbook" for social activism and to help readers answer the social justice question: What can I do? Based on the authors' own experiences, and the stories of both the large number of activists they work with as well as the countless everyday people they have encountered over the years, Grassroots encourages people to move beyond the "generic three" (check writing, contacting congressional representatives, and volunteering) and make a difference with clear guidelines and models for activism. The authors draw heavily on individual stories as examples, inspiring readers to recognize the tools right in front of them—be it the office copier or the family living room—in order to make change. Activism is accessible to all, and Grassroots shows how anyone, no matter how much or little time they have to offer, can create a world that more clearly reflects their values.

=== Look Both Ways: Bisexual Politics (2007) ===
On February 20, 2007, Baumgardner published Look Both Ways: Bisexual Politics, the first book written without Amy Richards. In Look Both Ways, Baumgardner takes a close look at the growing visibility of gay and bisexual characters, performers, and issues on the national cultural stage. Despite the prevalence of bisexuality among Generation X and Y women, she finds that it continues to be marginalized by both gay and straight cultures, and dismissed either as a phase or a cop-out. Woven in between her cultural commentary, Baumgardner discusses her own experience as a bisexual, and the struggle she's undergone to reconcile the privilege she's garnered as a woman who is perceived as straight and the empowerment and satisfaction she's derived from her relationships with women.

The book was both embraced, and was a finalist for the Lambda Literary Award for Bisexual Literature.

=== Abortion & Life (2008) ===
In October 2008, Baumgardner published Abortion & Life (Akashic), which attempted to reckon with the unease that even people within pro-choice circles feel about abortion with personal portraits, chapters on history, and an assertion that one could be pro-life and a feminist. Noted for its candor and lack of defensiveness about abortions: "abortion is the result, not the cause, of social problems."

== Activism ==
=== Soapbox, Inc. Speakers Who Speak Out ===
Soapbox, Inc. is a non-profit feminist organization started by Baumgardner and Amy Richards in 2002. Baumgardner and Richards formed the organization with the purpose of providing a national platform for spreading their activist message. Since its creation in 2002 Soapbox, Inc. has come to represent dozens of authors, scholars, speakers, and artists at the forefront of feminist politics, and has developed a client base of more than 500 schools and organizations, including Planned Parenthood, St. Thomas University, Unitarian Universalist Association, University of Pennsylvania, and Shoreline Community College.

In 2007, they devised a way of "bringing the campus to the speakers" with Soapbox Feminist Boot Camps. These week-long intensives immerse participants (of all ages and genders) in the practice of feminism and exposes the myriad of issues, approaches, organizations, and individuals that are the lifeblood of the movement. Currently these boot camps are the largest feminist immersion programs in the country.

=== The "I Had an Abortion" Project (2004) ===
In 2004, Baumgardner created the "I Had an Abortion" project. The campaign included t-shirts that said "I had an abortion," a film (made with Gillian Aldrich) documenting women's stories of abortion, a book, and a photo exhibit. The film features ten different women—including Loretta Ross and Gloria Steinem—openly speaking about their abortion experiences spanning over seven decades from the years prior to Roe v. Wade to present day.

On the "I Had an Abortion" film website Baumgardner writes about her involvement with the campaign, saying:

Frustration with the yelling and the lack of personal stakes in reporting on this issue led me to want to approach it only personally—get right to the women and their stories, their faces and their lives, and get away from their political opinions. Thus, this is a pro-abortion rights project that is most concerned with creating space for women and men to speak honestly about their lives and their abortion experiences.

=== The "It Was Rape" Project (2008) ===
After the success of the "I Had an Abortion" campaign Baumgardner began the "I Was Raped" project in 2008. She later changed the name to "It was Rape." Modeled after the 2004 abortion campaign, the project encouraged men and women to "come out" about their experiences with sexual assault, and included the production and distribution of "I was raped" t-shirts and a 2013 film, It Was Rape, documenting the stories of individuals who had experienced sexual assault in their lifetimes.

In a 2008 interview with Scarleteen, Baumgardner spoke about the campaign, remarking "The goal of this project is to add nuance to the cultural conversation around rape. The reality of rape is more subtle than the preconceptions suggest. The act of rape—as well as the emotions and reactions of the raped—fall somewhere outside of the black-and-white roles of perpetrator and victim. The current things we have in place for justice are also inadequate, since the vast majority of rape victims don't want to or choose not to press charges. The aim of this documentary is to highlight these issues, as well as to give rape survivors a voice."

== Personal life ==
Baumgardner was married from 2010 to 2025. She lives in New York City with her two sons.

Baumgardner served as writer-in-residence at The New School (2008–12), executive director of the Feminist Press at CUNY (2013–17), and editor in chief of the Women’s Review of Books at Wellesley (2018–22).

Baumgardner is the publisher of Dottir Press, a woman-owned feminist imprint founded in 2017 that produces works by and about feminism and publishes LIBER: A Feminist Review.

She is currently writer-in-residence at Smith College.

== Selected bibliography ==
Books

- Baumgardner, Jennifer; Richards, Amy (2000). ManifestA: Young Women, Feminism, and the Future. New York: Farrar, Straus and Giroux. ISBN 978-0-374-52622-1.
- ——; Richards, Amy (2005). Grassroots: A Field Guide for Feminist Activism. New York: Farrar, Straus and Giroux. ISBN 978-0-374-52865-2.
- —— (2007). Look Both Ways: Bisexual Politics. New York: Farrar, Straus and Giroux. ISBN 978-0-374-19004-0.
- —— (2008). Abortion & Life. New York: Akashic Books, Akashic Books. ISBN 978-1-933354-59-0.
- —— (2011). F 'em!: Goo Goo, Gaga, and Some Thoughts on Balls. California: Seal Press, Seal Press. ISBN 978-1-58005-360-0.
- Baumgardner, Jennifer; Kunin, Madeleine M.. (2013). We Do: American Leaders who Believe in Marriage Equality: Akashic Books. ISBN 978-1-61775-187-5

Films

- Speak Out: I Had an Abortion (2005) Co-Producer
- It Was Rape (2013) Director, Producer

Appeared in:

- The Punk Singer (2013) Self
- La bisexualité: tout un art? (2008) Self - Writer, New York
- 10 Years of Tomb Raider: A GameTap Retrospective (2008) Self
- The Righteous Babes (1998) Self

Articles

- Baumgardner, Jennifer (April 2015). "The Legacy of Campus Rape". More Magazine. Archived from the original on 2015-09-05.

== See also ==
- The left and feminism
- New social movements
- Third-wave feminism
