= LGBTQ romance =

Literature genre

LGBTQ romance is a genre within romance fiction focused on same-sex characters who fall in love and have a homosexual or homoromantic relationship. The genre has met with increasing acceptance and sales from the 1980s onward. Bussel, in Publishers Weekly, notes that as of 2020, presses that specialize in LGBTQ romance, mainstream publishers, and booksellers are expanding their offerings and inviting a more diverse authorship.

== M M romance genre ==
=== Term ===
This genre of gay romance was originally called "M/M Romance" (from slash fiction, meaning male-on-male not mass-market), but is now often called "M M Romance" or "mm romance", and features gay men falling in love.

The term was in use on fan fiction sites by 2004. By 2008, hundreds of such novels were being published.

=== History of genre ===
A 2009 article in the gay newspaper The Liberty Press stated that the genre was emerging: ""slash' fiction has been around for decades. Women were writing 'Kirk/Spock' romances long before the Internet even existed. But up to now, none has been published by mainstream presses and stocked next to the bodice rippers." Also in 2009, the first mainstream review of a novel marketed as "an M/M Romance" appeared, announcing that "male/male romantic historical fiction is the newest publishing trend." In 2010, Rolling Stone Magazine and Out magazine named M/M romance one of the hottest developing literary trends. In 2011, Library Journal described the genre as "male-on-male, or M/M romance" and mentioned that it was "mostly written and read by straight women." It speculated that Queer as Folk and the 2005 Brokeback Mountain drove the genre's expansion but that its origins were "in the slash fiction genre of the 1990s in which erotic fiction about television, book, and movie characters found a lively audience online." Library Journal also noted that yaoi graphic narratives, popular with Japanese women since the 1980s, were an influence on the M/M genre.

Since January 2010, the genre of M/M Romance has tripled in Amazon's online Kindle Store.

Emerging from the margins, best-selling romance authors began to write M/M romance novels. The Lambda Literary Award for Gay Romance was first awarded in 2007. In 2015, M/M romances were nominated for RITAs for the first time.

=== Sub-genres ===
Some of the sub-niche categories are coming out, "gay-for-you" and "first-time gay." Some M/M romance novels feature transgender or asexual protagonists. Some feature Christian characters or are in the Amish romance genre. Some are m/m/f romance novels, featuring polyamory, pansexuality, and bisexuality.

=== Authors ===
Authors writing M/M Romance fiction in the early aught years include Victor J. Banis, Alex Beecroft, Rob Byrnes, Johnny Diaz, Erastes, and Marshall Thornton.

Later authors writing in this genre include Andre Aciman, Becky Albertalli, Jay Bell, Brad Boney, Jane Jensen, Rhys Ford, Andrew Sean Greer, Ginn Hale, Alexis Hall, Shaun David Hutchinson, T. J. Klune, Bill Konigsberg, Casey McQuiston, C. S. Pacat, Roan Parrish, Neil S. Plakcy, Rainbow Rowell, Paul Rudnick, Adam Silvera and Rachel Reid.

=== Publishers ===
Dreamspinner Press (founded in 2007), Less than Three (2009), Running Press, Loose Id (now closed), Carina Press, InterMix, MLR (ManLoveRomance), and Riptide Publishing (2011) were founded to publish gay romantic fiction almost exclusively. Others, such as Decadent Publishing (2010), began as traditional romance imprints and shifted their focuses toward inclusive pairings, including gay romance, in recent years.

=== Controversy ===
The majority of M/M romance novels are written by and for women. The issue of whether women should write books featuring gay men has been a frequent topic of popular and scholarly discussion. Foster suggests that the heteronormative assumption that the readership of this genre is completely straight might be inaccurate

== Lesbian romance genre ==
=== Term ===
This genre was originally called "Lesbian romance", but is now often called "FF romance" (meaning female/female), "Sapphic romance" or "WLW romance" (meaning women loving women)

=== History of genre ===
Lesbian romance is a genre within gay literature and romance fiction. Scholarship on this genre dates back to the 1980s, but only became common in the 1990s.

Scholars have defined the tropes of this genre: "Like the classic Greek romances, the themes of removal to a distant place, captivity, isolation, escape, search, and pursuit characterize the lesbian romance novel. Typically, the smooth progression of the budding romance is jeopardized by some obstacle to love. The subsequent separation or threat of separation stimulates the lovers' (and readers') concerns over whether the longed for union will be achieved. Once the pair overcome the age, class, or race barriers and is united, they supposedly live happily ever after."

=== Authors ===
Authors in this genre include Sarah Aldridge, Georgia Beers, Andrea Bramhall, Jae, Karin Kallmaker, Lori L. Lake, Beth Bernobich, Radclyffe, and Merry Shannon.

=== Publishers ===
Some publishing houses, such as Bella Books, Bold Strokes Books, Regal Crest Enterprises, and Spinsters Ink, focus on lesbian romance novels.
