= Lambda Literary Award for Lesbian Romance =

Annual literary award

- Awarded for: Literary award
- Sponsored by: Lambda Literary Foundation
- Date: Annual
- Website: lambdaliterary.org/awards/

The Lambda Literary Award for Lesbian Romance is an annual literary award, presented by the Lambda Literary Foundation, to a novel, novella, or short story collection "by a single author that focus on a central love relationship between two or more characters", not including anthologies. The submission guidelines mention several sub-genres are included, " including traditional, historical, gothic, Regency, and paranormal romance".

== Recipients ==
Year	Author	Work	Result	Ref.
2007	Georgia Beers	Fresh Tracks	Winner	
2007	Ronica Black	Wild Abandon	Finalist	
2007	Grace Lennox	Chance	Finalist	
2007	Karin Kallmaker	Finders Keepers	Finalist	
2007	Radclyffe	Turn Back Time	Finalist	
2008	KG MacGregor	Out of Love	Winner	
2008	Marianne K. Martin	For Now, for Always	Finalist	
2008	Gun Brooke	Sheridan's Fate	Finalist	
2008	Frankie J. Jones	The Road Home	Finalist	
2008	Radclyffe	When Dreams Tremble	Finalist	
2009	Karin Kallmaker	The Kiss That Counted	Winner	
2009	Catherine Friend	A Pirate's Heart	Finalist	
2009	Georgia Beers	Finding Home	Finalist	
2009	JLee Meyer	Hotel Liaison	Finalist	
2009	Radclyffe	The Lonely Hearts Club	Finalist	
2010	Colette Moody	The Sublime and Spirited Voyage of Original Sin	Winner	
2010	Carsen Taite	It Should Be a Crime	Finalist	
2010	Tracey Richardson	No Rules of Engagement	Finalist	
2010	Karin Kallmaker	Stepping Stone	Finalist	
2010	KG MacGregor	Worth Every Step	Finalist	
2011	Cate Culpepper	River Walker	Winner	
2011	Karin Kallmaker	Above Temptation	Finalist	
2011	Lindsey Stone	Awakening to Sunlight	Finalist	
2011	Ann Roberts	Beacon of Love	Finalist	
2011	Georgia Beers	Starting from Scratch	Finalist	
2012	Kenna White	Taken by Surprise	Winner	
2012	Robbi McCoy	For Me and My Gal	Finalist	
2012	Rebecca S. Buck	Ghosts of Winter	Finalist	
2012	Julie Cannon	Rescue Me	Finalist	
2012	Gerri Hill	Storms	Finalist	
2013	Yolanda Wallace	Month of Sundays	Winner	
2013	Kieran York	Appointment with a Smile	Finalist	
2013	Lesley Davis	Dark Wings Descending	Finalist	
2013	Ali Vali	Love Match	Finalist	
2013	Anne Laughlin	Runaway	Finalist	
2013	Trin Denise	She Left Me Breathless	Finalist	
2013	Yvonne Heidt	Sometime Yesterday	Finalist	
2013	Chris Paynter	Survived by Her Longtime Companion	Finalist	
2013	Lynette Mae	Tactical Pursuit	Finalist	
2013	Q. Kelly	Third	Finalist	
2014	Andrea Bramhall	Clean Slate	Winner	
2014	Lynn Ames	All That Lies Within	Finalist	
2014	Gerri Hill	At Seventeen	Finalist	
2014	D. Jordan Redhawk	Broken Trails	Finalist	
2014	Mason Dixon	Date with Destiny	Finalist	
2014	D. Jackson Leigh	Hold Me Forever	Finalist	
2014	Ann McMan and Salem West	Hoosier Daddy	Finalist	
2014	Tracey Richardson	Last Salute	Finalist	
2014	Karin Kallmaker	Love by the Numbers	Finalist	
2014	Neil Stark	The Princess Affair	Finalist	
2015	Robbi McCoy	The Farmer's Daughter	Winner	
2015	Lisa Girolami	The Heat of Angels	Finalist	
2015	Kris Bryant	Jolt	Finalist	
2015	Andrea Bramhall	Nightingale	Finalist	
2015	Jesse J. Thoma	Seneca Falls	Finalist	
2015	Marianne K. Martin	Tangled Roots	Finalist	
2016	Julie Blair	Making a Comeback	Winner	
2016	Shelley Thrasher	Autumn Spring	Finalist	
2016	Andrea Bramhall	The Chameleon's Tale	Finalist	
2016	Dillon Watson	Full Circle	Finalist	
2016	Rachel Spangler	Heart of the Game	Finalist	
2016	Jackie D	Infiltration	Finalist	
2016	Blythe H. Warren	My Best Friend's Girl	Finalist	
2016	Amy Dunne	The Renegade	Finalist	
2017	Virginia Hale	The Scorpion's Empress	Winner	
2017	Barbara Ann Wright	Coils	Finalist	
2017	Karma Kingsley	Finding Lizzie	Finalist	
2017	Lila Bruce	Little Lies	Finalist	
2017	Kiki Archer	Lost in the Starlight	Finalist	
2017	Susan Wittig Albert	Loving Eleanor	Finalist	
2017	Rachel Spangler	Perfect Pairing	Finalist	
2017	Marianne K. Martin	The Liberators of Willow Run	Finalist	
2018	Yolanda Wallace	Tailor-Made	Winner	
2018	Rachel Spangler	Close to Home	Finalist	
2018	Aurora Rey	Crescent City Confidential	Finalist	
2018	Ann McMan	Goldenrod	Finalist	
2018	Ann Roberts	Vagabond Heart	Finalist	
2018	Yoshiyuki Ly	Venus and Lysander	Finalist	
2018	Julie Cannon	Wishing on a Dream	Finalist	
2018	Karis Walsh	You Make Me Tremble	Finalist	
2019	Ann McMan	Beowulf for Cretins: A Love Story	Winner	
2019	Aurora Rey	Autumn's Light	Finalist	
2019	Erin Zak	Breaking Down Her Walls	Finalist	
2019	Jenny Frame	Charming the Vicar	Finalist	
2019	Rachel Spangler	In Development	Finalist	
2019	Jae	Just for Show	Finalist	
2019	Lola Keeley	The Music and the Mirror	Finalist	
2019	Sheri Lewis Wohl	The Talebearer	Finalist	
2020	Emily Noon	Aurora's Angel: A Dark Fantasy Romance	Winner	
2020	Erin Zak	Create a Life to Love	Finalist	
2020	Alyssa Cole	Once Ghosted, Twice Shy	Finalist	
2020	M. Ullrich	Pretending in Paradise	Finalist	
2020	Jae	The Roommate Arrangement	Finalist	
2020	Virginia Hale	The Secret Chord	Finalist	
2020	Donna K. Ford	Tennessee Whiskey	Finalist	
2020	M. Ullrich	Top of Her Game	Finalist	
2021	Alexandria Bellefleur	Written in the Stars	Winner	
2021	Clare Ashton	Finding Jessica Lambert	Finalist	
2021	Anna Burke	Nottingham	Finalist	
2021	Ali Vali	One More Chance	Finalist	
2021	Jae	Wrong Number, Right Woman	Finalist	
2022	Milena McKay	The Headmistress	Winner	
2022	Jae	Chemistry Lessons	Finalist	
2022	E. J. Noyes	Go Around	Finalist	
2022	Haley Cass	In the Long Run	Finalist	
2022	Gerri Hill	Red Tide at Heron Bay	Finalist	
2023	Nan Campbell	The Rules of Forever	Winner	
2023	Susie Dumond	Queerly Beloved	Finalist	
2023	Aurora Rey	Hard Pressed	Finalist	
2023	E. J. Noyes	If I Don't Ask	Finalist	
2023	K. B. Draper	Southbound and Down	Finalist	
2024	Marianne Ratcliffe	A Lady to Treasure	Finalist	
2024	Kris Bryant	Catch	Finalist	
2024	Georgia Beers	Dance with Me	Finalist	
2024	Lisa Peers	Love at 350°	Finalist	
2024	Melissa Brayden	Lucky in Lace	Finalist	
2025	Alison Cochrun	Here We Go Again	Winner	
2025	Jae	Bachelorette Number Twelve	Finalist	
2025	Carrie Byrd	Loser of the Year	Finalist	
2025	Liza Wemakor	Loving Safoa	Finalist	
2025	Lori G. Matthews	Outlaw Hearts	Finalist	
2026	Alexandra Vasti	Ladies in Hating	Winner	
2026	Susie Dumond	Bed and Breakup	Finalist	
2026	Evie Marque	Hot Tea & Bird Calls	Finalist	
2026	Harley Laroux	House of Rayne	Finalist	
2026	Roslyn Sinclair	The Woman from the Waves	Finalist	
