= Jane Fletcher (English writer) =

English writer of lesbian speculative fiction

Jane Fletcher (born August 1956) is an English writer of lesbian speculative fiction. Her The Walls of Westenfort won the Golden Crown Literary Society's 2005 "Sci-Fi / Fantasy / Horror / Paranormal / Speculative" award, and her The Empress and the Acolyte won its 2007 Speculative Fiction award. In 2009, she received The Alice B Readers Award for career achievement.

Her Temple Landfall was shortlisted for the Science Fiction/Fantasy/Horror category of the 18th Lambda Literary Awards in 2006, and her Wolfsbane Winter was shortlisted for the same category of the 23rd Lambda Literary Awards in 2011. Her Lorimal's Chalice was shortlisted for the 2003 Gaylactic Spectrum Award for Best Novel.

== Early life and education ==
Fletcher grew up in south east London, and has a degree in Physics (1980) from the University of Surrey.

== Selected publications ==
=== The Celeano series ===
- The Temple at Landfall (November 2005, Bold Strokes Books: ISBN 978-1933110271), Original title: The World Celaeno Chose (November 1999, The Dimsdale Press ISBN 0952362538)
- The Walls of Westernfort (September 2005, Bold Strokes Books: ISBN 978-1933110240)
- Rangers at Roadsend (August 2005, Bold Strokes Books: ISBN 978-1933110288), Original title: The Wrong Trail Knife (2003, Fortitude Press, Inc. ISBN 978-0974137827)
- Dynasty of Rogues (March 2007, Bold Strokes Books: ISBN 978-1933110714)
- Shadow of the Knife (February 2008, Bold Strokes Books: ISBN 978-1602820081)

=== The Lyremouth Chronicles ===
- The Exile and the Sorcerer (February 2006, Bold Strokes Books: ISBN 978-1933110325)
- The Traitor and the Chalice (June 2006, Bold Strokes Books: ISBN 978-1933110431)
- The Empress and the Acolyte (November 2006, Bold Strokes Books: ISBN 978-1933110608)
- The High Priest and the Idol (July 2009, Bold Strokes Books: ISBN 978-1602820852)

=== Others ===
- Wolfsbane Winter (July 2011, Bold Strokes Books: ISBN 978-1602821583)
- The Shewstone (2016, Bold Strokes Books: ISBN 9781626395541)
- Isle of Broken Years (2018, Bold Strokes Books: ISBN 978-1635551754)
