= Karin Kallmaker =

American author of lesbian fiction

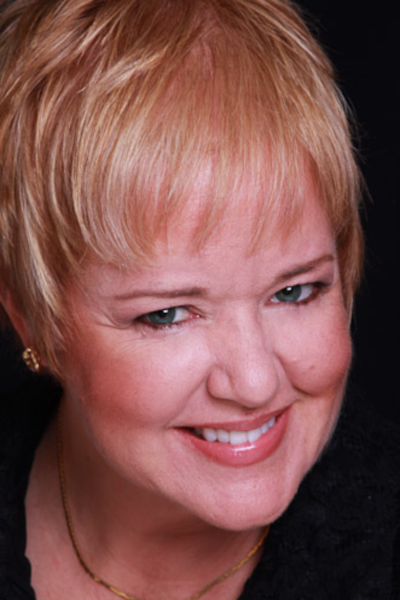
- Karin Kallmaker, 2009
- Born: 1960 (age 65–66); Sacramento, California
- Occupations: Novelist, short story writer
- Writing career
- Pen name: Karin Kallmaker, Laura Adams
- Period: 20th century, 21st century
- Genres: Romance, Fantasy
- Notable awards: Lambda Literary Awards, Golden Crown Literary Society Awards, Ann Bannon Popular Choice
- Movement: Lesbian literature
- Website: kallmaker.com

Karin Kallmaker (born 1960) is an American author of lesbian fiction whose works also include those originally written under the name Laura Adams. Her writings span lesbian romance, lesbian erotica, and lesbian science-fiction/fantasy. Dubbed the Queen of Lesbian Romance, she publishes exclusively in the lesbian market as a matter of personal choice.

== Early life and education ==
Kallmaker was born in 1960 in Sacramento, California. She graduated from California State University, Sacramento with a B.A. in Business Administration in 1988.

== Lesbian romance novels writing as Karin Kallmaker ==
Considered a master at characterization, Kallmaker's work reflects the interior lives of her lesbian heroines, set primarily in romance novel situations. "Credible and spirited" protagonists also face contemporary social challenges, resulting in a body of work that reflects lesbian community history since her debut novel, In Every Port (1989), which included events surrounding the assassination of Harvey Milk in 1978. Her second novel, Touchwood, established her as a writer with "a sure sense of the power of language and of the power of eros." Her typical heroine is "the kind of indestructible and talented woman we all dream we could be -- much like Molly Bolt in Rubyfruit Jungle."

In spite of publishing the majority of her work as lesbian romance genre fiction, "there's something original to every book", featuring "complex stories of believable, vulnerable lesbian characters who grow strong through facing tough issues." Deeply influenced by mentor Katherine V. Forrest as an emerging writer, her fifth novel, Painted Moon, was hailed as "the next Curious Wine," and remains one of her most popular novels, fifteen years after its original publication. Crediting Jane Austen as a foremother of the modern novel, Kallmaker's Just Like That is a lesbian version of Pride and Prejudice.

Another homage-by-genre-twist novel is Christabel, inspired by the Samuel Taylor Coleridge poem of the same name. Written initially under the pen name Laura Adams, Kallmaker dedicated the novel to Jeannette Howard Foster for her examination of the lesbian subtext, moving her to retell the story with the women triumphant. Her ability to push the boundaries of genre fiction while maintaining her popularity is epitomized by Maybe Next Time, "an engrossing, compelling story of redemption, healing and surviving," which won a Lambda Literary Award.

Her novels include the Golden Crown Literary Society and Lambda Literary Foundation award-winning 18th & Castro, In Deep Waters 1/2, Just Like That, The Kiss that Counted, Maybe Next Time, and Sugar. Her writing career began with Naiad Press, one of the shaping publishers of lesbian fiction. In 2001, she placed her work as Laura Adams with a new press, Bella Books. After Naiad Press closed in 2003, she moved the remainder of her lesbian romance titles to Bella. In 2008, she joined Bella Books as the press's first editorial director, and retired from that position in 2015.

== Short stories and essays writing as Karin Kallmaker ==
A "cleverly inventive" short story writer, she has published more than 60+ short stories in collections from her own publishers, as well as anthologies from publishers such as Alyson Books, Regal Crest Enterprises, Circlet Press, Bold Strokes Books, and Haworth Press. She also publishes novellas and short stories from her own imprint Romance and Chocolate Ink. The genre of her stories go from vanilla romance to high-level spice. In a May 2006 interview with Q Syndicate, Kallmaker discussed some of the resistance she faced to the idea that a romance writer could also write erotica. "...Part of my goal for writing erotica was to decriminalize lesbian sex for lesbians, especially those in committed couples and those who don't live in an urban Mecca with an out-and-proud sex-positive attitude." Volumes containing her lesbian erotica short stories have won awards from the Golden Crown Literary Society and the Lambda Literary Foundation.

Published essays have dealt with issues of identity for the author. In 1993, she wrote "When I Grow Up I Want to Be a Lesbian" for Multicultural America: A Resource Book for Teachers of Humanities and American Studies, which explored the disconnect between different stages of coming out, when she first observed the community but did not yet feel a member of it. Ten years later, after the birth of her two children: "For many years I was, by all outward appearances, a suburban married woman." In 2007, in Love, Castro Street, her essay "Where One Size Fits All" concluded the award-winning anthology with "No matter what my clothing of the day might be, from a shy writer offering to sign her first novel to a seeming soccer mom with two kids in tow, Castro Street has never refused me entry. The potholes, the crowds, the scary traffic are still there, but somehow the street is larger than ever." Ten years later, in 2017, she contributed "My Nose Pressed Against the Glass of History" to Our Happy Hours: LGBT Voices from the Gay Bars edited by S. Renee Bess and Lee Lynch (author). This essay focused on her first, and also last, visit to a lesbian bar as the guest of editor Katherine V. Forrest.

== Science fiction and fantasy novels as Laura Adams ==
As Laura Adams, Kallmaker has written lesbian science fiction and fantasy titles that include a "chilling brush with reality." Though the novels include strong lesbian romance storylines, their themes revolve around the power of lesbian community and spirituality.

== Works ==
Kallmaker worked for 18 years in non-profit financial management. Workplaces, such as an association of home and health care service providers to the elderly, a private lender investing in projects to benefit low income people, and a half-year at an oil refinery, have provided background for many of her novels.

=== Romance ===
- In Every Port (1990)
- Touchwood (1991), translated into French as Au grand jour
- Paperback Romance (1992)
- Car Pool (1993), translated into French as Emporte-moi
- Painted Moon (1994)
- Wild Things (1996), translated into French as Libera me
- Embrace in Motion (1997)
- Night Vision (1997) (writing as Laura Adams)
- Christabel (1998) (writing as Laura Adams), revised edition under the name of Karin Kallmaker (2008)
- Making Up for Lost Time (1998)
- Watermark (1999)
- The Dawning (1999) (writing as Laura Adams)
- Unforgettable (2000)
- Frosting on the Cake (2001) (short stories)
- Tunnel of Light 1: Sleight of Hand (2001) (writing as Laura Adams)
- Substitute for Love (2001)
- Tunnel of Light 2: Seeds of Fire (2002) (writing as Laura Adams)
- Maybe Next Time (2003)
- One Degree of Separation (2004)
- Sugar (2004)
- Just Like That (2005)
- Finders Keepers (2006), translated into French as La Belle Éprise
- The Kiss That Counted (2008), translated into German as Es begann mit einem Kuss
- Warming Trend (2009)
- Stepping Stone (2009)
- Above Temptation (2010)
- Roller Coaster (2011)
- Love by the Numbers (2013)
- Captain of Industry (2016)
- Castle Wrath (2017)
- My Lady Lipstick (2018)
- Because I Said So (2019)
- Simply the Best (2021)
- Cowboys and Kisses (2022)
- Velvet in Venice (2022)
- Knight of Nights (2023)
- Wind in Her Hair (2023)
- Checked Out (2023)
- Frosting on the Cake 3: Still Crazy After All These Years (2025)
- Covered Hearts (2026)

=== Erotic Romance ===
- All the Wrong Places (2004), translated into French as Petits jeux entre amies
- Once Upon a Dyke (2004) (with Johnson, Szymanski, Watts), cover: "New Exploits of Fairy Tale Lesbians"
- Bell, Book and Dyke (2005) (with Johnson, Szymanski, Watts), cover: "New Exploits of Magical Lesbians"
- 18th & Castro (2006) (short stories)
- Stake through the Heart (2006) (with Johnson, Szymanski, Watts), cover: "New Exploits of Twilight Lesbians"
- Tall in the Saddle (2007) (with Johnson, Szymanski, Watts), cover: "New Exploits of Wild West Lesbians"
- In Deep Waters 1: Cruising the Seas (2007) (with Radclyffe)
- In Deep Waters 2: Cruising the Strip (2008) (with Radclyffe)

== Works in translation, audiobook, and other formats ==
Numerous novels have been translated for distribution in France (KTM Editions), Germany (Verlag Krug & Schadenberg), Spain (Egales) and the Czech Republic (LePress). Numerous titles have been professionally recorded for audiobook release by RBMedia. Some titles have also been acquired for hardcover editions by InsightOut Book Club, a division of the Quality Paperback Book Club. A complete listing of works in translation and audiobook format is available on the author's website.

== Awards ==
- 2026 - Frosting on the Cake 3: Still Crazy After All These Years – Golden Crown Literary Award Winner, Sapphic Short Story Collection
- 2023 - Simply the Best – Golden Crown Literary Award Finalist, Sapphic Romance, Ann Bannon Popular Choice
- 2020 - Because I Said So – Golden Crown Literary Award Winner, Lesbian Contemporary Romance
- 2019 - My Lady Lipstick – Golden Crown Literary Award Winner, Lesbian Romantic Blend
- 2016 - Captain of Industry – Golden Crown Literary Award Finalist, Ann Bannon Popular Choice
- 2013 - Love by the Numbers – Lambda Literary Finalist, Lesbian Romance
- 2012 - Roller Coaster – Golden Crown Literary Award Finalist, Lesbian Romance
- 2011 - Above Temptation – Golden Crown Literary Award Winner, Lesbian Romantic Suspense
- 2011 - Frosting on the Cake 2 – Golden Crown Literary Award Winner, Lesbian Anthology/Short Story
- 2010 - Stepping Stone – Lambda Literary Award Finalist, Lesbian Romance
- 2009 - The Kiss that Counted – Lambda Literary Award Winner, Lesbian Romance
- 2009 - The Kiss that Counted – Golden Crown Literary Award Winner, Ann Bannon Popular Choice
- 2009 - In Deep Waters 2: Cruising the Strip - Lambda Literary Award Winner, Lesbian Erotica co-authored with Radclyffe
- 2008 - In Deep Waters 1: Cruising the Seas - Golden Crown Literary Award Winner, Lesbian Erotica co-authored with Radclyffe
- 2008 - Finders Keepers - Golden Crown Literary Award Finalist, Lesbian Romance
- 2008 - Finders Keepers - Golden Crown Literary Award Finalist, Ann Bannon Popular Choice
- 2007 - 18th & Castro – Golden Crown Literary Award Winner, Lesbian Erotica
- 2007 - 18th & Castro – Lambda Literary Award Finalist, LGBTQ Erotica
- 2007 - Finders Keepers – Lambda Literary Award Finalist, Lesbian Romance
- 2006 - Just Like That – Golden Crown Literary Award Winner, Lesbian Romance
- 2006 - New Exploits 2: Bell, Book and Dyke - Golden Crown Literary Award Finalist, Lesbian Fantasy co-authored with Julia Watts, Therese Szymanski and Barbara Johnson
- 2006 - All the Wrong Places –Golden Crown Literary Award Finalist, Lesbian Romance
- 2006 - All the Wrong Places – Lambda Literary Award Finalist, Lesbian Erotica
- 2006 - All the Wrong Places – Lambda Literary Award Finalist, Lesbian Romance
- 2005 - Sugar - Golden Crown Literary Award Winner, Lesbian Romance
- 2005 - New Exploits 1: Once Upon a Dyke - Lambda Literary Award Finalist, Fantasy novella collection co-authored with Julia Watts, Therese Szymanski and Barbara Johnson
- 2004 - Maybe Next Time – Lambda Literary Award Winner, Romance
- 2003 - Tunnel of Light 2: Seeds of Fire - Lambda Literary Award Finalist, Fantasy
- 2002 - Substitute for Love - Lambda Literary Award Finalist, Romance

== Other recognitions ==
- 2004 Alice B Medal - The Alice B Readers Award for body of work
- 2008 Selected as guest lecturer, Distinguished Author Series, Stonewall Library and Archives
- 2008 LJ Maas Memorial Award for mentorship of new and emerging writers
- 2011 Golden Crown Literary Society Trailblazer Award

== Personal ==
Kallmaker and her partner of nearly 50 years reside in the San Francisco Bay Area. They were married on August 25, 2008, and are the mothers of two children, Kelson and Lee. In 2022, the author was diagnosed with breast cancer by routine mammogram and is now cancer free.
