= Alison Cochrun =

- Born: 1986 or 1987 (age 39–40)
- Occupation: Author
- Writing career
- Genre: LGBTQ romance
- Website: www.alisoncochrun.com

Alison Cochrun is an American author of LGBTQ romance novels.

== Career ==
The Charm Offensive was a finalist in the Romance category of the 2021 Bisexual Book Awards, and as of January 2026 has a planned feature film adaptation with actor Nik Dodani.

Kiss Her Once for Me won the LGBTQ+ Romance & Erotica category in the 35th Lambda Literary Awards.

Here We Go Again won the Lesbian Romance category in the 37th Lambda Literary Awards, and was named a Stonewall Honor book in the Literature category of the 2025 Stonewall Book Award.

== Works ==
- The Charm Offensive (2021)
- Kiss Her Once for Me (2022)
- Here We Go Again (2024)
- Every Step She Takes (2025)

== Accolades ==
Year	Award	Category	Title	Notes	Result
2021	Bisexual Book Awards	Romance	The Charm Offensive		Finalist
2023	35th Lambda Literary Awards	LGBTQ+ Romance & Erotica	Kiss Her Once for Me		Won
2025	37th Lambda Literary Awards	Lesbian Romance	Here We Go Again		Won
2025	Stonewall Book Award	Literature	Here We Go Again		Honor

== Personal life ==
Cochrun is demisexual and a lesbian. She has two children, and lives near Portland, Oregon with her wife. Before she became a full-time author, she worked as a high school English teacher.

Every Step She Takes was inspired by her own walk through one route of the Camino de Santiago.
