= Alice B Readers Award =

Literary award for lesbian texts

Alice B Medal
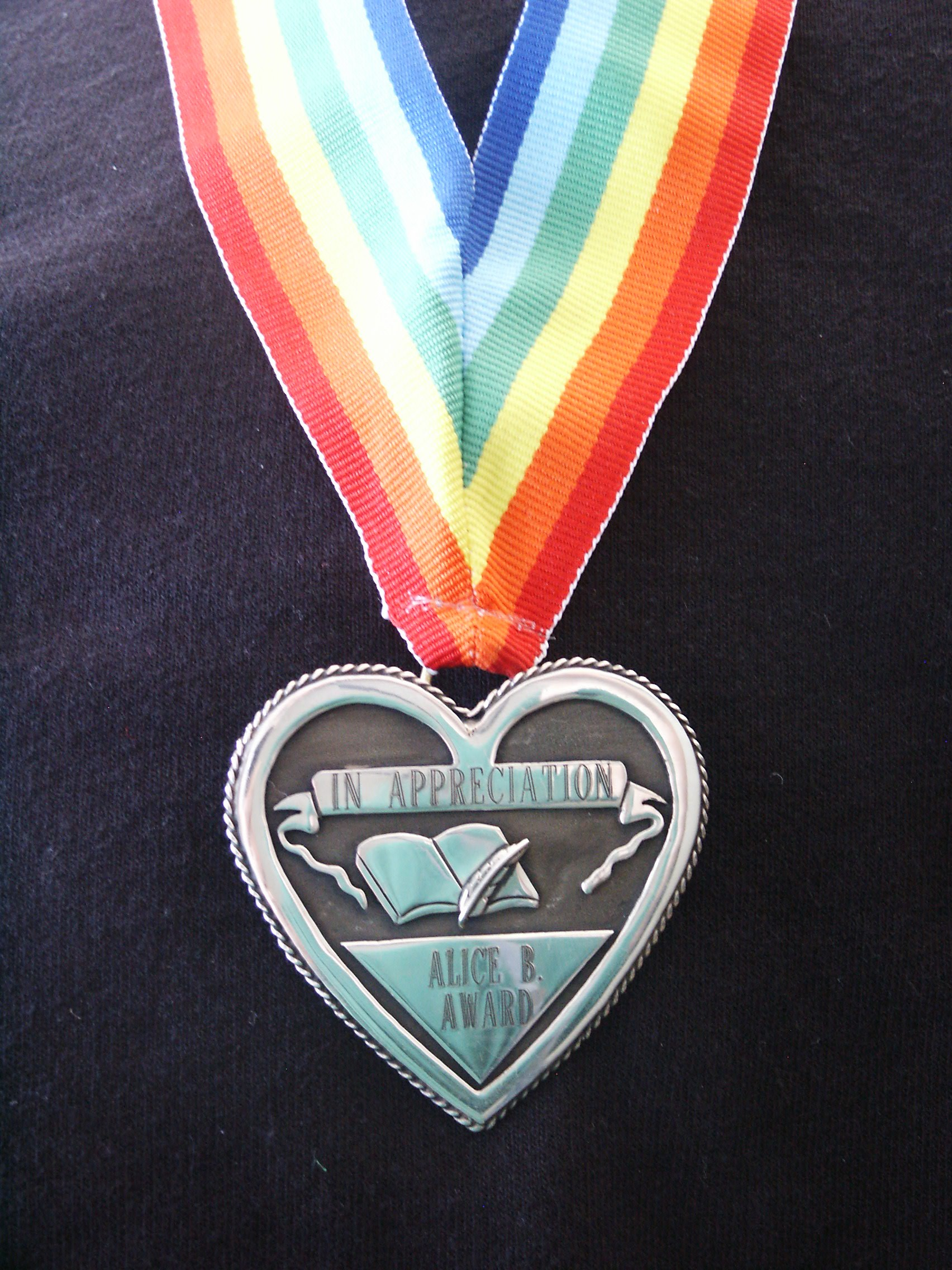
- Alice B Medal Awarded Annually
- Website: www.alicebawards.org

The Alice B Readers Award is given annually to living writers of lesbian fiction whose careers are distinguished by consistently well-written stories about lesbians. Named for Alice B. Toklas, the award is given once, only, in appreciation of career achievement. In addition to the medal, each recipient is given a lapel pin and a significant honorarium.

The Award was founded by Roberta "Sandy" Sandburg, who died of cancer at the age of 72 on June 16, 2009. Sandburg envisioned the Alice B Awards a decade or so ago, and in 2004 decided to make the awards a reality by committing funds from "an anonymous donor". A lifelong reader who was passionate about lesbian fiction, Sandburg wanted to thank and reward the authors who had given her so much joy, and she did so by establishing the Alice B fund and gathering a group of women who became the Alice B Readers Appreciation Committee.

In addition to Alice B Medals, until 2016 the Committee awarded Alice B Lavender Certificates to up-and-coming authors who do not yet have a body of work but who have published a remarkable work or two deserving of notice. Winners of the certificate received an honorarium of $50. After 2016, the Lavender Certificate was suspended. Due to the overwhelming number of debut writers, the committee was no longer able to read so many debut books.

By 2021, the Committee acknowledged that so many lesbian books were being published each year that they could no longer keep up and came to believe they were missing writers of great merit. In 2021, the committee began inviting readers, publishers, and authors to submit any book that they believe is a "Best Work of Fiction" by an author and representative of the author being named as deserving of a medal for lifetime achievement.

== Significance of the award ==
Historically, lesbians have rarely had their voices heard in the fiction or nonfiction of modern society, (except perhaps as footnotes in medical journals regarding pathology). As Bertha Harris, author of many novels including Lover, once wrote: "Between the time of Sappho and the birth of Natalie Clifford Barney lies a 'lesbian silence' of twenty-four centuries." It was not until the 1970s and the establishment of Naiad Press (after the Stonewall riots in 1969), that books by, for, and about lesbians began to be regularly published. Still, it was a long hard road with little recognition and to this day, considerable difficulties and discrimination face authors of lesbian works.

The Alice B Award is one small contribution toward overcoming discrimination. As Martha Nell Smith wrote:

The trajectory of lesbian literature for the first two-thirds of the twentieth century can be described as a movement from encrypted strategies for expressions of the love that dare not speak its name to overtly political celebrations of woman-for-woman passion that, by the late 1960s, refused to be denied, denigrated, or expunged.

The Alice B Award exists to honor and recognize forerunners of modern lesbian fiction including Ann Bannon, Jane Rule, Marijane Meaker, Sandra Scoppettone, Katherine V. Forrest, and Lee Lynch, as well as to the new voices who are providing information, entertainment, and enlightenment to lesbians around the world.

== The Alice B Awards Committee ==
The Alice B Awards Committee is an anonymous group of avid lesbian readers located around the US. The award is made possible by an anonymous donor. The donor and committee share a common goal: to reward and thank writers of lesbian fiction for their contribution to lesbian community, culture, and identity.

At least two Medals are given out annually. Selections are made from lists compiled by the committee members’ to include their all-time favorite living authors currently publishing and also those with a substantial body of excellent work, even if they are not now publishing.

== Winners of the Alice B Award ==
=== 2026 ===
- Nancy Manahan
- Rita Potter
- Bev Prescott
- Kim Pritekel

=== 2025 ===
- Sandra Butler
- Sandra de Helen
- Emma Donoghue
- Catherine Lundoff

=== 2024 ===
- Nat Burns
- Carolyn Gage
- Tracey Richardson
- Brey Willows

=== 2023 ===
- Georgia Beers
- Abigail Padgett
- Lee Winter

=== 2022 ===
- Jessie Chandler
- Camarin Grae
- Cheryl A. Head
- Anne Laughlin

=== 2021 ===
- Jae
- Malinda Lo
- Caren J. Werlinger

=== 2020 ===
- Lynn Ames
- Penny Mickelbury
- Jeanette Winterson

=== 2019 ===
- Dorothy Allison
- S. Renée Bess
- Fletcher DeLancey
- Mary Wings

=== 2018 ===
- Penny Hayes
- Barbara Johnson
- Rachel Spangler

=== 2017 ===
- Melissa Brayden
- Jaye Maiman
- Ann McMan

=== 2016 ===
- Justine Saracen
- Carsen Taite
- Pat Welch

=== 2015 ===
- Carol Anshaw
- Randye Lordon
- D Jordan Redhawk

=== 2014 ===
- Marianne K. Martin
- Susan X. Meagher
- Ann Roberts

=== 2013 ===
- Robin Alexander
- Sandra Scoppettone
- Linda K. Silva

=== 2012 ===
- Saxon Bennett
- KG MacGregor
- Gill McKnight

=== 2011 ===
- Erin Dutton
- Fran Heckrotte
- Ali Vali

=== 2010 ===
- Catherine Friend
- JM Redmann (also known as Jean M. Redmann)
- Kate Sweeney

=== 2009 ===
- Gun Brooke
- Jane Fletcher
- Nicola Griffith
- Lesléa Newman

=== 2008 ===
- Ann Bannon
- Kim Baldwin
- Cate Culpepper
- Lauren Wright Douglas
- Jennifer L. Jordan
- Val McDermid
- Joanna Russ
- Therese Szymanski

=== 2007 ===
- Alison Bechdel
- Gerri Hill
- Lori L. Lake
- Lee Lynch
- Marijane Meaker
- Jane Rule

=== 2006 ===
- Jennifer Fulton
- Claire McNab
- Ann Allen Shockley
- Sheila Ortiz Taylor

=== 2005 ===
- Sarah Dreher
- Katherine V. Forrest
- Ellen Hart

=== 2004 ===
- Peggy J. Herring
- Karin Kallmaker
- Radclyffe

== Winners of the Lavender Certificate ==
=== 2005 ===
- Jaime Clevenger for The Unknown Mile
- Gabrielle Goldsby for The Caretaker's Daughter
- C. Paradee for Deep Cover

=== 2006 ===
- Cynthia Tyler for Descanso

=== 2007 ===
- Brenda Adcock for Pipeline

=== 2008 ===
- L-J Baker for Broken Wings
- Catherine Friend for The Spanish Pearl
- Nairne Holtz for The Skin Beneath

=== 2009 ===
- Del Robertson for Taming the Wolff
- Gill McKnight for Falling Star and Green-eyed Monster

=== 2010 ===
- DL Line for On Dangerous Ground
- Colette Moody for The Sublime and Spirited Voyage of Original Sin
- Carsen Taite for truelesbianlove.com

=== 2011 ===
- Amy Briant for Shadow Point
- Nat Burns for Two Weeks in August
- Gina Noelle Daggett for Jukebox
- D. Jackson Leigh for Bareback and Long Shot
- Kristin Marra for Wind and Bones
- Amy Dawson Robertson for Miles to Go

=== 2012 ===
- Regina Hanel for Love Another Day
- Cari Hunter for Snowbound
- Ann McMan for Jericho
- AJ Quinn for Hostage Moon
- Pol Robinson for Open Water

=== 2013 ===
- Andrea Bramhall for Ladyfish
- Maggie Morton for Dreaming of Her
- Jenna Rae for The Writing on the Wall
- Robin Silverman for Lemon Reef
- Rebecca Swartz for Everything Pales in Comparison

=== 2014 ===
- Miriam Ruth Black for Turtle Season
- Lea Daley for Waiting for Harper Lee
- M E Logan for Lexington Connection
- Diane Wood for Web of Obsessions

=== 2015 ===
- Marie Castle for Hell's Belle
- Jaime Maddox for Agnes

=== 2016 ===
- Jean Copeland for The Revelation of Beatrice Darby
- Jenny Frame for A Royal Romance
- Sophia French for The Diplomat
- Brandy T. Wilson for The Palace Blues

== Notes ==
1. The Lesbian History Portal. Retrieved on 2008-05-31.
2. Bertha Harris on glbtq.com Retrieved on 2008-05-31.
3. American Literature: Lesbian, 1900-1969. Martha Nell Smith. Retrieved on 2008-05-31.
4. The Alice B Medal Current Winners Biographical page. Retrieved on 2014-02-14.

5. The Alice B Medal Past Winners Page. Retrieved on 2014-02-14.
