= Cate Culpepper =

American writer (1957–2014)

- Born: June 29, 1957; Las Cruces, New Mexico, U.S.
- Died: October 25, 2014 (aged 57); Seattle, Washington, U.S.
- Occupation: Writer
- Notable work: Tristaine series, River Walker

Catherine "Cate" Culpepper (June 29, 1957 – October 25, 2014) was an American writer and social worker, based in Seattle. She wrote eight paranormal fantasy novels with lesbian themes. She won a Lambda Literary Award for Lesbian Romance in 2011 for River Walker (2010).

== Biography ==
Culpepper was from Las Cruces, New Mexico, the daughter of Gideon Alston Culpepper and Joyce L. Culpepper. Her father taught math and worked at White Sands Missile Range. Her mother was a nurse and a rolfing practitioner. Culpepper graduated from Las Cruces High School and New Mexico State University.

After college, Culpepper taught school in Las Cruces. She moved to Seattle in 1988, and worked as program manager of a transitional shelter for LGBT youth. She wrote novels, and maintained both a blog and a fan forum, The Storyfire. Her four-book Tristaine series involves a clan of Amazons in the modern world. Her novel River Walker (2010), based on the folktales of La Llorona, won the Lambda Literary Award for Lesbian Romance. She also received three Golden Crown Literary Society Awards.

Culpepper died in 2014, at the age of 57, in Seattle.

== Publications ==
=== Tristaine series ===
- The Clinic (2001)
- Battle for Tristaine (2005)
- Tristaine Rises (2006)
- Queens of Tristaine (2007)

=== Other novels ===
- Fireside (2009)
- River Walker (2010)
- A Question of Ghosts (2012)
- Windigo Thrall (2014)

=== Short stories ===
- "Bus Stop Revisited" (2002)
- "Silent Vows" (2008)
- "Luminaria Light" (2010)
