= KG MacGregor =

American fiction writer (born 1955)

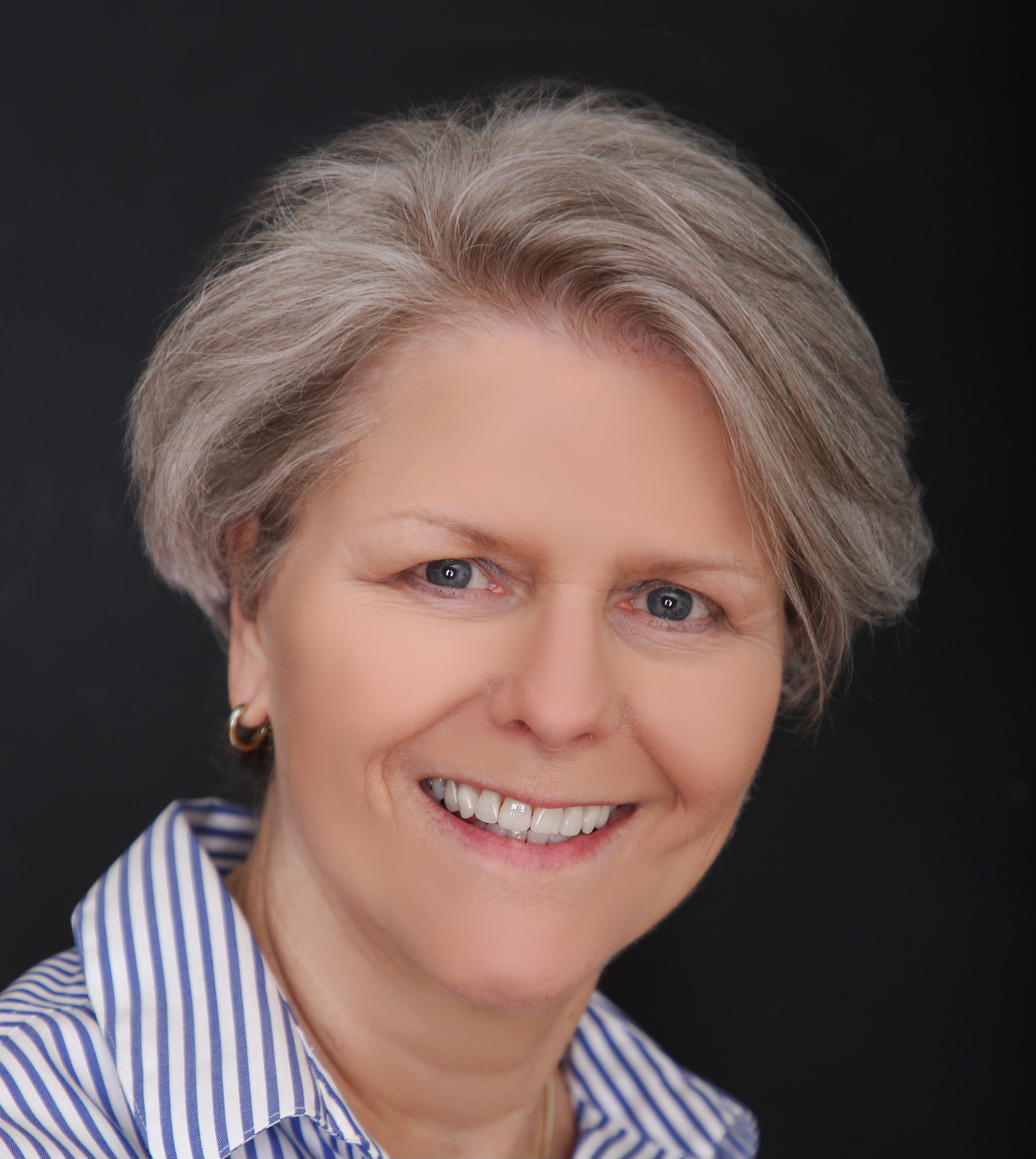
- Author KG MacGregor (Amelia Campbell Photography, used with permission)
- Born: October 22, 1955 (age 70); Wilmington, North Carolina, U.S.
- Education: Appalachian State University (BS); University of South Florida (MA); University of North Carolina at Chapel Hill (PhD)
- Writing career
- Genre: Fiction
- Notable awards: Lambda Literary Award, Golden Crown Literary Society Awards, and The Alice B Readers Award for Lifetime Achievement

KG MacGregor (aka Sue A. Greer, born October 22, 1955) is an American writer of lesbian fiction. She has authored over two dozen lesbian romance novels, collecting a Lambda Literary Award for Lesbian Romance and nine Goldie Awards from the Golden Crown Literary Society, including the Ann Bannon Popular Choice Award. MacGregor served six years on the Board of Trustees of the Lambda Literary Foundation, including two years as board president.

== Early life and education ==
KG MacGregor was born into a military family and attended public schools in North Carolina, Kentucky, and Pennsylvania, graduating high school in 1973. She enrolled in Appalachian State University and earned a BS in education in 1976.

In 1984, MacGregor was fired from a teaching job after being outed as a lesbian. She changed careers, returning to college for an MA in Mass Communication from the University of South Florida in 1990 and a PhD in Media Research from the University of North Carolina at Chapel Hill in 1994. Her PhD dissertation is entitled Media Use and Knowledge Acquisition: The Cycle of Learning from the News.

With a focus on political and issues polling and strategic audience analysis, MacGregor built a market research clientele that included newspapers, magazines, government institutions, and non-profits. From 2000 to 2004, she was director of research for TRAC Media Services, which provided programming and fundraising support for public television stations.

== Writing career ==
MacGregor's writing career began in 2002 when she posted lesbian Fan fiction for the Xena: Warrior Princess fan community. In 2006, Bella Books published her first romance novel, Just This Once. MacGregor's romance saga, The Shaken Series, was called “ground-breaking” by Left Bank Books.

Discussing the challenges of romance writing with Lambda Literary editor William Johnson, MacGregor described “the boundaries of the genre, i.e., two characters will overcome conflicts to be together, and their story will end on a happy or hopeful note” but said she can't accept “that it has to be utterly predictable. My challenge with each story is therefore to deliver a credible surprise.”

In an interview with Relationshipsarecomplicated.com, MacGregor noted that her favorite stories feature “characters who face challenges together and discover how love makes them stronger,” adding that she is “proud of any book that inspires readers to the virtues of kindness, honesty and courage.”

== Works ==
(All Works Published by Bella Books unless noted)

=== Standalone novels ===
- Bringing Me Dreams (2022) ISBN 978-1-64247-406-0
- The Lucky Ones (2019) ISBN 978-1-64247-041-3
- The House on Sandstone (2019) ISBN 978-1-59493-076-8
- A Proper Cuppa Tea (2018) ISBN 978-1-59493-607-4
- Moment of Weakness (2017) ISBN 978-1-59493-557-2
- Trial by Fury (2016) ISBN 978-1-59493-492-6
- Touch of a Woman (2015) ISBN 978-1-59493-465-0
- T-Minus Two (2015) ISBN 978-1-59493-452-0
- Life After Love (2014)
- Anyone But You (2014) ISBN 978-1-59493-407-0
- West of Nowhere (2013) ISBN 978-1-59493-345-5
- Etched in Shadows (2013) ISBN 978-1-59493-373-8
- Rhapsody (2012) ISBN 978-1-59493-293-9
- Playing with Fuego (2012) ISBN 978-1-59493-313-4
- Photographs of Claudia (2010) ISBN 978-1-59493-168-0
- Worth Every Step (2009) ISBN 978-1-59493-142-0
- Sea Legs (2009) ISBN 978-1-59493-158-1
- Secrets So Deep (2008) ISBN 978-1-59493-125-3
- Sumter Point (2007) ISBN 978-1-59493-089-8
- Out of Love (2007) ISBN 978-1-59493-105-5
- Just This Once (2006) ISBN 978-1-59493-087-4
- Mulligan (2005) ISBN 978-1-59493-070-6
- Malicious Pursuit (2004) ISBN 978-1-59493-118-5

=== Series ===
- Shaken Series #1: Without Warning (2008) ISBN 978-1-59493-120-8
- Shaken Series #2: Aftershock (2008) ISBN 978-1-59493-135-2
- Shaken Series #3: Small Packages (2009) ISBN 978-1-59493-149-9
- Shaken Series #4: Mother Load (2010) ISBN 978-1-59493-204-5
- Shaken Series #5: Words Unsaid (2021) ISBN 978-1-64247-281-3

=== Short stories ===
- “A Thankless Job” (2021)
- “Ship of Fools” (2021)
- “Every Single Vote” (2019)
- “Mulligan: Best Ball” (2012)
- “Luck of the Irish” (2012)

=== Anthology contributions ===
- In This Together (2021) ISBN 978-1-64247-333-9
- Happily Ever After (2016) ISBN 978-1-59493-542-8
- Undercover Tales (2007), published by Brisk Press

== Awards ==
- 2019: A Proper Cuppa Tea – Golden Crown Literary Award Winner, Ann Bannon Popular Choice
- 2017: Trial by Fury – Golden Crown Literary Award Winner, General Fiction
- 2016: T-Minus Two – Golden Crown Literary Award Winner, Romantic Suspense/Intrigue/Adventure
- 2013: Playing With Fuego – Golden Crown Literary Award Winner, Romantic Suspense/Intrigue/Adventure
- 2011: Photographs of Claudia – Golden Crown Literary Award Winner, Contemporary Traditional Romance
- 2010: Worth Every Step – Golden Crown Literary Award Winner, Contemporary Traditional Romance
- 2009: Secrets So Deep – Golden Crown Literary Award Winner, Romantic Suspense/Intrigue/Adventure
- 2009: Without Warning – Golden Crown Literary Award Winner, Contemporary Traditional Romance
- 2008: Out of Love – Golden Crown Literary Award Winner, Contemporary Traditional Romance
- 2007: Out of Love – Lambda Literary Award Winner, Lesbian Romance

== Other recognition ==
- 2011: Keynote speech entitled “Walking the Trail” at Golden Crown Literary Society's annual conference. In the Keynote speech, MacGregor “asked readers to follow even when I led them out of their comfort zone” and “other writers to lead them there too.” The goal is to “take the reader on a difficult and uncertain journey but make that reading experience worthwhile.”
- 2011: Lifetime Achievement Award – Royal Academy of Bards
- 2012: Alice B Medal – The Alice B Readers Award for her body of work.

== Select interviews ==
- 2022: Cocktail Hour Productions: Interview with KG MacGregor
- 2020: Bella Books Authors Corner, KG MacGregor T-Minus Two
- 2017: Les Do Books: KG MacGregor's Recent Lesfic Reads
- 2014: The Liz McMullen Show: Episode 44: KG MacGregor
- 2013: KG MacGregor at the yearly conference in Dallas
- 2013: 18 and Counting with Carsen Taite

== Select reviews ==
- 2021: Words Unsaid – Golden Crown Literary Award Finalist, General Fiction
- 2019: A Proper Cuppa Tea – Golden Crown Literary Award Winner, Ann Bannon Popular Choice, and Finalist, Contemporary Romance: Mid-Length Novels
- 2017: Trial by Fury – Golden Crown Literary Award Winner, General Fiction and Finalist, Ann Bannon Popular Choice
- 2017: Moment of Weakness – Golden Crown Literary Award Finalist, Romantic Suspense/Intrigue/Adventure
- 2016: T-Minus Two – Golden Crown Literary Award Winner, Romantic Suspense/Intrigue/Adventure and Finalist, Ann Bannon Popular Choice
- 2015: Touch of a Woman – Golden Crown Literary Award Finalist, Traditional Contemporary Romance
- 2014: Anyone But You – Golden Crown Literary Award Finalist, Romantic Suspense/Intrigue/Adventure and Finalist, Ann Bannon Popular Choice
- 2013: Etched in Shadows – Golden Crown Literary Award Finalist, Traditional Contemporary Romance and Finalist, Ann Bannon Popular Choice
- 2012: Rhapsody – Golden Crown Literary Award Finalist, Ann Bannon Popular Choice
- 2011: Photographs of Claudia – Golden Crown Literary Award Winner, Contemporary Traditional Romance
- 2010: Worth Every Step – Golden Crown Literary Award Winner, Contemporary Traditional Romance, Finalist, Ann Bannon Popular Choice, and Lambda Literary Award Finalist, Lesbian Romance
- 2009: Secrets So Deep – Golden Crown Literary Award Winner, Romantic Suspense/Intrigue/Adventure
- 2009: Without Warning – Golden Crown Literary Award Winner, Contemporary Traditional Romance and Finalist, Ann Bannon Popular Choice
- 2008: Out of Love – Golden Crown Literary Award Winner, Contemporary Traditional Romance, Finalist, Ann Bannon Popular Choice, and Winner, 2007 Lambda Literary Award Winner, Lesbian Romance
- 2006: Just This Once – Golden Crown Literary Award Finalist, Traditional Contemporary Romance and Finalist, Ann Bannon Popular Choice

== Personal ==
MacGregor and her partner of more than 30 years reside in Nashville, Tennessee.
