= Marianne K. Martin =

American novelist and sports coach

- Born: 1945 or 1946 (age 80–81)
- Education: Eastern Michigan University
- Occupations: Novelist; publisher; sports coach
- Coaching career

Coaching career (HC unless noted)

Softball
- 1970s–?: Whitmore Lake HS

Women's field hockey
- 1977–?: Eastern Michigan Eagles

Girls' basketball
- ?–?: Whitmore Lake HS

Marianne K. Martin (born 1945/1946) is an American novelist, publisher, and former high school and college sports coach. She originally worked as a varsity coach at Whitmore Lake High School, including three winning Tri-County Conference softball teams, as well as coach of the Eastern Michigan Eagles women's field hockey team. She later wrote several novels, receiving several Lambda Literary Award nominations for them, co-founded publishing house Bywater Books, and co-directed the documentary In Her Words: 20th Century Lesbian Fiction.

== Biography ==
Martin spent a year studying at Jackson Community College and then graduated from Eastern Michigan University.

In the 1970s, Martin became the girls' basketball coach at Whitmore Lake High School, serving for thirteen years and leading them to the quarterfinals in 1984. She coached three winning Tri-County Conference softball teams for the school. She was The Ann Arbor News' 1984 Special Mention Coach of the Year award. She was also an art teacher and a physical education teacher at Whitmore Lake, as well as a coach for other varsity basketball teams elsewhere in Michigan.

In 1977, Martin became coach of the Eastern Michigan Eagles women's field hockey team. She founded the Michigan Women's Major Fast-Pitch Association, where she was the association's president as well as coach for the Ann Arbor Bleus team.

Martin filed an equal pay lawsuit in 1976, causing the Michigan Civil Rights Commission to rule in her favor in 1980. She applied to be the boys' basketball coach in 1985, but was passed over for a male candidate, which she criticized as gender discrimination. She left her teaching job in order to focus on social activism after one of her students died from suicide.

Martin's novel Mirrors was a finalist for the 2002 Lambda Literary Award for Romance. She was nominated for the Lambda Literary Award for Lesbian Romance three times: for For Now, for Always in 2008, Tangled Roots in 2015, and The Liberators of Willow Run in 2017. Other novels she published are Dance in the Key of Love, Dawn of the Dance, The Indelible Heart, Kickin' Rocks, Legacy of Love, Love in the Balance, Never Ending, Under the Witness Tree, and Whisper to the Wind. According to Martin, her work "explore[s] the 'in spite of,' the 'against the odds' battle for love and happiness and justice within our community".

Martin co-founded publishing house Bywater Books. She won the 2012 Golden Crown Literary Society Trailblazer Award and a 2014 Alice B Readers Award, and she was one of GO Magazine's 2013 100 Women We Love. She and Lisa Marie Evans co-directed the documentary In Her Words: 20th Century Lesbian Fiction.

Martin is lesbian.

== Bibliography ==
- Dance in the Key of Love
- Dawn of the Dance
- For Now, For Always
- The Indelible Heart
- Kickin' Rocks
- Legacy of Love
- The Liberators of Willow Run
- Love in the Balance
- Mirrors
- Never Ending
- Tangled Roots
- Under the Witness Tree
- Whisper to the Wind
