= Sandra Moran =

American writer and educator (1968–2015)

- Born: December 20, 1968; Topeka, Kansas, US
- Died: November 7, 2015 (aged 46)
- Education: Mission Valley High School (1987); University of Kansas (BS, MA, MS)
- Alma mater: University of Kansas

Sandra Moran (December 20, 1968 – November 7, 2015) was an American writer, educator, and anthropologist. She taught at Johnson County Community College and was the author of Letters Never Sent (2013), The Addendum (2014), Nudge (2014), All We Lack (2015), and State of Grace (2016).

== Early life and education ==
Sandra Moran was born on December 20, 1968, in Topeka, Kansas, and grew up in Dover. She had three siblings.

After graduating from Mission Valley High School in 1987, Moran attended the University of Kansas, earning a Bachelor of Science in journalism, Master of Arts in public administration, and a Master of Science in anthropology.

== Career ==
Moran started her career as a journalist, reporting for The Topeka Capital-Journal and the Lawrence Journal-World. Later, she became the deputy press secretary for Kansas Governor Bill Graves. In 2014, Moran joined Johnson County Community College as an assistant adjunct professor teaching anthropology.

Moran published her debut novel, Letters Never Sent, with Bedazzled Ink Publishing in June 2013. Set in 1931 and 1990, the novel centers Katherine Henderson, a farm girl who, in 1931, moves from Kansas to Chicago, where she meets Sears and Roebuck co-workers, Claire and Annie. As Katherine and Annie develop a friendship, their feelings become more romantic, and Katherine must consider what this attraction means for her and her future. In the future, Katherine's daughter, Joan, manages through Katherine's belongings following her death, discovering unsent letters to a mysterious "A". By connecting with her neighbor, Mrs. Yoccum, Joan learns about her mother. Lambda Literary Review's Anna Furtado described the novel as a "well written tale" with a story that "unfolds like a flower", having a "profound" impact on each character. In 2014, Letters Never Sent won the Golden Crown Literary Society's (GCLS) Ann Bannon Popular Choice Award and General Fiction Award, the Rainbow Award for Historical Fiction, and the Rainbow Award for Lesbian Debut Novel. It was also a finalist for the 2014 Edmund White Award, as well as the Rainbow Award for Best Lesbian Novel.

In 2014, Moran published The Addendum and Nudge with Bedazzled Ink Publishing.

All We Lack was published by Bedazzled Ink in March 2015. The novel is written from the perspectives of multiple characters who are connected by a single bus crash. Lambda Literary Review's July Westhale applauded the novel's "rich characters and movable landscapes", as well as how the narrates "illustrates [the characters'] inner consciousnesses". In 2016, All We Lack won the GCLS's Ann Bannon Popular Choice Award.

Moran's final novel, State of Grace (2016), was published posthumously by Bywater Books in June 2016. The novel centers Birdie Holloway through many stages of her life, beginning at age 11 when her friend is murdered, continuing through time as Birdie experiences grief and survivor's guilt, then ultimately searches for her friend's assailant. Lambda Literary Review's July Westhale described the novel as "just as unwieldy, unsparing, and jarring as the experience of trauma itself", adding that "even to a reader that has never experienced trauma of this sort before, [Birdie's] visceral fear of the world around her is understandable on multiple levels".

== Personal life ==
Moran was diagnosed with stage IV cancer in fall 2015 and died on November 7, 2015. At the time of her death, she lived in Kansas with her partner, Cheryl Pletcher.

== Publication ==
- Letters Never Sent. Bedazzled Ink Publishing. 2013. ISBN 978-1-939-56210-4.
- The Addendum. Bedazzled Ink Publishing. 2014.
- Nudge. Bedazzled Ink Publishing. 2014.
- All We Lack. Bedazzled Ink Publishing. 2015.
- State of Grace. Bywater Books. 2016. ISBN 978-1-612-94091-5.
