= Roan Parrish =

American author

Roan Parrish is an American author of gay romance fiction.

== Writing career ==
Parrish began writing gay romance fiction while pursuing a Ph.D in literature. She contributed the story "Company" to the collection All in Fear (2016). Her 2017 novel Out of Nowhere was shortlisted for Booklist's best genre fiction: romance and for RUSA's top romance genre fiction.

Riven (2018) was called "generous and tender in all the right ways" by Publishers Weekly. It received a starred review from Library Journal. Better than People (2020) received a starred review from Publishers Weekly: "Parrish [...] delivers an irresistible queer romance between a grumpy children’s book illustrator and a pathologically shy graphic designer". Best Laid Plans (2021) received a starred review from Publishers Weekly, which wrote, "Parrish’s sweet and sensitive treatment allows the men to become partners in healing. This love story is heartrending, swoon-worthy, and extremely well-told".

The Lights on Knockbridge Lane (2021) received a starred review from Publishers Weekly: "Parrish elevates what often can be formulaic in category romances to a fine art, with laugh-out-loud dialogue, eccentric but endearing characters, and an emotionally satisfying finale". The Rivals of Casper Road (2022) received a critical review from Publishers Weekly: "Parrish’s sweet but shallow fourth Garnet Run romance[...] leaves readers wanting more". Publishers Weekly called The Holiday Trap (2022) "a fluffy wintertime treat". It received a starred review from Library Journal that noted, "Readers will be captivated by the atmospheric settings, the witty dialogue, and the well-developed, adorably quirky characters in this stand-alone novel". Library Journal listed it as a best romance of 2022.

Parrish co-hosts the Dear Romance Writer podcast.

== Personal life ==
Parrish is Jewish and lives in Philadelphia. Parrish, who uses both she/her and they/them pronouns, is a member of the LGBT community.

== Selected works ==
- The Holiday Trap. Sourcebooks Casablanca. 2022. ISBN 978-1-72825-627-6.

=== In the Middle of Somewhere series ===
- In the Middle of Somewhere. Dreamspinner Press. 2015. ISBN 9781634762120.
- Out of Nowhere. Dreamspinner Press. 2016. ISBN 9781634769037.
- Where We Left Off. Dreamspinner Press. 2016. ISBN 9781634776905.

=== Riven series ===
- Riven. Loveswept. 2018. ISBN 9781524799328.
- Rend. Loveswept. 2018. ISBN 9781524799335.
- Raze. Loveswept. 2019. ISBN 9781984818331.

=== Garnet Run series ===
- Better Than People. Carina Adores. 2020. ISBN 978-1-335-54282-3.
- Best Laid Plans. Carina Adores. 2021. ISBN 978-1-335-92480-3.
- The Lights on Lockbridge Lane. Harlequin Special Edition. 2021. ISBN 978-1-335-40812-9.
- The Rivals of Casper Road. Harlequin Special Edition. 2022. ISBN 978-1-335-72420-5.
