= Johnny Diaz =

American journalist and novelist

- Born: Miami, Florida, U.S.
- Education: Florida International University
- Occupations: Journalist, author
- Writing career
- Period: 2000–present
- Genres: Gay romance, fiction
- Subjects: Business, Media

Johnny Diaz is an American novelist and a journalist for The New York Times. He previously worked for the Sun Sentinel, where he wrote local feature stories about South Florida, and as a media reporter for the business section of The Boston Globe.

== Early life and education ==
Diaz was born in Miami, Florida, and attended Florida International University.

== Career ==
He was a general assignment Metro reporter for the Miami Herald, where he worked on the staff that won the 2000 Pulitzer Prize for Breaking News Coverage "for its balanced and gripping on-the-scene coverage of the pre-dawn raid by federal agents that took the Cuban boy Elian Gonzalez from his Miami relatives and reunited him with his Cuban father." He also covered some of the biggest breaking stories in South Florida, including the murder of Gianni Versace.

Diaz worked for three years as a features writer for the Living/Arts section of The Boston Globe before moving to the newspaper's business section.

He was a featured contributor to the first Chicken Soup for the Latino Soul.

Diaz is the author of several gay-themed novels: Boston Boys Club, Miami Manhunt, Beantown Cubans, and Take the Lead. The television and film rights to Diaz' first three novels have been optioned by Open Road Integrated Media.

== Personal life ==
Diaz also works as a part-time journalism instructor at Emerson College in Boston. He is gay and his homosexuality became widely known in 1996 when his boyfriend was a cast member on the television series The Real World: Miami and Diaz appeared in several episodes.

== Novels ==
- Boston Boys Club (2007). ISBN 978-0-7582-1545-1
- Miami Manhunt (2008). ISBN 978-0-7582-6628-6
- Beantown Cubans (2009). ISBN 978-0-7582-3425-4
- Take the Lead (2011)
- Looking for Providence (2014)
