= Lee Winter =

Australian novelist

- Born: August 21, 1969 (age 57); Christchurch, New Zealand
- Occupations: Author, editor, and former print journalist
- Based: Perth, Western Australia

Writing career
- Period: 2014–present
- Genres: Romance, mystery, romantic blend, sci-fi
- Awards: GCLS Awards (multiple years)
- Literary movement: Lesbian literary
- Website: leewinterauthor.com

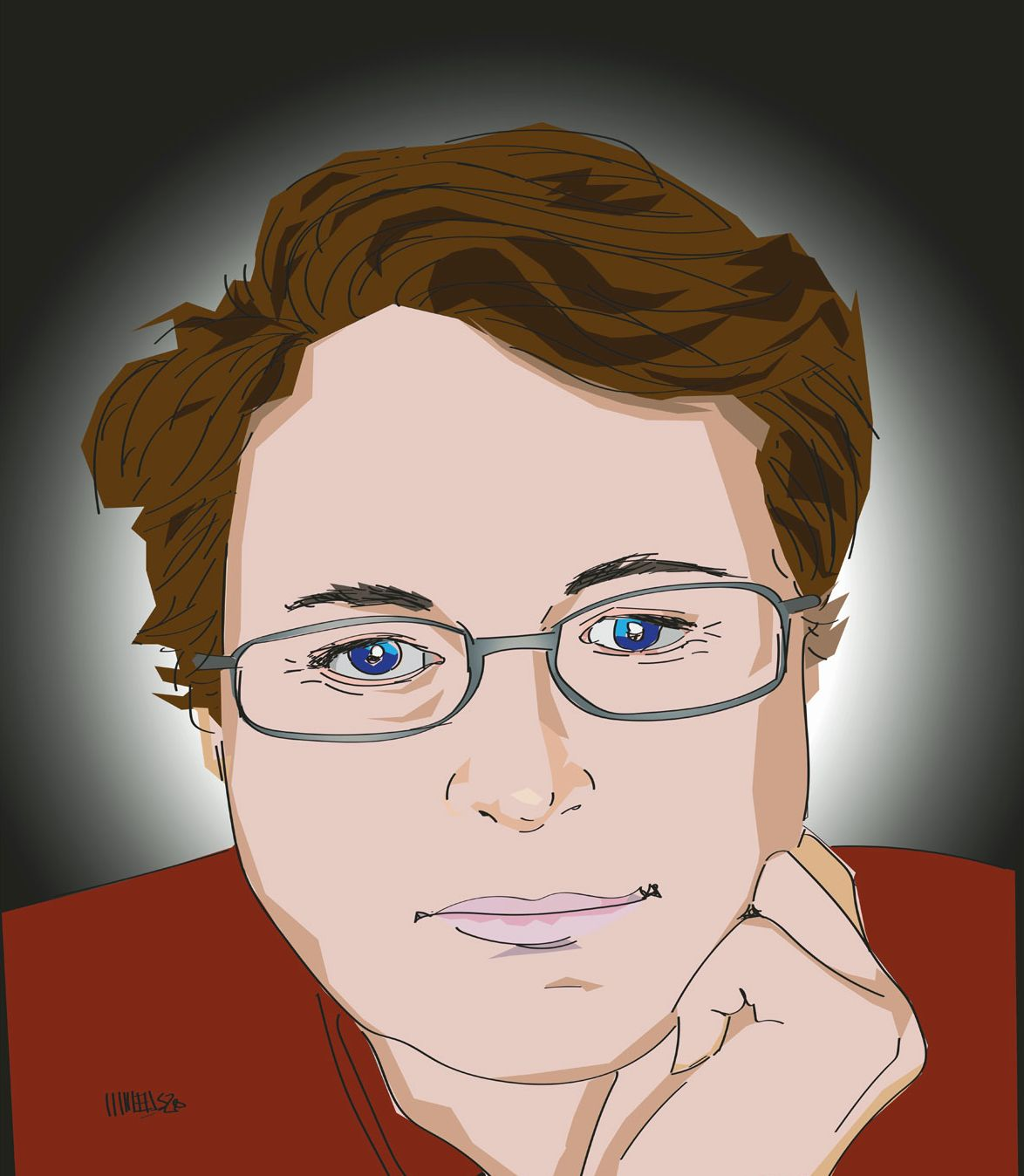
Lesbian fiction author Lee Winter. Illustration by Marcus Wells.

Lee Winter (born in Christchurch, New Zealand) is the pen name of an Australian journalist and novelist specializing in lesbian fiction.

== Biography ==
Lee Winter spent her early years growing up on the Gold Coast, Queensland, before her family moved to Brisbane. Originally, she had a three-decade career in journalism, winning awards for her work. Later, she became a novelist, specializing in lesbian fiction, covering genres from mystery and thriller to romance.

In 2015 Winter released the novel The Red Files; Marisol Cortez of Lesbians on the Loose described it as "a great read by a promising debut author", praised the writing and characters, and noted the inspiration from Winter's journalism career. In 2016, she wrote the novel Requiem for Immortals; Tara Scott of Lesbians on the Loose said, "if I want to read something from a different genre, it’s a relief to not have to leave lesfic to find it, and Requiem for Immortals perfectly scratches that itch." Both of these novels were nominated for the Lambda Literary Award for Lesbian Mystery and won the Golden Crown Literary Society for Mystery/Thriller: The Red Files in 2016 and Requiem for Immortals in 2017.

In 2017 she wrote the novel Shattered, which won the 2018 Golden Crown Literary Society Award for Science Fiction/Fantasy. In 2020, she wrote the novel Hotel Queens, which won the 2021 Golden Crown Literary Society Award for Romantic Blend.

In 2023 Winter started a new book series, The Villains, with The Fixer as the inaugural title. Writing for Autostraddle, Christina Tucker said of the book, "If you have ever known the joy and the pain of being totally head-over-heels invested in a slow burn, incomplete fanfic, then The Fixer is for you, I promise." The Fixer broke its publisher Ylva Publishing's record for most preorders.

That same year, Winter released another novel, Chaos Agent, which Tucker said "surprised [her] with its smart and heartfelt combination of questions about morality and ethics, as it concluded the story that began in The Fixer. Writing for AfterEllen, Claire Heuchan described The Villains as "a slick political thriller like Scandal if Olivia Pope was sapphic", noting that the relationship between the series' main characters Eden and Michelle was "the ultimate Opposites Attract romance". She was one of three winners of that year's Alice B Readers Award.

In 2024, Winter's Chaos Agent won for best Romantic Blend at the Golden Crown Literary Society (GCLS) Awards, as well as winning its top prize, the Ann Bannon Popular Choice Award (Gold). Winter won again for Romantic Blend for Vengeance Planning for Amateurs at the 2025 GCLS Awards. The book also took home Silver in the Ann Bannon Popular Choice Award.

According to Heuchan, Winter's novels include a "deep understanding of media, politics, and how power is structured".

Winter works as an editor part-time.

== Works ==
=== Novels ===
On the Record series

- The Red Files. Book 1. (2015) 2. Auflage. Ylva Publishing, Kriftel 2021, ISBN 978-3-96324-534-3.
- Under Your Skin. Book 2. Ylva Publishing, Kriftel 2018, ISBN 978-3-96324-026-3.

The Villains series

- The Fixer. Book 1. Ylva Publishing, Kriftel 2023, ISBN 978-3-96324-746-0.
- Chaos Agent. Book 2. Ylva Publishing, Kriftel 2023, ISBN 978-3-96324-749-1.
- Number Six. Book 3. Ylva Publishing, Kriftel 2025, ISBN 978-3-96324-982-2.

Standalone novels

- Requiem For Immortals. Ylva Publishing, Kriftel 2016, ISBN 978-3-95533-710-0.
- Shattered. Ylva Publishing, Kriftel 2017, ISBN 978-3-95533-563-2.
- The Brutal Truth. Ylva Publishing, Kriftel 2017, ISBN 978-3-95533-898-5.
- Breaking Character. Ylva Publishing, Kriftel 2018, ISBN 978-3-96324-113-0.
- Changing The Script. Ylva Publishing, Kriftel 2019, ISBN 978-3-96324-296-0.
- Hotel Queens. Ylva Publishing, Kriftel 2020, ISBN 978-3-96324-457-5.
- The Awkward Truth. Ylva Publishing, Kriftel 2021, ISBN 978-3-96324-583-1.
- Vengeance Planning for Amateurs. Ylva Publishing, Kriftel 2024, ISBN 978-3-96324-865-8.
- When She Flies. Ylva Publishing, Kriftel 2026, ISBN 978-3690061100.

=== Short fiction ===
- Love is Not Nothing. E-Book. Ylva Publishing, Kriftel 2017, ISBN 978-3-95533-872-5.
- Sliced Ice: Lee Winter's Iconic Ice Queens. Ylva Publishing, Kriftel 2021, ISBN 978-3-96324-530-5.
- When DC Loved Iowa. Ylva Publishing, Kriftel, 2025, ISBN 978-3690060103.

== Awards ==
Year	Title	Award	Result	Ref.
2016	The Red Files	Lambda Literary Award for Lesbian Mystery	Finalist	
2016	The Red Files	Golden Crown Literary Society Award for Mystery/Thriller	Won	
2017	Requiem for Immortals	Lambda Literary Award for Lesbian Mystery	Finalist	
2017	Requiem for Immortals	Golden Crown Literary Society Award for Mystery/Thriller	Won	
2018	Shattered	Golden Crown Literary Society Award for Science Fiction/Fantasy	Won	
2021	Hotel Queens	Golden Crown Literary Society Award for Romantic Blend	Won	
2023	Body of Work	Alice B Medal ~ Alice B Readers Award	Won	
2024	Chaos Agent	Golden Crown Literary Society Award for Romantic Blend Golden Crown Literary Society Ann Bannon Popular Choice (Gold)	Won	
2025	Vengeance Planning for Amateurs	Golden Crown Literary Society Award for Romantic Blend Golden Crown Literary Society Ann Bannon Popular Choice (Silver)	Won	
2026	Number Six	Golden Crown Literary Society Award for Romantic Blend Golden Crown Literary Society Ann Bannon Popular Choice (Silver)	Won	
