= Bella Books =

American publishing company

- Founded: 2001; 25 years ago
- Country of origin: United States
- Headquarters location: Tallahassee, Florida
- Distribution: Two Rivers Distribution
- Key people: Linda Hill, Publisher
- Fiction genres: Lesbian fiction
- Official website: www.bellabooks.com

Bella Books is a small press publisher of lesbian literature based in Tallahassee, Florida.

== History ==
Kelly Smith, along with other investors, created the corporation in Michigan in 1999 as an outgrowth of Smith's long relationship with A Woman's Prerogative Bookstore in Ferndale Michigan. Bella Books was named after a Jack Russell terrier who sat court at the bookstore. In 2004, Smith left the company and was replaced by the current chief executive officer Linda Hill, who is also the chief executive officer of Spinsters Ink and BeanPole Books. Hill moved the press to Tallahassee in 2005.

Since the publication of its first title in 2001, its primary focus has been on lesbian fiction. The press publishes lesbian romance, lesbian mystery and lesbian speculative fiction novels and lesbian erotica short-story anthologies. In 2003, it bought the backstock of Naiad Press, including the majority of the backlist for Jane Rule. In 2004, it bought the backstock of defunct Rising Tide Press. In 2005, it acquired distribution rights for New Victoria Press, including the works of Sarah Dreher. In 2008, it acquired reprint rights to the work of Ellen Hart. A typical production year includes 24-30 trade paperback releases as well as reprints of classic titles. Total titles in print exceeds 300.

Titles first appearing in English-speaking markets are translated for distribution in France (KTM Editions, Editions Dans L'Engrenage), Germany (Verlag Krug), Spain (Egales) and the Czech Republic (LePress). Some titles are also acquired for hardcover editions by InsightOut Book Club, a division of the Quality Paperback Book Club.

By 2012, the biggest part of the business was in distribution for small feminist and LGBT publishers.

== Awards ==
More than one hundred of its catalog titles have been shortlisted or have won Lambda Literary Awards or Golden Crown Literary Society Awards, and in 2004 it won the Lambda Literary Foundation's Independent LGBT Press Award.

== Notable authors ==
Notable authors include:

- Rhiannon Argo
- Nikki Baker
- Jessie Chandler
- Jeanne Córdova
- Lea Daley
- Katherine V. Forrest
- Nancy Garden
- Rachel Gold
- Ellen Hart
- Gerri Hill
- Heather Rose Jones
- Karin Kallmaker
- KG MacGregor
- Robbi McCoy
- Claire McNab
- Catherine Maiorisi
- MB Panichi
- Joanne Passet
- Emma Pérez
