= Georgia Beers =

American writer

Georgia Beers is an American writer of lesbian romance. Her novel Fresh Tracks won the Lambda Literary Award for Lesbian Romance.

Her novels have won 13 of the Golden Crown Literary Society's Goldie Awards, including six awards for romance, two Ann Bannon Popular Choice awards, two awards for non-erotic short story collections, and two awards for erotica.

== Personal life ==
Beers has lived in Rochester, New York her entire life and currently has a miniature Australian Shepherd, Finley.

Every year, she volunteers on the programming committee for ImageOut, Rochester, New York's annual LGBTQ film festival.

== Awards ==
| Year | Title | Award | Result | Ref. |
|---|---|---|---|---|
| 2006 | Fresh Tracks | Lambda Literary Award for Lesbian Romance | Won | |
| 2007 | Fresh Tracks | Goldie Award for Lesbian Romance | Won | |
| 2009 | Finding Home | Lambda Literary Award for Lesbian Romance | Nominated | |
| 2010 | Outsiders | Goldie Award for Short Story/Essay/Collections (Non-Erotica) | Won | |
| 2011 | Starting from Scratch | Lambda Literary Award for Lesbian Romance | Nominated | |
| 2011 | Starting from Scratch | Goldie Award for Traditional Romance | Won | |
| 2011 | Starting from Scratch | Ann Bannon Popular Choice Award | Won | |
| 2012 | 96 Hours | Goldie Award for Traditional Contemporary Romance | Won | |
| 2013 | Slices of Life | Goldie Award for Short Story/Essay Collection | Won | |
| 2015 | Olive Oil & White Bread | Ann Bannon Popular Choice Award | Won | |
| 2018 | Right Here, Right Now | Goldie Award for Contemporary Romance: Mid-Length Novels | Won | |
| 2018 | Blend | Goldie Award for Contemporary Romance: Mid-Length Novels | Won | |
| 2021 | Hopeless Romantic | Goldie Award for Contemporary Romance: Mid-Length Novels | Won | |
| 2021 | All I Want for Christmas | Goldie Award for Fiction Anthologies/Collections | Won | |
| 2024 | Dance with Me | Lambda Literary Award for Lesbian Romance | Won | |

== Publications ==
=== Novels ===
- Turning the Page (2001)
- Thy Neighbor's Wife (2003)
- Fresh Tracks (2006)
- Too Close to Touch (2006)
- Mine (2007)
- Finding Home (2008)
- Starting from Scratch (2010)
- 96 Hours (2011)
- Slices of Life (2012)
- Justice (2013)
- Working Girls #1: Firefighter (2013)
- Olive Oil and White Bread (2014)
- Snow Globe (2014)
- A Little Bit of Spice (2015)
- Zero Visibility (2015)
- Right Here, Right Now (2017)
- What Matters Most (2017)
- Blend (2018)
- Calendar Girl (2018)
- The Shape of You (2018)
- The Do-Over (2019)
- Fear of Falling (2019)
- One Walk in Winter (2019)
- 16 Steps to Forever (2020)
- Flavor of the Month (2020)
- Hopeless Romantic (2020)
- The Secret Poet (2021)

=== Balance series ===
- Balance (2014)
- Balance, Episode 2 (2014)

=== Puppy Love romance series ===
- Rescued Heart (2016)
- Run To You (2016)
- Dare to Stay (2017)

=== The Swizzle Stick romance series ===
- Shaken or Stirred (2021)
- On the Rocks (2021)
- With a Twist (2022)

=== Short story collections ===
- Outsiders, with Lynn Ames, J. D. Glass, Susan X. Meagher, and Susan Smith (2010)
- Call of The Wilde and Other Short Stories (2012)
- All I Want for Christmas, with Maggie Cummings and Fiona Riley (2020)

=== Anthology contributions ===
- The Milk of Human Kindness, edited by Lori L. Lake (2004)
- Stolen Moments, edited by Radclyffe and Stacia Seaman (2005)
- Extreme Passions, edited by Radclyffe and Stacia Seaman (2006)
- Blue Collar Lesbian Erotica, edited by Pat Cronin and Verda Foster (2008)
- Girls Next Door, edited by Sandy Lowe and Stacia Seaman (2017)
