= Jae (author) =

German author of lesbian fiction

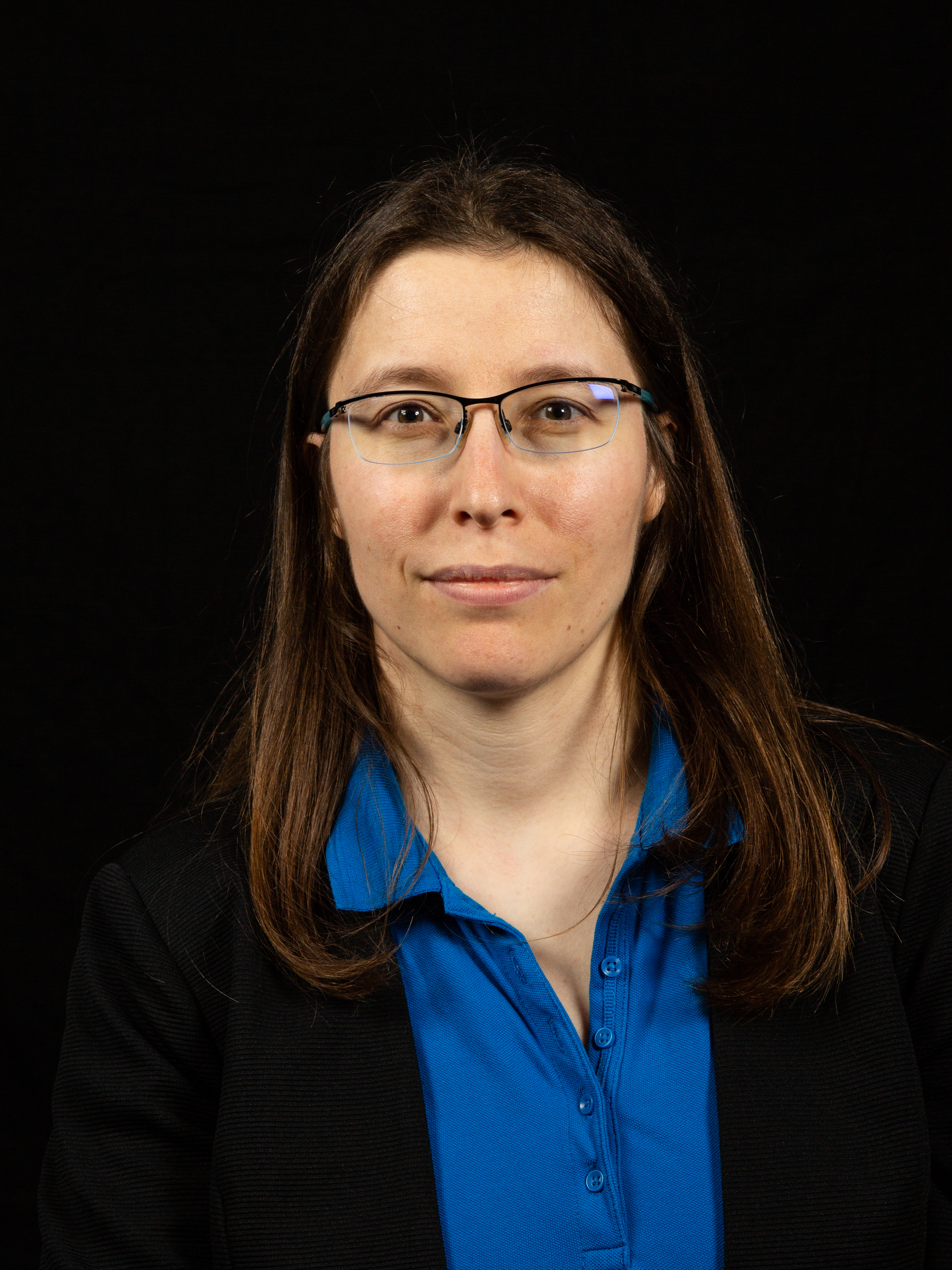
Jae at the Frankfurt Book Fair 2018

Jae (real name Sandra Gerth; born 19 March 1978 in Müllheim im Markgräflerland) is a German author of lesbian fiction. Her work is published in English, in German, and in French.

== Early life and education ==
Jae grew up in the southwestern corner of Germany and started writing at the age of eleven. She graduated from the University of Freiburg in 2004 with a degree in psychology. She worked as a psychologist until 2013, when she started writing full-time. She is also the senior editor at Ylva Publishing, one of the largest lesbian fiction publishing houses in the world.

== Writing career and awards ==
Her writing career began in 2007, when she published the first edition of Backwards to Oregon with L-Book ePublisher, a now-defunct publishing house. In 2012, she joined Ylva Publishing. She mostly writes lesbian romances across all subgenres, including contemporary romance, historical romance, paranormal romance, and romantic suspense. She writes her novels in English and then translates them into her native language, German.

Her works won numerous awards, among them:

- 2009: Lesbian Fiction Readers Choice Award for Second Nature (first edition)
- 2010: eLit Award (silver) in the category Gay/Lesbian for Second Nature (first edition)
- 2010: Golden Crown Literary Society Award in the category Historical Romance for Backwards to Oregon (first edition)
- 2010: Golden Crown Literary Society Award in the category Romantic Suspense for Next of Kin (first edition)
- 2010: Golden Crown Literary Society Award in the category Speculative Fiction for Second Nature (first edition)
- 2010: Rainbow Award for Excellence (first place) for Conflict of Interest (first edition)
- 2010: Rainbow Award for Excellence (third place) for Next of Kin (first edition)
- 2011: Lesbian Fiction Readers Choice Award for Hidden Truths (first edition)
- 2012: eLit Award (silver) in the category Gay/Lesbian for Something in the Wine
- 2012: Golden Crown Literary Society Award in the category Historical Romance for Hidden Truths (first edition)
- 2014: Golden Crown Literary Society Award in the category Anthology for Beyond the Trail
- 2014: Rainbow Award (second place) in the category Best Lesbian Contemporary and Erotic Romance for Departure from the Script
- 2014: Rainbow Award (second place) in the category Best Lesbian Paranormal Romance for True Nature
- 2015: Rainbow Award (third place) in the category Best Lesbian Contemporary and Erotic Romance for Under a Falling Star
- 2016: Golden Crown Literary Society Award in the category Paranormal/Horror for Good Enough to Eat
- 2016: Rainbow Award (third place) in the category Best Lesbian Contemporary and Erotic Romance for Just Physical
- 2016: Rainbow Award (third place) in the category Best Lesbian Historical & Paranormal Romance for Shaken to the Core
- 2017: Golden Crown Literary Society Award in the category Historical Fiction for Shaken to the Core
- 2017: Rainbow Award (first place) in the category Best Lesbian Contemporary and Erotic Romance for Heart Trouble
- 2017: Rainbow Award (second place) in the category Best Lesbian Contemporary and Erotic Romance for Falling Hard
- 2018: eLit Award (silver) in the category LGBT Fiction for Perfect Rhythm
- 2018: Golden Crown Literary Society Award in the category Contemporary Romance – Long Novels for Perfect Rhythm
- 2018: IPPY Award (bronze) in the category Best Romance/Erotica E-Book for Perfect Rhythm
- 2019: Lambda Literary Award for Lesbian Romance (finalist) for Just for Show
- 2020: Lambda Literary Award for Lesbian Romance (finalist) for The Roommate Arrangement
- 2021: Lambda Literary Award for Lesbian Romance (finalist) for Wrong Number, Right Woman
- 2021: Golden Crown Literary Society in the categories Ann Bannon Popular Choice and Contemporary Romance: Long Novels for Wrong Number, Right Woman
- 2021: Alice B Award
- 2022: Golden Crown Literary Society Award in the category Contemporary Romance – Mid-Length Novels for Chemistry Lessons
- 2022: Lambda Literary Award for Lesbian Romance (finalist) for Chemistry Lessons
- 2023: Golden Crown Literary Society in the category Ann Bannon Popular Choice for Just a Touch Away
- 2025: Golden Crown Literary Society in the category Ann Bannon Popular Choice for Bachelorette Number Twelve
- 2025: Lambda Literary Award for Lesbian Romance (finalist) for Bachelorette Number Twelve
- 2026: Golden Crown Literary Society in the categories Ann Bannon Popular Choice and Paranormal/Occult/Horror for Shifting Nature

== Personal ==
Jae lives in Freiburg im Breisgau, Germany.

== Works ==
Series

Standalone romances:

- Paper Love. Ylva Publishing, Kriftel 2018, ISBN 978-3-96324-066-9.
- Just for Show. Ylva Publishing, Kriftel 2018, ISBN 978-3-95533-980-7.
- Happily Ever After (short story collection). Ylva Publishing, Kriftel 2018, ISBN 978-3-96324-010-2.
- Perfect Rhythm. Ylva Publishing, Kriftel 2017, ISBN 978-3-95533-862-6.
- Falling Hard. Ylva Publishing, Kriftel 2017, ISBN 978-3-95533-829-9.
- Heart Trouble. Ylva Publishing, Kriftel 2016, ISBN 978-3-95533-732-2.
- Shaken to the Core. Ylva Publishing, Kriftel 2016, ISBN 978-3-95533-662-2.
- Under a Falling Star. Ylva Publishing, Kriftel 2014, ISBN 978-3-95533-238-9.

Hollywood series

- Departure from the Script. Ylva Publishing, Kriftel 2014, ISBN 978-3-95533-195-5.
- Damage Control. Ylva Publishing, Kriftel 2015, ISBN 978-3-95533-372-0.
- Dress-tease (short story). Ylva Publishing, Kriftel 2015, ISBN 978-3-95533-411-6.
- Just Physical. Ylva Publishing, Kriftel 2015, ISBN 978-3-95533-534-2.

Moonstone series

- Something in the Wine. Ylva Publishing, Kriftel 2012, ISBN 978-3-95533-793-3.
- Seduction for Beginners (short story). Ylva Publishing, Kriftel 2013, ISBN 978-3-95533-094-1.

Oregon series

- Backwards to Oregon. Ylva Publishing, Kriftel 2013, ISBN 978-3-95533-870-1.
- Beyond the Trail. Ylva Publishing, Kriftel 2013, ISBN 978-3-95533-083-5.
- Hidden Truths. Ylva Publishing, Kriftel 2014, ISBN 978-3-95533-119-1.
- Lessons in Love and Life (short story). Ylva Publishing, Kriftel, 2014, ISBN 978-3-95533-163-4.

Portland Police Bureau series

- Conflict of Interest. Ylva Publishing, Kriftel 2014, ISBN 978-3-95533-109-2.
- Next of Kin. Ylva Publishing, Kriftel 2015, ISBN 978-3-95533-403-1.
- Change of Pace (short story). Ylva Publishing, Kriftel 2015, ISBN 978-3-95533-479-6.

The Shape-Shifter series

- Manhattan Moon. Ylva Publishing, Kriftel 2012, ISBN 978-3-95533-013-2.
- Natural Family Disasters. Ylva Publishing, Kriftel 2013, ISBN 978-3-95533-107-8.
- True Nature. Ylva Publishing, Kriftel 2013, ISBN 978-3-95533-034-7.
- Second Nature. Ylva Publishing, Kriftel 2013, ISBN 978-3-95533-030-9.

The Vampire Diet series

- Co-authored with Alison Grey: Good Enough to Eat. Ylva Publishing, Kriftel 2015, ISBN 978-3-95533-242-6.
- Coitus Interruptus Dentalis (short story). Ylva Publishing, Kriftel 2015, ISBN 978-3-95533-422-2.

Audiobooks

- Under a Falling Star. Ylva Publishing, Kriftel 2016
- Something in the Wine. Ylva Publishing, Kriftel 2018
- Perfect Rhythm. Tantor Audio 2018
- Paper Love. Tantor Audio 2018
- Just for Show. Tantor Audio 2018
