= Ellen Hart =

American novelist (born 1949)

- Born: August 10, 1949 (age 77)
- Occupation: Novelist
- Writing career
- Years active: 1989–present
- Genres: Mystery fiction, LGBT fiction
- Notable works: Jane Lawless series, Sophie Greenway series
- Notable awards: Mystery Writers of America Grand Master; 5-time Lambda Literary Award winner Golden Crown Literary Society Trailblazer Award

Ellen Hart (born August 10, 1949) is the award-winning mystery author of the Jane Lawless and Sophie Greenway series. Born in Maine, she was a professional chef for 14 years. Hart's mysteries include culinary elements similar to those of Diane Mott Davidson.

== Life and career ==
The author says of her work, "I don't write about the Mean Streets. I don't live there .... I don't do lots of blood and gore. I don't do sex scenes in any great detail. I'd never kill a dog or a cat. I guess you could call my style, maximal suspense and minimal gore." Hart is openly lesbian. Her Jane Lawless series features a lesbian restaurateur and her smart mouth best friend, Cordelia Thorn. The Jane Lawless series began in 1989 and is an early post-Stonewall example of the mystery genre in lesbian literature. Hart's novels deal with LGBT issues and five of the Lawless series have won Lambda Literary Awards.

Dubbed the "lesbian answer to Agatha Christie, " for her Jane Lawless series, Hart also pens the culinary Sophie Greenway mystery series. She frequently tours and lectures on the craft of mystery writing. She has contributed to numerous crime writer anthologies including Resort to Murder: Thirteen More Tales of Mystery by Minnesota's Premier Writers.

In 2005, Hart was awarded one of the earliest Alice B Readers Awards honoring writers whose careers are distinguished by consistently well-written work featuring lesbians and feminist storylines. The same year, she was also inducted into the Saints and Sinners Hall of Fame, joining literary greats such as Dorothy Allison, Felice Picano, Katherine V. Forrest, and many others.

At the 2007 annual meeting of the Golden Crown Literary Society, Hart was the keynote speaker. Nominated twenty-three times for the Lambda Literary Award, Hart has won six. She has also been nominated for the Minnesota Book Awards four times (in 1995, 1996, 2006, and 2016) and won all four.

In 2010, Hart won the Trailblazer Award from the Golden Crown Literary Society which honors the contributions of lesbian writers. Previous winners include Ann Bannon, Jane Rule, and Lee Lynch. In 2017, she became the first openly LGBT writer to be named a Grand Master by the Mystery Writers of America.

She is a founding member of The Minnesota Crime Wave along with Twin Cities crime-fiction writers Carl Brookins and William Kent Krueger. The Minnesota Crime Wave's TV show about mysteries and writing airs on CTV-15 in the Twin Cities or episodes can be seen at MinnesotaCrimeWave.org.

Hart has taught introductory classes for mystery writers at The Loft Literary Center in Minneapolis for many years. She and Kathy, her partner of over forty years, lived in Minneapolis until 2012 when they downsized and now live in Eden Prairie, Minnesota.

== Awards and honors ==
In 2010, Ellen Hart received the Golden Crown Literary Society's Trailblazer Award.

Awards for Hart's writing
Year	Work	Award	Result	Ref.
1990	Hallowed Murder	Lambda Literary Award for Lesbian Mystery	Finalist	
1993	Stage Fright	Lambda Literary Award for Lesbian Mystery	Finalist	
1995	A Small Sacrifice	Lambda Literary Award for Lesbian Mystery	Winner	
1995	A Small Sacrifice	Minnesota Book Award for Mystery & Detective	Winner	
1996	Faint Praise	Lambda Literary Award for Lesbian Mystery	Finalist	
1996	Faint Praise	Minnesota Book Award for Mystery & Detective	Winner	
1997	Robber's Wine	Lambda Literary Award for Lesbian Mystery	Winner	
1999	Wicked Games	Lambda Literary Award for Lesbian Mystery	Finalist	
2000	Hunting the Witch	Lambda Literary Award for Lesbian Mystery	Winner	
2002	The Merchant of Venus	Lambda Literary Award for Lesbian Mystery	Winner	
2003	Immaculate Midnight	Lambda Literary Award for Lesbian Mystery	Winner	
2005	An Intimate Ghost	Golden Crown Literary Society Award for Mystery	Winner	
2005	An Intimate Ghost	Lambda Literary Award for Lesbian Mystery	Finalist	
2006	The Iron Girl	Golden Crown Literary Society Award for Mystery	Winner	
2006	The Iron Girl	Minnesota Book Award for Popular Fiction	Winner	
2006	The Iron Girl	Lambda Literary Award for Lesbian Mystery	Finalist	
2007	Night Vision	Lambda Literary Award for Lesbian Mystery	Finalist	
2008	The Mortal Groove	Golden Crown Literary Society Award for Dramatic General Fiction	Winner	
2008	The Mortal Groove	Lambda Literary Award for Lesbian Mystery	Finalist	
2009	Sweet Poison	Lambda Literary Award for Lesbian Mystery	Finalist	
2010	The Mirror and the Mask	Lambda Literary Award for Lesbian Mystery	Finalist	
2011	The Cruel Ever After	Golden Crown Literary Society Award for Mystery	Nominee	
2011	The Cruel Ever After	Lambda Literary Award for Lesbian Mystery	Finalist	
2013	Rest for the Wicked	Lambda Literary Award for Lesbian Mystery	Finalist	
2014	Taken by the Wind	Lambda Literary Award for Lesbian Mystery	Finalist	
2015	The Old Deep and Dark	Lambda Literary Award for Lesbian Mystery	Winner	
2016	The Grave Soul	Minnesota Book Award for Genre Fiction	Winner	
2018	Fever in the Dark	Lambda Literary Award for Lesbian Mystery	Finalist	
2019	A Whisper of Bones	Lambda Literary Award for Lesbian Mystery	Finalist	
2020	Twisted at the Root	Lambda Literary Award for Lesbian Mystery	Finalist	

== Published works ==
=== Anthology contributions ===
- Murder, They Wrote, edited by Martin H. Greenberg and Elizabeth Foxwell (1997)
- The Milk of Human Kindness, edited by Lori L. Lake (2004)
- Writes of Spring: Stories and Prose, edited by Gary Schulze and Pat Frovarp (2012)
- Malice Domestic 15: Mystery Most Theatrical (2020)

=== Anthologies edited ===
- Resort to Murder, edited with Carl Brookins (2007)

=== Jane Lawless series ===
1. Hallowed Murder (1989)
2. Vital Lies (1991)
3. Stage Fright (1992)
4. A Killing Cure (1993)
5. A Small Sacrifice (1994)
6. Faint Praise (1995)
7. Robber's Wine (1996)
8. Wicked Games (1998)
9. Hunting The Witch (1999)
10. The Merchant of Venus (2001)
11. Immaculate Midnight (2001)
12. An Intimate Ghost (2004)
13. The Iron Girl (2005)
14. Night Vision (2006)
15. The Mortal Groove (2007)
16. Sweet Poison (2008)
17. The Mirror and the Mask (2009)
18. The Cruel Ever After (2010)
19. The Lost Women of Lost Lake (2011)
20. Rest for the Wicked (2012)
21. Taken by the Wind (2013)
22. The Old Deep and Dark (2014)
23. The Grave Soul (2015)
24. Fever in the Dark (2017)
25. A Whisper of Bones (2018)
26. Twisted at the Root (2019)
27. In A Midnight Wood (2020)

=== Sophie Greenway series ===
1. This Little Piggy Went to Murder (1994)
2. For Every Evil (1995)
3. The Oldest Sin (1996)
4. Murder in the Air (1997)
5. Slice and Dice (2000)
6. Dial M For Meat Loaf (2001)
7. Death on a Silver Platter (2003)
8. No Reservations Required (2005)
