= Regal Crest Enterprises =

American gay/lesbian publisher

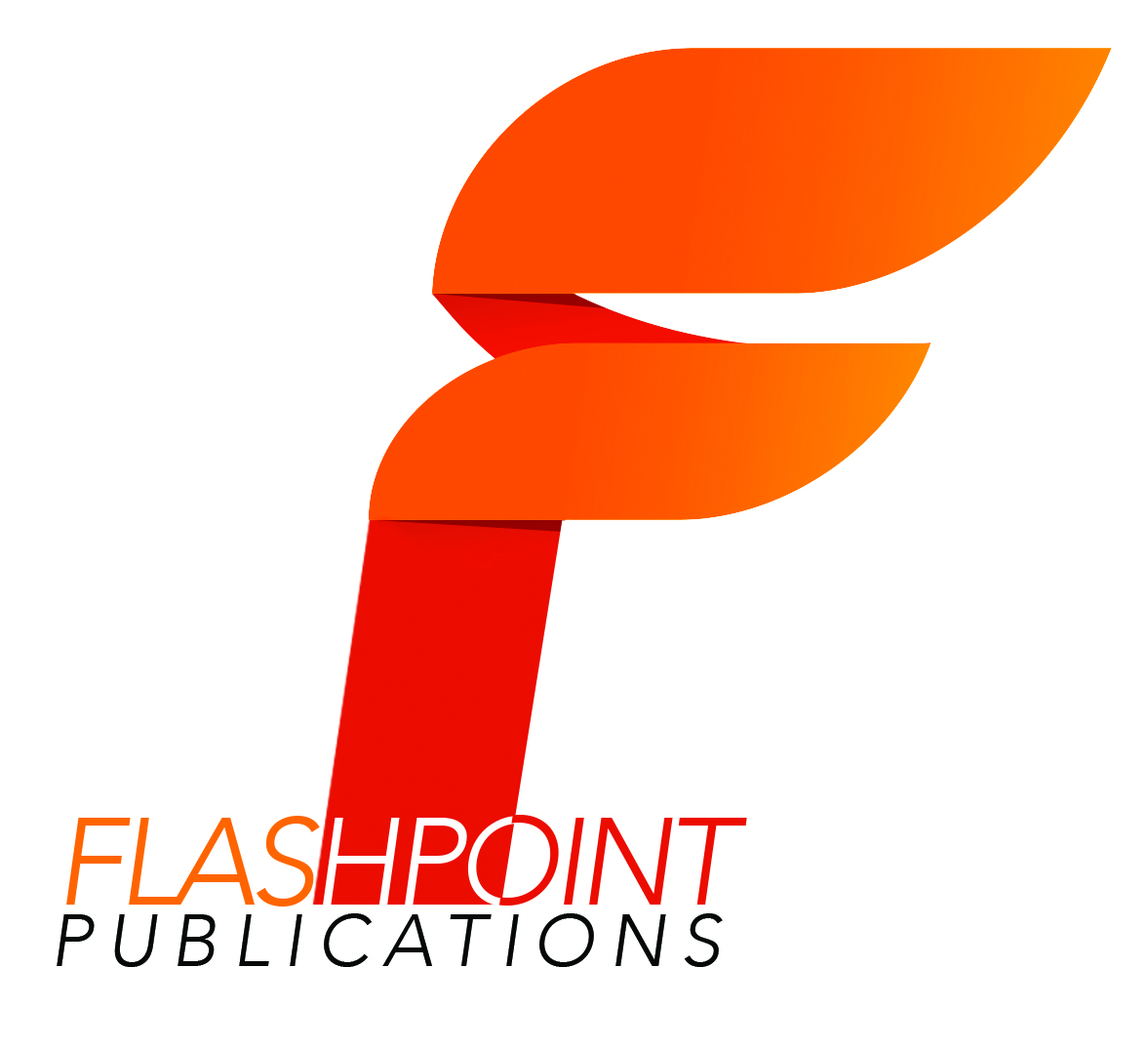
- Founded: 1999
- Successor: Flashpoint Productions
- Country of origin: United States
- Headquarters location: Bethel, Ohio
- Publication types: Novels, anthologies, collections
- Nonfiction topics: Lesbian, queer writing
- Fiction genres: Lesbian fiction, gay literature
- Official website: www.flashpointpublications.com

Regal Crest Enterprises (RCE), established 1999, is a small press publisher of lesbian literature. As of January 1, 2021, RCE became an imprint of Flashpoint Publications and is based in Ohio.

Since the publication of its first title in 1999, RCE's primary focus has been on lesbian fiction, though some other titles have also been issued. The press publishes mostly in the genres of lesbian romance, lesbian mystery, lesbian essays and collections, lesbian speculative fiction novels, and lesbian erotica short-story anthologies along with some gay fiction works, particularly in the realm of sci-fi and romance. Reviewers at The Lesbian Review have generally been very upbeat about the quality and variety of books published by this press. Prior to the merger, books from Flashpoint Publications were also reviewed favorably by The Lesbian Review.

A typical year includes 10 - 14 trade paperback releases. Total titles in publication currently exceed 120.

A number of RCE authors have won Golden Crown Literary Society Awards, and one author has been shortlisted for a Lambda Literary Awards. Various other awards have been received as well, including those offered by The Alice B Readers Award and The Rainbow Awards.

Authors with award-winning books include:

- Brenda Adcock
- Kelly Aten
- Renée Bess
- Verda Foster
- Melissa Good
- Lori L. Lake
- KE Lane
- Kate McLachlan
- Patty Schramm
