= Andrea Bramhall =

British writer

Andrea Bramhall (born 26 January 1979) is a British writer. Her novel Clean Slate won the Lambda Literary Award for Lesbian Romance. She's also been a finalist for the Lambda Literary Award for Lesbian Romance twice and Lambda Literary Award for Lesbian Mystery twice.

== Biography ==
Bramhall was born in Stockport, England, though she currently lives in Norfolk with her partner.

Bramhill received a Bachelor of Arts in Contemporary Arts from Manchester Metropolitan University in 2002.

== Awards ==
Awards for Bramhall's writing
Year	Title	Award	Result	Ref.
2013	Ladyfish	Alice B. Lavender Certificate	Recipient	
2013	Ladyfish	Rainbow Award for Debut Lesbian Novel	Finalist	
2014	Clean Slate	Lambda Literary Award for Lesbian Romance	Winner	
2015	Nightingale	Goldie Award for Traditional Contemporary Romance	Winner	
2015	Nightingale	Lambda Literary Award for Lesbian Romance	Finalist	
2016	The Chameleon’s Tale	Lambda Literary Award for Lesbian Romance	Finalist	
2017	Collide-O-Scope	Goldie Award for Mystery/Thriller	Finalist	
2017	Collide-O-Scope	Lambda Literary Award for Lesbian Mystery	Finalist	
2018	The Last First Time	Lambda Literary Award for Lesbian Mystery	Finalist	
2018	Rock and a Hard Place	Goldie Award for Contemporary Romance (Long Novels)	Finalist	

== Publications ==
- Clean Slate (2013)
- Nightingale (2014)
- The Chameleon's Tale (2015)
- Just My Luck (2016)
- Rock and a Hard Place (2017)
- Lost for Words (2018)

=== Finnsbury series ===
- Ladyfish (2012)
- Swordfish (2015)

=== Norfolk Coast Investigation series ===
- Collide-O-Scope (2016)
- Under Parr (2017)
- The Last First Time (2017)

=== Anthology contributions ===
- L Is For: A UK Lesfic Anthology, edited by Jayne Fereday (2014)
- Language of Love, edited by Astrid Ohletz and Lee Winter (2018)
