= Lynn Ames =

American writer (born 1960)

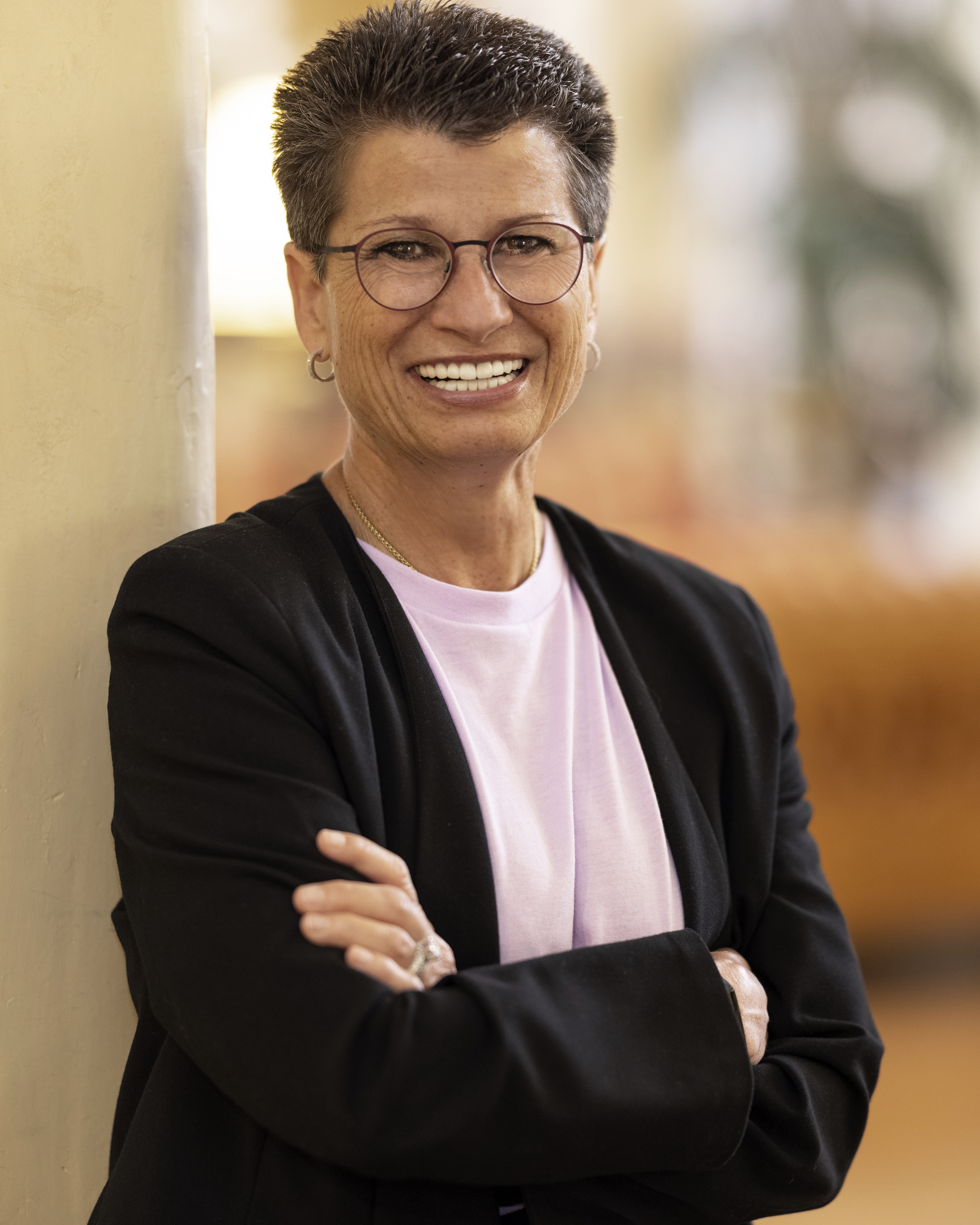
- Lynn Ames
- Born: October 10, 1960 (age 65); New York
- Education: Middlebury College
- Known for: The Mission: Classified Series, The Kate & Jay Series, and Out at the Plate: The Dot Wilkinson Story
- Notable work: Fiction and Nonfiction
- Awards: Golden Crown Literary Society Winner, The Alice B Readers Award, Ann Bannon Award, Lambda Literary Award Finalist
- Website: www.lynnames.com

Lynn Ames (born October 10, 1960) is an American writer whose works feature female protagonists, past and present. She has authored sixteen novels spanning a variety of genres, including historical fiction, thrillers, and LGBTQ+ romance, and a biography of softball player and bowler Dot Wilkinson. Ames has collected six Goldie Awards from the Golden Crown Literary Society (GCLS) and was keynote speaker at the 2023 GCLS annual conference. Her contemporary romance novel, All That Lies Within, won the GCLS Ann Bannon Popular Choice Award in 2013 and was a Lambda Literary Award finalist for Lesbian Romance.

== Early life and education ==
In 1982, she graduated cum laude from Middlebury College with a bachelor's degree in history and a minor in psychology. She received the Marci J. Stewart Award for “the student in history who has shown outstanding personal and academic qualities.”

== Early professional career ==
Ames began her career as a broadcast journalist, news anchor, and news director for WQBK AM & FM, a radio station in Albany, New York. In 1987, she was named press secretary to New York State Senate Minority Leader Manfred Ohrenstein. In 1989, Governor Mario Cuomo tapped her to become spokesperson for the New York State Department of Corrections and Community Supervision, then the third-largest prison system in the country.

In 2001, after a six-year stint as Vice President of the New York State Credit Union Association, Ames established her own public relations firm where she specialized in image, crisis communications planning, and crisis management.

== Writing career ==
In 2004, Ames published her first novel, The Price of Fame, with Intaglio Publications. Her next four novels also were published by Intaglio. In 2010, Ames took back the rights to all of her works and created Phoenix Rising Press. In addition to issuing second editions of her first five novels, Phoenix Rising Press became publisher of record for her eleven subsequent works of fiction.

== Writing influences ==
Ames draws on her experience as a journalist and governmental spokesperson to create plots and characters. This is particularly notable in The Price of Fame, the first book in the Kate & Jay series. As described in The Lesbian Review, Jay “is in Albany to interview the Governor of New York when she turns on the TV in her hotel room and sees a face she’s been thinking about for five years.” Kate “is at the state capitol building, covering the wreckage after an explosion and helping as many survivors as she can.” The two women reconnect, resulting in a “page turner” that is “a lot of fun to read.”

In reviewing Chain Reactions, a Writer’s Digest honorable mention for genre fiction, Lambda Literary advised “readers who enjoy a blend of contemporary and historical fiction” to pick up the book, as it is “fascinating, compelling, and well-researched, giving a glimpse into what will be for many a little-known contribution women made to the war effort in WWII.”

Ames also has won a Goldie Award and other recognition for her humorous novel Great Bones, published in 2018, and for other comedic work.

== Personal ==
Ames resides in Asheville, North Carolina, with her wife, Cheryl Pletcher.

== Works ==
(All works published by Phoenix Rising Press unless noted)

=== Nonfiction ===
- Out at the Plate: The Dot Wilkinson Story (2023), Chicago Review Press, ISBN 9781641609999

=== Series ===
==== Kate & Jay series ====
- The Price of Fame (2003, 2nd edition 2010) ISBN 9780984052141
- The Cost of Commitment (2004, 2nd edition 2010) ISBN 9780984052158
- The Value of Valor (2005, 2nd edition 2010) ISBN 9780984052165
- Final Cut (2016) ISBN 9781936429127

==== Mission: Classified series ====
- Beyond Instinct (2011) ISBN 9781936429028
- Above Reproach (2012) ISBN 9781936429042

=== Standalone fiction ===
==== Historical fiction ====
- Eyes on the Stars (2010) ISBN 9781936429004
- Bright Lights of Summer (2014) ISBN 9781936429103
- Secrets Well Kept (2019) ISBN 9781936429189

==== Contemporary romance ====
- Heartsong (2007, 2nd edition 2010) ISBN 9780984052134
- One ~ Love (2010) ISBN 9780984052127
- All That Lies Within (2013) ISBN 9781936429066
- Chain Reactions (2019) ISBN 9781936429165
- 46 (2020) ISBN 9781936429202

==== Romantic comedy ====
- Great Bones (2018) ISBN 9781936429141

==== Anthologies and collections ====
- “In a Flash” (included in Outsiders, a collection of five short stories, published by Brisk Press, 2009) ISBN 0-979-92545-2
- Selected love poems (included in "Roses Read", edited by Beth Mitchum, published by UltraVioletLove Publishing, 2013) ASIN: B00B2FA78W
- “It’s a Dog’s Life” (included in Lesbians on the Loose: Crime Writers on the Lam, edited by Lori L. Lake and Jessie Chandler, published by Launch Point Press, 2015) ISBN 9781633040311e

==== Novelty works ====
- Digging for Home (2014) ISBN 9781936429080
- A Christmas Tail (2015 – Kindle only) ASIN: B019MZNDJI

== Awards and other recognition ==
- 2007 - The Value of Valor, Arizona Book Award Winner - Best Gay/Lesbian Book
- 2010 - Outsiders, Golden Crown Literary Society Award Winner - Short Story/Essay/Collections (Lynn Ames, Georgia Beers, JD Glass, Susan X. Meagher and Susan Smith)
- 2011 - Eyes on the Stars, Golden Crown Literary Society Winner - Historical Romance
- 2012 - Beyond Instinct, Golden Crown Literary Society Award Winner - Mystery/Thriller
- 2013 - All That Lies Within, Lambda Literary Award Finalist - Lesbian Romance
- 2014 - All That Lies Within, Ann Bannon Popular Choice Award Winner
- 2015 - Bright Lights of Summer, Golden Crown Literary Society Award Winner - Historical Fiction
- 2016 - Final Cut, Lambda Literary Award Finalist - Lesbian Romance
- 2017 - Final Cut, Golden Crown Literary Society Award Winner - Romantic Suspense/Intrigue/Adventure
- 2018 - Great Bones, Foreword INDIES Book of the Year Award Finalist - Humor
- 2019 - Great Bones, Golden Crown Literary Society Award Winner – Humorous Novel
- 2019 - Chain Reactions, Writer's Digest Self-Published Book Awards Honorable Mention - Genre Fiction
- 2020 - The Alice B Readers Award for Outstanding Body of Work
- 2024 - Out at the Plate: The Dot Wilkinson Story, Foreword INDIES Gold Award Winner - LGBTQ+ Adult Nonfiction
