= Golden Crown Literary Society =

American nonprofit organization

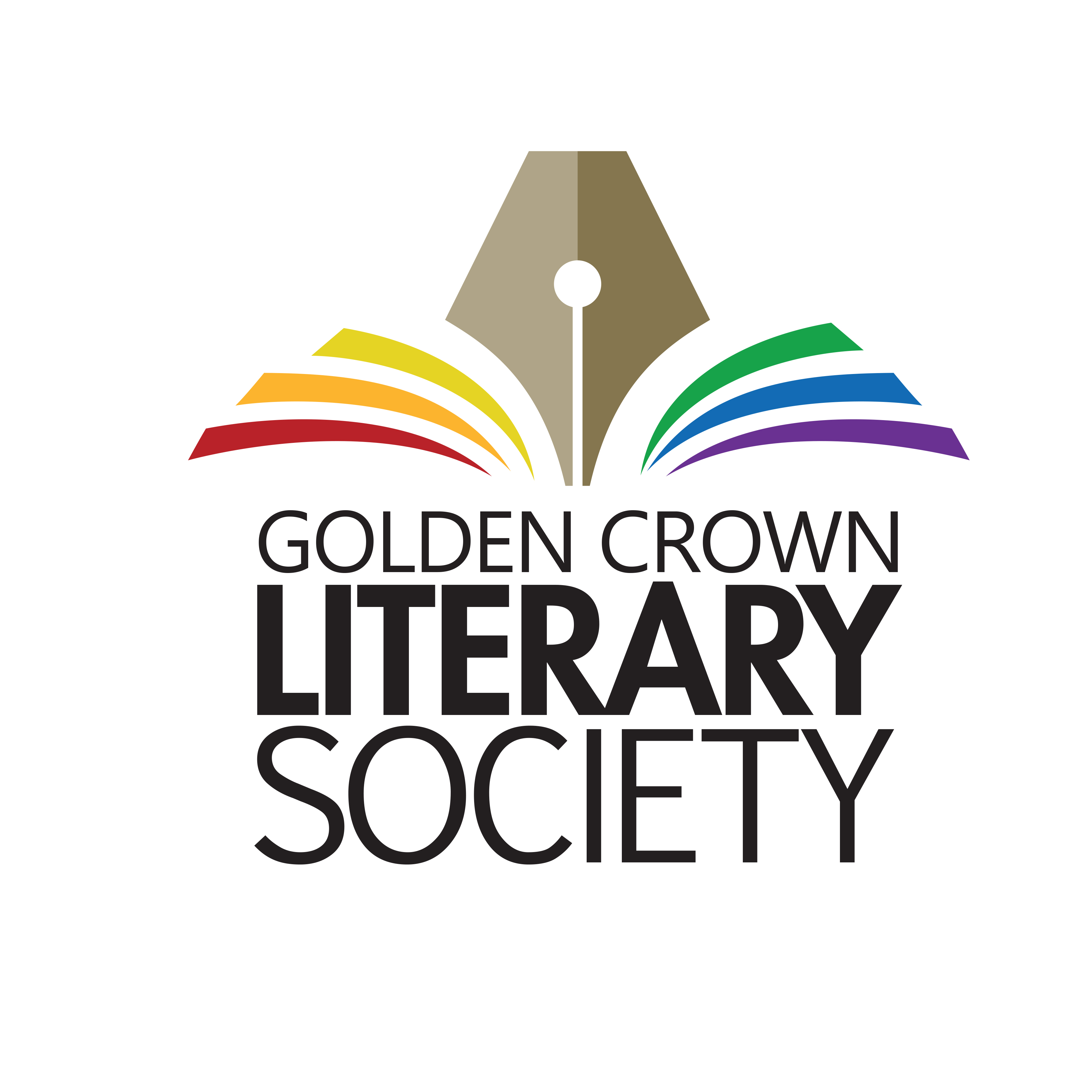
- Established: 2004; 22 years ago
- Website: www.goldencrownliterarysociety.org

Golden Crown Literary Society (GCLS) is an American nonprofit organization established in 2004 for those with an interest in Sapphic literature. Since 2005, GCLS has at its annual conference presented Golden Crown Literary Awards (Goldies) to authors and editors in various categories of fiction, non-fiction, poetry and anthologies/collections, as well as for cover design and audiobook narration.

== History ==
The Golden Crown Literary Society was established in 2004 as a response to lesbian presses and authors being ignored by other awarding agencies. By its third annual conference in 2007 in Atlanta, participants had grown from 30 to nearly 300.

The five women who founded GCLS were on its original advisory board: Carrie Carr, Cathy LeNoir Bryerose, Lori L. Lake, Radclyffe, and Kathy L. Smith. In 2006, Bryerose became the first executive director, followed by Smith (2007 to 2008), Patty Schramm (2009 to 2013), Liz Gibson (2013 to 2016), Mary Phillips (2016 to 2021), Ann Roberts (2021 to 2022), and Betsy Carswell (2022 to the present).During Carswell's first term as president, GCLS changed the organization from a membership organization to a board-only controlled org. Between 2019 and 2022, GCLS updated its mission statement and organizational language to describe its focus as "sapphic" literature rather than exclusively "lesbian" literature. The organization stated that the change was intended to better reflect a broader community that includes women-loving-women as well as bisexual, transgender, non-binary, genderqueer, and other LGBTQ+ authors and readers whose work falls within the sapphic literary tradition.

Since 2005, GCLS has held an annual conference at which Goldies are presented in categories of Sapphic literature. In 2014, a writing academy was opened for new and upcoming authors, including one-on-one mentoring and in-class instruction. In 2017, the GCLS board added a director of inclusion to emphasize diversity. In 2021, a free, virtual series was launched via Zoom to cover LGBTQ topics, complementing regional events organized by GCLS that offered in-person panels, book sales and author signings. By 2025, attendance at the annual GCLS conference had grown to nearly 400 participants, approximately one-third of whom were first-time attendees.

In 2016, GCLS launched the GCLS Writing Academy, a nine-month educational program focused on the development of sapphic fiction writers. The program was established as part of the organization's educational mission and offered master classes, mentorship, scholarships, payment plans, and structured coursework for writers at multiple stages of their careers. Students received instruction from published authors within the sapphic literary community and completed coursework between September and June, culminating in a graduation ceremony held during the annual GCLS conference.

Over time, the Writing Academy expanded into multiple instructional tracks covering novel-writing fundamentals, revision, publishing, and book marketing. Faculty and guest instructors included established authors such as E.J. Noyes, Melissa Brayden, Aurora Rey, Lynn Ames, Karin Kallmaker, Jen Lyon, Bryce Oakley, J.J. Arias, Clare Ashton, Kimberly Cooper-Griffin, and Anna Burke.

On May 11, 2026, Mother's Day, GCLS announced via email that the Writing Academy would be placed on a "strategic pause" to evaluate the program's long-term structure, including the possibility of offering educational content in alternative formats.. This change announced and signed exclusively by the executive board of directors.

== Trailblazer Award and Lee Lynch Classic Award ==
The Trailblazer Award has been given at the annual conference since 2005 to a lesbian writer for contributions to lesbian literature. The Lee Lynch Classic Award was added in 2012 to recognize books with influential historical value. Past winners include:

- 2026 - Trailblazer Award: Jean M. Redmann; Lee Lynch Classic: Memory Mambo by Achy Obejas, Orlando
- 2025 - Trailblazer Award: Penny Mickelbury; Lee Lynch Classic: Trash by Dorothy Allison, Las Vegas
- 2024 - Trailblazer Award: Lesléa Newman; Lee Lynch Classic: Desert of the Heart by Jane Rule, Minneapolis
- 2023 - Trailblazer Award: Alison Bechdel; Lee Lynch Classic: Home Girls: A Black Feminist Anthology edited by Barbara Smith, Denver
- 2022 - Trailblazer Award: Elana Dykewomon; Lee Lynch Classic: Patience and Sarah by Isabel Miller, Albuquerque
- 2021 - Trailblazer Award: Pat Parker; Lee Lynch Classic: Zami: A New Spelling of My Name by Audre Lorde, Virtual Conference
- 2020 - Trailblazer Award: Barbara Wilson; Lee Lynch Classic: The Wanderground: Stories of the Hill Women by Sally Miller Gearhart, Virtual conference (Covid pandemic)
- 2019 - Trailblazer Award: Sandra Scoppettone; Lee Lynch Classic: Loving Her by Ann Allen Shockley, Pittsburgh
- 2018 - Trailblazer Award: Dorothy Allison; Lee Lynch Classic: Riverfinger Women by Elana Dykewomon, Las Vegas
- 2017 - Trailblazer Award: Lillian Faderman; Lee Lynch Classic: Heather Has Two Mommies by Leslea Newman, Chicago
- 2016 - Trailblazer Award: Jewelle Gomez; Lee Lynch Classic: Curious Wine by Katherine V. Forrest Washington, DC
- 2015 - Trailblazer Award: Joan Nestle; Lee Lynch Classic: Rubyfruit Jungle by Rita Mae Brown, New Orleans
- 2014 - Trailblazer Award: Judy Grahn; Lee Lynch Classic: Annie on My Mind, Nancy Garden, Portland
- 2013 - Trailblazer Award: Marijane Meaker; Lee Lynch Classic: Spring Fire by Marijane Meaker writing as Vin Packer, Dallas
- 2012 - Trailblazer Award: Marianne K. Martin; Lee Lynch Classic: Swashbuckler by Lee Lynch, Minneapolis
- 2011 - Trailblazer Award: Karin Kallmaker, Orlando
- 2010 - Trailblazer Award: Ellen Hart, Orlando
- 2009 - Trailblazer Award: Lee Lynch, Orlando
- 2008 - Trailblazer Award: Katherine V. Forrest, Phoenix
- 2007 - Trailblazer Award: Jane Rule, Atlanta
- 2006 - Trailblazer Award: Sarah Aldridge, Atlanta
- 2005 - Trailblazer Award: Ann Bannon, New Orleans

Called "a night to remember" by The Advocate, trailblazers Lee Lynch and Dorothy Allison and Lee Lynch Classic winner Rita Mae Brown shared a stage for the first time at the 2015 Goldies ceremony. Also that night, Geonn Cannon became the first male writer to win two Goldies, and Jacob Anderson-Minshall was the first openly transgender author to win. He shared the award with Diane Anderson-Minshall for Queerly Beloved: A Love Story Across Genders.

The 2019 Goldies ceremony included the world premiere of the feature-length documentary In Her Words: 20th Century Lesbian Fiction. Co-directed by Lisa Marie Evans and Trailblazer Marianne K. Martin, the film explores and preserves the documents that dominated lesbian-themed literature in the 20th century.

== Goldie Awards ==
The Goldies are annual literary awards: as of 2026, they are selected for "excellence in sapphic and women-loving-women literature", and in the past, they have been bestowed for "excellence in Lesbian-themed Literature". The Goldies have expanded from four judged categories in 2005 to 11 in 2013 to 18 in 2026, along with two popular choice awards.

In recent years, Goldie entries have been submitted by large publishers (e.g., Farrar Straus Giroux, Hatchette Book Group, Macmillian Publishers, St. Martin's Press and Tantor Media), mid-size publishers (e.g., Bold Strokes Books and Skyhorse Publishing), small press publishers (e.g., Aesculus Books, Bedazzled Ink, Bella Books, Blue Feather Books, Brisk Press, Bywater Books, Copper Canyon Press, Desert Palm Press, Flashpoint Publications, Launch Point Press, Midnight Ink, Sapphfic Publishing, Sapphire Books, Spinsters Ink, Regal Crest and Ylva Publishing), university press houses and self-publishing enterprises.

Named after "the queen of lesbian pulp fiction", the Ann Bannon Popular Choice Award was established in 2007. Currently, Ann Bannon awards recognize three books rated by judges as being of highest quality, and then by popular vote as favorites among the books determined by judges to be finalists.

Established in 2015 to honor "one of the most visible and accessible lesbian artists in the world", the Tee Corinne Award for Outstanding Cover Design recognizes one book chosen as the favorite after two rounds of popular voting. Voters are encouraged to consider not only the cover but also typography, layout of printed words and how visual elements are arranged.

Recent winners demonstrate the international reach of the Goldies. In 2023, all four winners of the Ann Bannon and Tee Corrine awards were from outside the United States – Emily Banting and Suzanne Moss from England, Jae from Germany and E.J. Noyes from New Zealand. Other international winners in 2023 included Jo Havens and Lianyu Tan (Australia), Arlene Pare (Canada), Rachel Sommers (England), J.J. Hale (Ireland) and G. Benson (Spain).

A restricted grant from the Aronson-Besthoff Fund of the Greater New Orleans Foundation rendered Goldie winners eligible for prize money. In 2023, Ann Bannon winners received $3,000 for first place (gold), $2,000 for second place (silver) and $1,000 for third place (bronze). In 2024, Ann Bannon prizes were $15,000, $10,000 and $5,000.

=== Ann Bannon Popular Choice Award ===
Ann Bannon Popular Choice Award winners
Year	Title	Author	Publisher	Result	Ref.
2007	Snow Moon Rising	Lori L. Lake	Launch Point Press	Winner	
2008	And Playing The Role of Herself	K. E. Lane	Regal Crest Enterprises	Winner	
2009	The Kiss That Counted	Karin Kallmaker	Bella Books	Winner	
2010	Beggar of Love	Lee Lynch	Bold Strokes Books	Winner	
2011	Starting From Scratch	Georgia Beers	Brisk Press	Winner	
2012	Bingo Barge Murder, A Shay O'Hanlon Caper	Jessie Chandler	Midnight Ink	Winner	
2013	Survived by Her Longtime Companion	Chris Paynter	Blue Feather Books	Winner	
2014	All That Lies Within	Lynn Ames	Phoenix Rising Press	Winner	
2014	Letters Never Sent	Sandra Moran	Bedazzled Ink Publishing	Winner	
2015	Olive Oil & White Bread	Georgia Beers	Bywater Books	Winner	
2016	All We Lack	Sandra Moran	Bedazzled Ink Publishing	Winner	
2017	Rainbow Gap	Lee Lynch	Bold Strokes Books	Winner	
2018	An Outsider Inside	RJ Samuel	Self-published	Winner	
2019	A Proper Cuppa Tea	KG MacGregor	Bella Books	Winner	
2020	Judge Me When I'm Wrong	Cheryl A. Head	Bywater Books	Winner	
2021	Wrong Number, Right Woman	Jae	Ylva Publishing	Winner	
2022	The Headmistress	Milena McKay	Self-published	Winner	
2023	If I Don’t Ask	E. J. Noyes	Bella Books	Gold	
2023	Just a Touch Away	Jae	Ylva Publishing	Silver	
2023	Broken Beyond Repair	Emily Banting	Sapphfic Publishing	Bronze	
2024	Chaos Agent	Lee Winter	Ylva Publishing	Gold	
2024	Meeting Millie	Clare Ashton	Self-published	Silver	
2024	On the Same Page	Haley Cass	Self-published	Bronze	
2025	The Unfinished Line	Jen Lyon	Self-published	Gold	
2025	Vengeance Planning for Amateurs	Lee Winter	Ylva Publishing	Silver	
2025	Bachelorette Number Twelve	Jae	Ylva Publishing	Bronze	
2026	The Colonel's Daughter	Jen Lyon	Self-published	Gold	
2026	Number Six	Lee Winter	Ylva Publishing	Silver	
2026	Discovering Nicola	Clare Ashton	Self-published	Bronze	

=== Tee Corinne Award for Outstanding Cover Design ===
- 2026 – The Falcon and the Flame, cover design by Felix Tindall (Thirteen Books)
- 2025 – The Piano in the Tree, cover design by Korin Hunjak (Self-Published)
- 2024 – Along the Mystic River, cover design by Lisa Gold (Lisa Gold Books)
- 2023 – Observations on the Danger of Female Curiosity, cover design by Suzanne Moss (Aesculus Books)
- 2022 –The Headmistress, cover design by Em Schreiber (Self-Published)
- 2021 – Nottingham: The True Story of Robyn Hood, cover design by Ann McMan, TreeHouse Studio (Bywater Books)
- 2020 – Alone, cover design by Judith Fellows (Bella Books)
- 2019 – 2°, cover design by Ann McMan (Bywater Books)
- 2018 – An Outsider Inside, cover design by Ann McMan, TreeHouse Studio (Bywater Books)
- 2017 – Heartscapes, cover design by Sheri (Bold Strokes Books)
- 2016 – TIE: All We Lack, cover design by Ann McMan, TreeHouse Studio (Bedazzled Ink Publishing); Cast Me Gently, cover design by Glendon Haddix (Ylva Publishing)
- 2015 – Everything, cover design by Ann McMan, TreeHouse Studio (Bedazzled Ink Publishing)

=== Judged category winners and cash awards: 2026 ===
In 2024, prizes of $1,000 went to top-scoring books in 12 genre-specific novel categories, three non-novel categories, Audiobook Narrator, and Debut Novel.

Volunteer judges evaluated books on a 1-to10-point quantitative scale, rating each on criteria set out in a comprehensive evaluation form. Criteria for novels, for example, included opening, premise, plot, characters, writing, setting, and reader impact. Judges' scores were tallied, and finalists, winners and top-scoring books determined.

Judged category winners in 2026 are listed below, with monetary prize winners shown in bold:

Judged Award Category	Title	Recipient	Publisher
**Audiobook Narrator**	Architecti	Allie Rose; Aria Holland; Vivienne LaRue	Audible Studios
**Audiobook Narrator**	Beyond Her Manner	Angela Dawe	Sapphfic Publishing
**Audiobook Narrator**	**Bloom Town: Genesis**	**Quinn Riley**	**Podium Entertainment**
**Audiobook Narrator**	Forget Me Not	Lori Prince	Podium
**Audiobook Narrator**	Make or Break	Abby Craden	Audible Studios
**Audiobook Narrator**	Pyg	Marisa Calin	Self-Published
Contemporary Romance: **Long Novels**	**Discovering Nicola**	**Clare Ashton**	**Self-Published**
Contemporary Romance: **Long Novels**	Learning Curves	Rachel Lacey	Montlake
Contemporary Romance: **Long Novels**	No Such Thing as Serendipity	Rita Potter	Up A Tree Media, LLC
Contemporary Romance: **Long Novels**	Relationship Material	Rachel Spangler	Bigger Table Books
Contemporary Romance: **Long Novels**	Sweet Home Alabarden Park	TJ O'Shea	Bella Books
Contemporary Romance: **Mid-Length Novels**	After All	Bryce Oakley	Self-Published
Contemporary Romance: **Mid-Length Novels**	Hedonism	Lise Gold & Madeleine Taylor	Lise Gold Books
Contemporary Romance: **Mid-Length Novels**	The Princess Match	Clare Lydon	Custard Books
Contemporary Romance: **Mid-Length Novels**	**Sweet Talk**	**Rena Sapon-White and Ella Schaefer**	**Smokeshow Press**
Contemporary Romance: **Short Novels**	A Thousand Reasons	Titania Tempest	Self published
Contemporary Romance: **Short Novels**	Lyon's Den	Gerri Hill	Bella Books
Contemporary Romance: **Short Novels**	Pillow Talk	Justice Woods	Bella Books
Contemporary Romance: **Short Novels**	**Striking Gold**	**Tiana Warner**	**Ylva Publishing**
**Debut Novels**	Give My Love to Berlin	Katherine Bryant	Amphorae Publishing
**Debut Novels**	Her Shadow so Dark and Lovely	Elsie Hawthorne	Self-Published
**Debut Novels**	**The Maiden and Her Monster**	**Maddie Martinez**	**Tor Publishing Group**
**Debut Novels**	Pearl Bound	Natalie G. Bergman	Rose & Pearl Productions
**Debut Novels**	Shifting Gears	Jazz Forrester	Ylva Publishing
**Erotic Novels**	**One Weekend in Tahoe**	**Jaime Clevenger**	**Bella Books**
**Fantasy Novels**	The Lighthouse at the Edge of the World	J.R. Dawson	Tor Publishing Group
**Fantasy Novels**	**The Maiden and Her Monster**	**Maddie Martinez**	**Tor Publishing Group**
**Fantasy Novels**	Ship of Dreams	Brey Willows	Butterworth Books
**Fiction Anthologies / Collections**	**Frosting on the Cake 3: Still Crazy After All These Years**	**Karin Kallmaker**	**Bella Books**
**General Fiction**	Like Frail Boats on the Sea	Caren J. Werlinger	Corgyn Publishing
**General Fiction**	**milktooth**	**Jaime Burnet**	**Vagrant Press**
**Historical Fiction**	**Give My Love to Berlin**	**Katherine Bryant**	**Amphorae Publishing**
**Historical Fiction**	Payback	Penny Mickelbury	Bywater Books
**Mystery / Thriller / Crime Novels**	Blood of the Innocents	Catherine Maiorisi	Bella Books
**Mystery / Thriller / Crime Novels**	The Sleeper Car	Frances Lucas	River Mountain Publishing, LLC
**Mystery / Thriller / Crime Novels**	**The Stolen Girl**	**Cari Hunter**	**Bold Strokes Books**
**Paranormal / Occult / Horror Novels**	**Innocence of the Maiden**	**Ileandra Young**	**Bold Strokes Books**
**Paranormal / Occult / Horror Novels**	Shifting Nature	Jae	Ylva Publishing
**Poetry Poems / Collections**	**Cactus Flowers**	**Judite Teixeira** **translated by Samantha Pious**	**Headmistress Press**
**Romantic Blend Novels**	Breaking from Frame	Jazz Forrester	Ylva Publishing
**Romantic Blend Novels**	The Falcon and the Flame	Jolie Dvorak	Thirteen Books
**Romantic Blend Novels**	**Number Six**	**Lee Winter**	**Ylva Publishing**
**Romantic Blend Novels**	Windburn	Milena McKay	self-published
**Science Fiction Novels**	**Reclamation**	**Kristen Zimmer**	**Bywater Books**
**Young Adult / New Adult Fiction**	**A Thousand Tiny Promises**	**Morgan Lee Miller**	**Bold Strokes Books**
