= Radclyffe =

American author

Len Barot
- Born: 1950 (age 75–76)
- Occupation: Writer Publisher Editor
- Writing career
- Pen name: Radclyffe, L.L. Raand
- Genres: Lesbian contemporary romance and erotica, sapphic paranormal romance
- Website: boldstrokesbooks.com

Radclyffe (real name Dr. Lenora Ruth Barot, born 1950) is an American author of lesbian romance, paranormal romance, erotica, and mystery. She has authored multiple short stories, written fan fiction, and edited numerous anthologies. Radclyffe is a member of the Saints and Sinners Literary Hall of Fame and a founder of the Golden Crown Literary Society. She has won numerous literary awards, including the RWA/GDRWA Booksellers' Best award, the RWA/Orange County Book Buyers Best award, the RWA/New England Bean Pot award, the RWA/VCRW Laurel Wreath award, the RWA/FTHRW Lories award, the RWA/HODRW Aspen Gold award, the RWA Prism award, the Golden Crown Literary Award, and the Lambda Literary Award. She is a 2003/04 recipient of the Alice B Readers Award for her body of work. In 2014, the Lambda Literary Foundation awarded Barot with the Dr. James Duggins Outstanding Mid-Career Novelist award acknowledging her as an established author with a strong following and the promise of future high-quality work. In 2015 she was a featured author in the award-winning documentary film about the romance writing and reading community, Love Between the Covers, from Blueberry Hill Productions. In 2019 she was named a Trailblazer in Romance by the Romance Writers of America, for her works of LGBTQ+ fiction. In 2021, she was named one of The Advocate's Women of the Year, and in 2022, she was named to the Out100. In April 2025, Radclyffe was named to the 2025 Curve Power List, which "celebrates LGBTQ+ women and nonbinary individuals making seismic shifts in North America-shaping culture, policy, and social change."

Barot founded the independent LGBTQ+ publishing company Bold Strokes Books in 2004, whose mission is to publish quality works of LGBTQ+ fiction and to create visibility and opportunities for own-voices authors. She has given many workshops on the craft of writing, both face-to-face and online, to authors at all stages of development.

She lives with her wife, Rensselaer Polytechnic Institute professor Dr. Lee Ligon, in Johnsonville, New York.

She is a double-boarded General/Plastic and Reconstructive surgeon who retired from medicine in 2004 to devote herself full-time to writing and publishing. Barot chooses not to type, instead using speech recognition software to write her books.

== Early life and education ==
Barot was valedictorian of the June 1968 graduating class of Hudson Falls High School in Hudson Falls, New York, after which she attended the State University of New York at Albany.

Barot graduated from the University of Pennsylvania School of Medicine in 1976.

== Literary awards and honors ==
Year	Work	Award	Result	Ref.
2024	Fire in the Sky	Golden Crown Literary Award for Contemporary Romance (with Julie Cannon)	Winner	
2022	Unrivaled	Golden Crown Literary Award finalist	Finalist	
2020	Cost of Honor	RWA/GDRWA Booksellers' Best Award	Winner	
2018	Secret Hearts	RWA/Orange County Book Buyers Best Award	1st place	
2017	The Color of Love	Golden Crown Literary Award for Traditional Contemporary Romance	Winner	
2017	Heart Stop	Foreword Reviews' INDIES for Romance	Finalist	
2017	Heart Stop	Foreword Reviews' INDIES for LGBT Fiction	Finalist	
2016	Price of Honor	RWA/Orange County Book Buyers Best for Suspense & Mystery with Romantic Elements	1st place	
2014		Dr. James Duggins Outstanding Mid-Career Novelist Prize	Winner	
2014	Against Doctor's Orders	Foreword Reviews' INDIES for Romance	Finalist	
2014	Best Lesbian Romance	Golden Crown Literary Award for Anthology/Collections	Winner	
2014	Code of Honor	Golden Crown Literary Award for Romantic Suspense/Intrigue/Adventure	Winner	
2014	Homestead	Golden Crown Literary Award for Traditional Contemporary Romance	Winner	
2014	Myth and Magic	Foreword Reviews' INDIES for LGBT Fiction	Finalist	
2013	Homestead	Foreword Reviews' INDIES for Romance	Finalist	
2013	OMG Queer	Over the Rainbow List for Middle/Early Young Adult Nonfiction	Selection	
2013	OMG Queer	Golden Crown Literary Award for Anthology/Collections	Winner	
2013	Women of the Dark Streets	Golden Crown Literary Award for Anthology/Collections	Winner	
2012	Blood Hunt	Volusia County Romance Writers' Laurel Wreath Award	Winner	
2012	Crossroads	Foreword Reviews' INDIES for Romance	Winner (bronze)	
2012	OMG Queer	Foreword Reviews' INDIES for Gay & Lesbian	Finalist	
2011	Best Lesbian Romance	Lambda Literary Award for Anthology	Finalist	
2011	Firestorm	Foreword Reviews' INDIES for Romance	Winner (silver)	
2011	Trauma Alert	IPPY Award for Romance	Winner (silver)	
2010	In Deep Waters 2: Cruising the Strip	Lambda Literary Award for Lesbian Erotica	Winner	
2010	Trauma Alert	Foreword Reviews' INDIES for Romance	Finalist	
2009		Saints and Sinners Literary Hall of Fame		
2009	Deep Waters 2: Cruising the Strip	Lambda Literary Award for Lesbian Erotica	Winner	
2009	Justice for All	Foreword Reviews' INDIES for Mystery	Finalist	
2009	The Lonely Hearts Club	Lambda Literary Award for Lesbian Romance	Finalist	
2009	Romantic Interludes 2: Secrets	Foreword Reviews' INDIES for Short Story	Finalist	
2008	Erotic Interludes 5: Road Games	Golden Crown Literary Award for Lesbian Erotica	Winner	
2008	In Deep Waters: Cruising The Seas	Golden Crown Literary Award for Lesbian Erotica	Winner	
2008	Night Call	Foreword Reviews' INDIES for Gay & Lesbian	Winner	
2008	When Dreams Tremble	Lambda Literary Award for Lesbian Romance	Finalist	
2007	Erotic Interludes 4: Extreme Passions	Golden Crown Literary Award for Lesbian Erotica	Winner	
2007	Promising Hearts	Golden Crown Literary Award for Traditional Contemporary Romance	Winner	
2007	Turn Back Time	Lambda Literary Award for Lesbian Romance	Finalist	
2006	Distant Shores, Silent Thunder	Lambda Literary Award for Romance	Winner	
2006	Justice Served	Golden Crown Literary Award for Mystery / Action / Adventure / Thriller	Winner	
2006	Justice Served	Lambda Literary Award for Lesbian Mystery	Finalist	
2006	Stolen Moments: Erotic Interludes 2	Lambda Literary Award for Lesbian Erotica	Winner	
2005	Fated Love	Golden Crown Literary Award for Traditional Contemporary Romance	Winner	
2005	Justice in the Shadows	Golden Crown Literary Society Award for Mystery / Action / Adventure / Thriller	Winner	
2004		Alice B Readers Award	Winner	

== Works ==
The Provincetown Tales

- Safe Harbor
- Beyond the Breakwater
- Distant Shores, Silent Thunder
- Storms of Change
- Winds of Fortune
- Returning Tides
- Sheltering Dunes
- Treacherous Seas

Honor Series

- Above All, Honor
- Honor Bound
- Love & Honor
- Honor Guards
- Honor Reclaimed
- Honor Under Siege
- Word of Honor
- Oath of Honor (crossover with First Responders Novels)
- Code of Honor
- Price of Honor
- Cost of Honor

Justice Series

- A Matter of Trust (prequel)
- Shield of Justice
- In Pursuit of Justice
- Justice in the Shadows
- Justice Served
- Justice for All

PMC Hospital Romances

- Passion’s Bright Fury (prequel)
- Fated Love
- Night Call
- Crossroads
- Passionate Rivals
- Unrivaled
- Perfect Rivalry

First Responders Novels

- Trauma Alert
- Firestorm
- Taking Fire
- Wild Shores
- Heart Stop
- Dangerous Waters

Rivers Community Romances

- Against Doctor’s Orders
- Prescription for Love
- Love on Call
- Love After Hours
- Love to the Rescue
- Love on the Night Shift
- Pathway to Love
- Finders Keepers

Red Sky Ranch Romances (with Julie Cannon)

- Fire in the Sky
- Wild Fire

Romances

- Innocent Hearts
- Promising Hearts
- Love’s Melody Lost
- Love’s Tender Warriors
- Tomorrow’s Promise
- Love’s Masquerade
- shadowland
- Turn Back Time
- When Dreams Tremble
- The Lonely Hearts Club
- Secrets in the Stone
- Desire by Starlight
- Homestead
- The Color of Love
- Secret Hearts
- Only This Summer
- Fearless Hearts (forthcoming 2025)
- When Love Comes Around (with Ronica Black; forthcoming 2025)

Short Fiction

- Collected Stories by Radclyffe
  - Erotic Interludes: Change Of Pace
  - Radical Encounters
- Stacia Seaman and Radclyffe, eds.:
  - Erotic Interludes Vol. 2–5
  - Romantic Interludes Vol. 1–2
  - Breathless: Tales of Celebration
  - Women of the Dark Streets
  - Amor and More: Love Everafter
  - Myth & Magic: Queer Fairy Tales

Midnight Hunters Series (Writing as L.L. Raand)

- The Midnight Hunt
- Blood Hunt
- Night Hunt
- The Lone Hunt
- The Magic Hunt
- Shadow Hunt
- Rogue Hunt
- Enchanted Hunt
- Primal Hunt

Edited Anthologies

- Best Lesbian Romance 2009
- Best Lesbian Romance 2010
- Best Lesbian Romance 2011
- Best Lesbian Romance 2012
- Best Lesbian Romance 2013
- Best Lesbian Romance 2014
- Best Lesbian Romance of the Year, Vol 1 (2015)
- In Deep Waters 1: Cruising the Seas
- In Deep Waters 2: Cruising the Strip
- OMG Queer

== Video ==
Radclyffe is featured in the documentary Love Between the Covers, "An entertaining and inspiring look into the billion-dollar romance fiction industry and its powerhouse of female writers and readers, a sisterhood that’s pioneering the digital revolution while finding fortune, fulfillment, and a global community."
