= Bold Strokes Books =

American publishing company

- Founded: 2004
- Founder: Len Barot
- Country of origin: United States
- Headquarters location: Cambridge, New York
- Publication types: Books
- Fiction genres: LGBTQ fiction
- Official website: www.boldstrokesbooks.com

Bold Strokes Books is a midsized independent publisher headquartered in Cambridge, New York that offers a diverse collection of lesbian, gay, bisexual, transgender, and queer general and genre fiction. Their list includes romance, mystery/intrigue, crime, erotica, speculative fiction (sci-fi/fantasy/horror), general fiction, and young adult fiction. The company was founded in July 2004 by Len Barot.

As of 2018, Bold Strokes Books has published over 1,000 works by more than 200 authors, in paperback, ebook, and audiobook formats. Among its most notable titles are In Too Deep by Ronica Black (2005), Mistress of the Runes by Andrews & Austin (2007), Lady Knight by L-J Baker (2007), Blind Curves by Jacob and Diane Anderson-Minshall (2007) and Light by Nathan Burgoine (2013).

In 2007, Bold Strokes Books became the first LGBTQ publisher to be formally recognized by Romance Writers of America.

The company was also a sponsor of the annual Lesbian Book Festival in Palm Springs, California.
