= Lesbian literature =

Subgenre of literature with lesbian themes

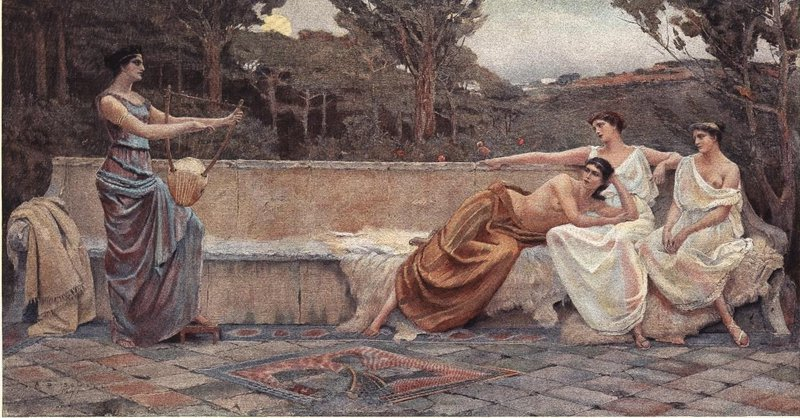
Sappho by Amanda Brewster Sewell, 1891. Sappho of Lesbos gave the term lesbian the connotation of erotic desire between women.

Lesbian literature is a subgenre of literature addressing lesbian themes. It includes poetry, plays, and fiction addressing lesbian characters, non-fiction about lesbian-interest topics, and works by lesbian writers. A similar term is sapphic literature, encompassing works that feature love between women that are not necessarily lesbian. Lesbian and sapphic literature are types of LGBTQ literature.

Fiction that falls into this category may be of any genre, such as historical fiction, science fiction, fantasy, horror, and romance.

== Overview ==
Lesbian literature includes works by lesbian authors, as well as lesbian-themed works by heterosexual authors. Even works by lesbian writers that do not deal with lesbian themes are still often considered lesbian literature. Works by heterosexual writers which treat lesbian themes only in passing, on the other hand, are not often regarded as lesbian literature.

The first surviving work of lesbian literature is the poetry of Sappho of Lesbos. Not much of Sappho's poetry remains, but that which does demonstrates the topics she wrote about: women's daily lives, their relationships, and rituals. She focused on the beauty of women and proclaimed her love for girls.

Certain works have established historical or artistic importance, and the world of lesbian fiction continues to grow and change as time goes on. Until recently, contemporary lesbian literature has been centered around several small, exclusively lesbian presses, as well as online fandoms. However, since the new millennium began, many lesbian presses have branched out to include the works of trans men and women, gay and bisexual voices, and other queer works not represented by the mainstream press. Additionally, novels with lesbian themes and characters have become more accepted in mainstream publishing.

== Early literature ==
=== Medieval Christian mysticism ===
The European Middle Ages lacked a specific term for lesbians, but medieval French texts, under the influence of the Arabic literature of the period, featured literary depictions of love and sexual desire between women. Such expressions are found in devotional texts to the Virgin Mary or the hagiography of Ida Louvain, by Beguines, or the writings of female Christian mystics, including Hildegard of Bingen, Hadewijch, Margery Kempe, Mechtild of Magdeburg, and Marguerite Porete.

=== 13th century Japan ===
One of the oldest Japanese stories involving a romance and implied sexual relations between women appears in the 6th volume of Waga mi ni tadoru himegimi (Japanese: わが身にたどる姫君) (The Princess in Search of Herself) which was created between 1259 and 1278 (author unknown).

=== 16th-18th century Europe ===
Renaissance-era translations of Greek and Roman texts uncovered their references to desire and sexual practices between women. Terry Castle credits these translations as the trigger for increased lesbian themes in European literature. Influences included fragments of poetry by Sappho, Ovid's Metamorphoses and Heroides, Martial's Epigrams, and Juvenal's Satires. In particular, Sappho's legend and poetry sparked numerous adaptations over the next centuries in Italy, France, England, and Germany. However, many commenters denied the homoerotic content of the original works.^{:12-15}

During the 17th and 18th centuries, many British women published works with queer or homoerotic themes and varying degrees of explicitness. One school of British women wrote poetry for other women inspired by earlier themes of "romantic" friendship. These writers included Katherine Philips, Anne Killigrew, Anne Finch, and Anna Seward.^{:2,48}

=== 19th century: forerunners ===
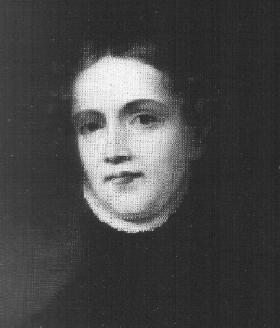
Diarist Anne Lister

In the early 19th century, Chinese poet Wu Tsao gained popularity for her lesbian love poems. Her songs, according to poet Kenneth Rexroth, were "sung all over China". In 1849, Leona Florentino was born in the Philippines during the brutal patriarchal Spanish colonial regime. Known as the mother of Philippine women's literature and a pioneer in Philippine lesbian literature, her poems, both written and oral, during her 35-year life brought about feminism in the archipelago which influenced many of the revolutionaries before the Philippine revolution.

Though lesbian literature had not yet evolved as a distinct genre in English in the 19th century, lesbian writers like the essayist and supernatural fiction writer Vernon Lee sometimes hinted at lesbian subtexts in their work or, like Lee's lover Amy Levy, wrote love poems to women using the voice of a heterosexual man. Others wrote, but kept their writing secret. Beginning in 1806, English landowner and mountaineer Anne Lister kept extensive diaries for 34 years, which included details of her lesbian relationships and seductions, with the lesbian sections written in secret code. The diaries were not published until the 1980s. In 2010, they were the basis for a BBC television production, The Secret Diaries of Miss Anne Lister.

Twenty-first century writer and editor Susan Koppelman compiled an anthology titled Two Friends and Other 19th-century American Lesbian Stories: by American Women Writers, which includes stories by Constance Fenimore Woolson, Octave Thanet, Mary Eleanor Wilkins Freeman, Kate Chopin and Sarah Orne Jewett that were originally published in periodicals of their time. Of these stories, which range "from the explicit to inferentially lesbian", Koppelman said, "I recognize these stories as stories about women loving women in the variety of romantic ways that we wouldn't even have to struggle to define if we were talking about men and women loving each other."

Since the 1970s, scholars of lesbian literature have analyzed as lesbian relationships that would not have been labeled as such in the 19th century due to different conceptions of intimacy and sexuality. For example, Christina Rossetti's 1862 poem "Goblin Market" has been widely read as a narrative of lesbianism, even though it attempts to paint itself as a narrative of sisterly love. Additionally, scholars have engaged in queer readings of the novels of Charlotte Brontë, particularly Shirley and Villette, in which the female main characters engage in close or even obsessive relationships with other women. Some have even speculated that Brontë herself may have been in love with her friend Ellen Nussey; Vita Sackville-West called the letters between the two "love letters pure and simple."

Scholars have similarly speculated on whether the 19th-century poet Emily Dickinson might have been in love with her sister-in-law, Susan Gilbert, a possibility that encourages queer readings of Dickinson's many love poems.

Michael Field was the pseudonym used by two British women, Katherine Bradley and Edith Cooper, who wrote poetry and verse-dramas together. Bradley was Cooper's aunt, and the two lived together as lovers from the 1870s to their deaths in 1913 and 1914. Their poetry often took their love as its subject, and they also wrote a book of poems for their dog, Whym Chow.

== Modern history ==
=== 1900–1950: Beginnings ===
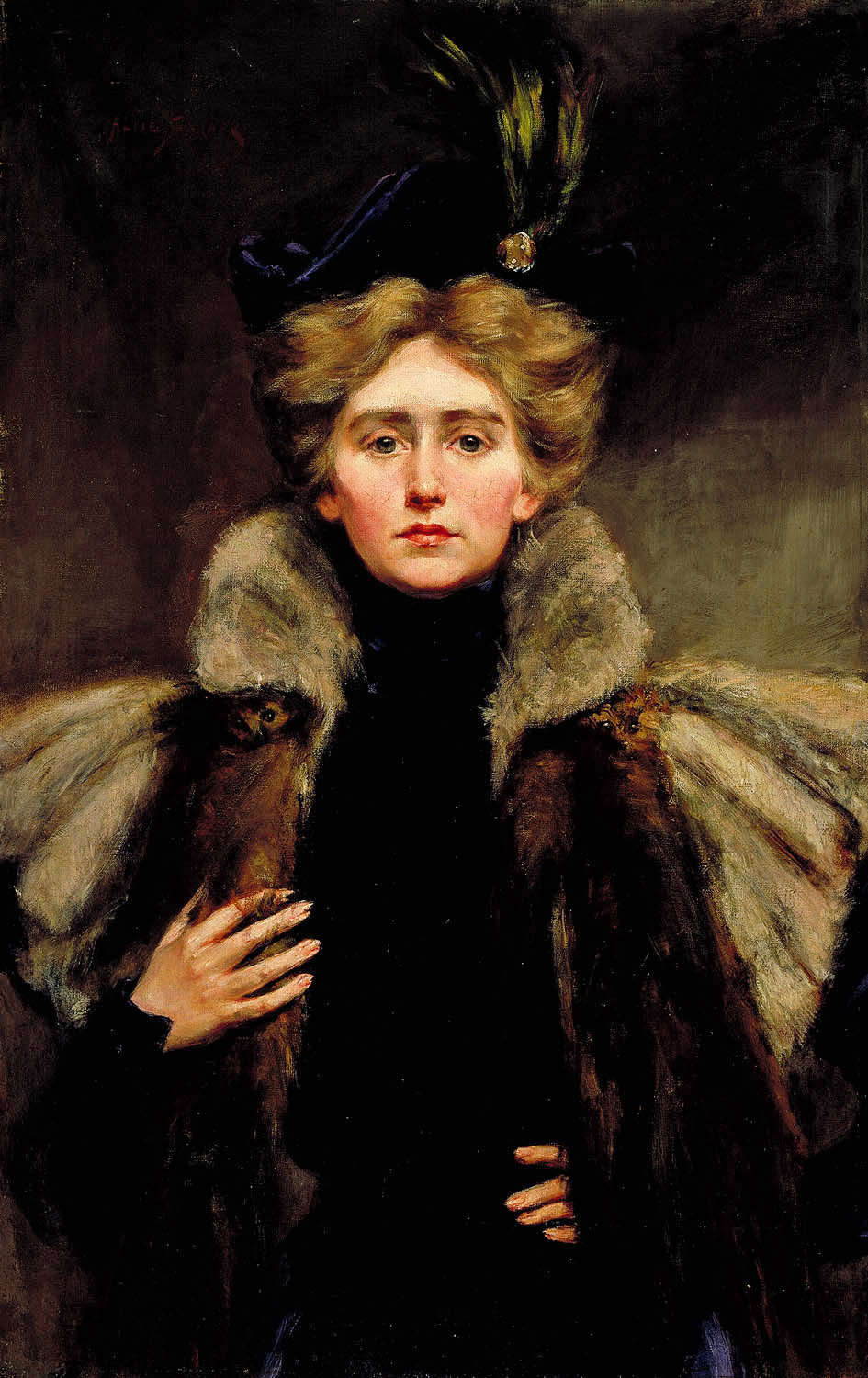
Natalie Barney hosted an early 20th century Parisian salon frequented by lesbian writers.

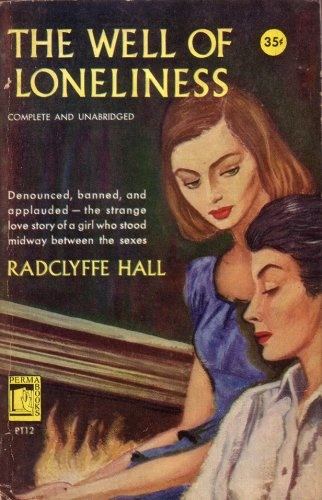
Radclyffe Hall's 1928 novel The Well of Loneliness faced censorship in the U.S. and Britain.

The first novel in the English language recognised as having a lesbian theme is The Well of Loneliness (1928) by Radclyffe Hall, which a British court found obscene because it defended "unnatural practices between women". The book was banned in Britain for decades; this is in the context of the similar censorship of Lady Chatterley's Lover, which also had a theme of transgressive female sexuality, albeit heterosexual. In the United States, The Well of Loneliness survived legal challenges in New York and the U.S. Customs Court.

Elsa Gidlow, who was born in England and grew up in Quebec, Canada, co-edited, published, and contributed literary work to the first known North American lesbian/gay-themed periodical, Les Mouches fantastiques, published in Montreal from 1918 to 1920. She later moved to the United States, where she continued her literary output by publishing, in 1923, the first volume of openly lesbian love poetry to be produced in that country, titled On a Grey Thread.

In the early 20th century, an increasingly visible lesbian community in Paris centered on literary salons hosted by French lesbians as well as expatriates like Nathalie Barney and Gertrude Stein, who produced lesbian-themed works in French and English, including Nightwood by Djuna Barnes, Idyll Saphique by Liane de Pougy, poetry by Renee Vivien, Barney's own epigrams, poetry, and several works by Stein. Radclyffe Hall also spent time in Paris at Barney's salon and modeled one of her characters in The Well of Loneliness after her.

In Spain, there was also a timid awakening of lesbian literature in the early 20th century. The first work to deal with the subject was Zezé (1909) by Ángeles Vicente. The only one who dared to publish homoerotic verses was Lucía Sánchez Saornil, although under the male pen name Luciano de San Saor. Other authors, such as Carmen de Burgos, made references to lesbianism in a more veiled manner.

In Japan, there were several love suicides involving school girls in 1911 and it was in this context of greater awareness of female-female love that one of the most commercially successful female writers of the period Nobuko Yoshiya published Flower Tales (1916–1924) (Japanese: 花物語) which were fifty-two stories of romantic friendship between young women within the Class S genre. In her later work “Two Virgins in the Attic” (1919) (Japanese: 屋根裏の二處女), she describes a female-female love experience, which ended with their decision to live together as a couple. Tamura Toshiko published works with same-sex love between women: Resignation (1911) (Japanese: あきらめ) and The Fresh Heart (1916) (Japanese: 若い心).

Virginia Woolf's 1928 novel of a high-spirited gender-bending poet who lives for centuries, Orlando, which was said to be based on her lover, Vita Sackville-West, was re-examined in the 1970s as a 'subversive' lesbian text.

A key piece of modern Greek lesbian literature was Her Lover, published in 1929 in Alexandria, Egypt. It was written by the Alexandrian Greek author Dora Rosetti and published without her permission by two male friends of hers when she was eighteen. The book elicited a large scandal in Greece, resulting in the destruction of almost all of its copies. The publication contained photos and details about Rosetti and her partner, outing them publicly. This caused Rosetti to not release any more of her writing until one of her readers, Eleni Bakopoulou, sought her out in 1984. Rosetti agreed to let Bakopoulou study her writing for posthumous publication.

During the Weimar Republic, not only did lesbian social life flourish in Germany, especially in Berlin, but lesbian literature also emerged. Pioneering magazines such as Die Freundin, Die BIF, and Frauenliebe, which were founded specifically for a lesbian audience, supported lesbian literature focused on middle-class experiences. Some, like Die Freundin, regularly published trans authors, although other magazines specifically focused on trans literature. During this era there were over 25 queer publications produced in Berlin, with over six targeting lesbian readers. Although the literary level was rarely high, the authors succeeded in presenting lesbian lifestyles as utopias, thus offering opportunities for identification and affirmation of one's own identity. Especially Selli Engler stands out among the dozens of authors who wrote for magazines.

Separately, writers as Maximiliane Ackers, Ruth Margarete Roellig and Anna Elisabet Weirauch, whose lesbian trilogy Der Skorpion (The Scorpion) was even translated into English, achieved some fame as lesbian voices.

Other examples of 1920s lesbian literature include poems by Amy Lowell about her partner of over a decade Ada Dwyer Russell. Lowell wanted to dedicate her books to Dwyer who refused as they had to hide the nature of their relationship except for one time in a non-poetry book in which Lowell wrote, "To A.D.R., This, and all my books. A.L." Examples of these love poems to Dwyer include the Taxi, Absence, In a Garden, Madonna of the Evening Flowers, Opal, and Aubade. Lowell admitted to John Livingston Lowes that Dwyer was the subject of her series of romantic poems titled "Two Speak Together". Lowell's poems about Dwyer have been called the most explicit and elegant lesbian love poetry during the time between the ancient Sappho and poets of the 1970s. Unfortunately, most of the primary document romantic letters of communication between the two were destroyed by Dwyer at Lowell's request, leaving much unknown about the details of their life together.

Most American literature of the 1930s, 40s, and early 50s presented lesbian life as tragedy, ending with either the suicide of the lesbian character or her conversion to heterosexuality. This was required so that the authorities did not declare the literature obscene. This would generally be achieved by placing the death or conversion in the last chapter or even paragraph. For example, The Stone Wall, a lesbian autobiography with an unhappy ending, was published in 1930 under the pseudonym Mary Casal. It was one of the first lesbian autobiographies. Yet as early as 1939, Frances V. Rummell, an educator and a teacher of French at Stephens College, published the first explicitly lesbian autobiography in which two women end up happily together, titled Diana: A Strange Autobiography. This autobiography was published with a note saying, "The publishers wish it expressly understood that this is a true story, the first of its kind ever offered to the general reading public". However, literary critics have since called the autobiography 'fictional'.

Jane Bowles' only novel, Two Serious Ladies, published in 1943, told the story of a romance between an upper class woman and a prostitute in a run-down Panamanian port town.

=== 1950 to 1970: Pulp fiction and beyond ===
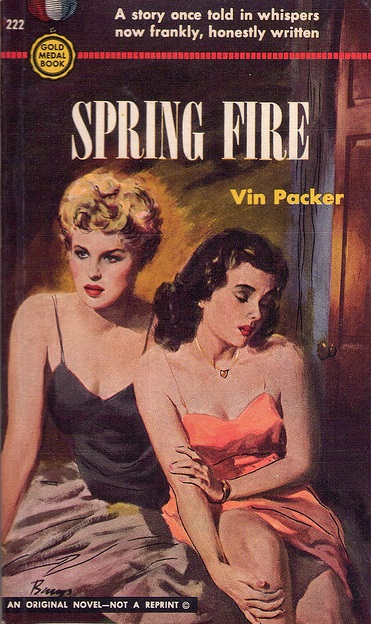
Lesbian pulp fiction, like Spring Fire by Vin Packer (Marijane Meaker 1952), was popular during the 1950s and 60s.

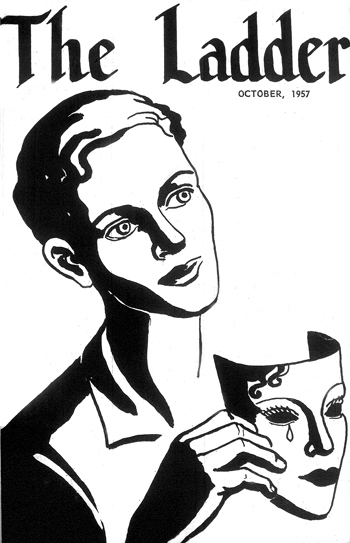
The Ladder magazine (1956–1972), founded by the Daughters of Bilitis, was the first national lesbian periodical published in the United States.

Lesbian fiction in English saw a huge explosion in interest with the advent of the dime-store or pulp fiction novel. Lesbian pulp fiction became its own distinct category of fiction in the 1950s and 60s, although a significant number of authors of this genre were men using either a male or female pen name. Many of these men did not intend to write for women, so they did not give their characters happy endings and their writing was often homophobic. Publishing and legal restrictions additionally limited the genre's representation. However, lesbian pulp fiction's popularity enabled many women to read books with some lesbian representation, and lesbian writers could eventually publish in the genre as well.

Tereska Torrès is credited with writing the first lesbian pulp novel, Women's Barracks, a fictionalized story about women in the Free French Forces during World War II. The 1950 book sold 2 million copies in its first five years of publication. Spring Fire, published in 1952 by Marijane Meaker under the pseudonym Vin Packer, sold 1.5 million copies. Meaker later stated she was embarrassed by the book's unhappy ending, which her publisher had prompted her to add. One notable female author of lesbian pulp fiction, who came out later in life as a lesbian, was Ann Bannon, who created the Beebo Brinker series.

The Price of Salt by Patricia Highsmith, considered the first lesbian novel with a happy ending, (Note: Marijane Meaker stated in her 2003 memoir: "[The Price of Salt ] was for many years the only lesbian novel, in either hard or soft cover, with a happy ending.") was groundbreaking for being the first where neither of the two women has a nervous breakdown, dies tragically, faces a lonely and desolate future, commits suicide, or returns to being with a male. The manuscript was rejected by Highsmith's publisher Harper & Brothers and published in hardcover by Coward-McCann in 1952 under the pseudonym "Claire Morgan", followed by the Bantam Books lesbian pulp fiction paperback in 1953. The paperback editions sold almost 1 million copies. In 1990, it was republished by Bloomsbury under Highmith's own name with the title changed to Carol (the novel was adapted as the 2015 film of same name).

In the 1950s, parts of French author Violette leDuc's novel Ravages were censored because they contained explicit lesbian passages. The deleted passages were published in the 1960s as Therese and Isabelle and made into the 1968 film of same title.

Jane Rule's Desert of the Heart was able to break out of the pulp fiction category when it was published as a hardback by Macmillan Canada in 1964. Several publishers turned it down beforehand however, with one telling Rule, "If this book isn't pornographic, what's the point of printing it?...if you can write in the dirty parts we'll take it but otherwise no". The novel was loosely adapted into the 1985 film Desert Hearts.

When publishing her novel Mrs. Stevens Hears the Mermaids Singing in 1965, the novelist May Sarton feared that writing openly about lesbianism would lead to a diminution of the previously established value of her work. "The fear of homosexuality is so great that it took courage to write Mrs. Stevens Hears the Mermaids Singing," she said, "to write a novel about a woman homosexual who is not a sex maniac, a drunkard, a drug-taker, or in any way repulsive, to portray a homosexual who is neither pitiable nor disgusting, without sentimentality ..."

The first English contemporary novelist to come out as a lesbian was Maureen Duffy, whose 1966 book Microcosm explored the subcultures of lesbian bars. Also in 1966, June Arnold's first novel Applesauce was published by McGraw Hill. It received mixed reviews due to its experimental style, and Arnold believed that critics misunderstood the feminist and lesbian themes. Applesauce received broader recognition when it was republished in 1977 by Daughters, Inc., an independent press Arnold cofounded to support the development of a uniquely lesbian feminist avant-garde aesthetic.

=== 1970 to the present: Second wave feminism, mainstream acceptance, and diversification ===
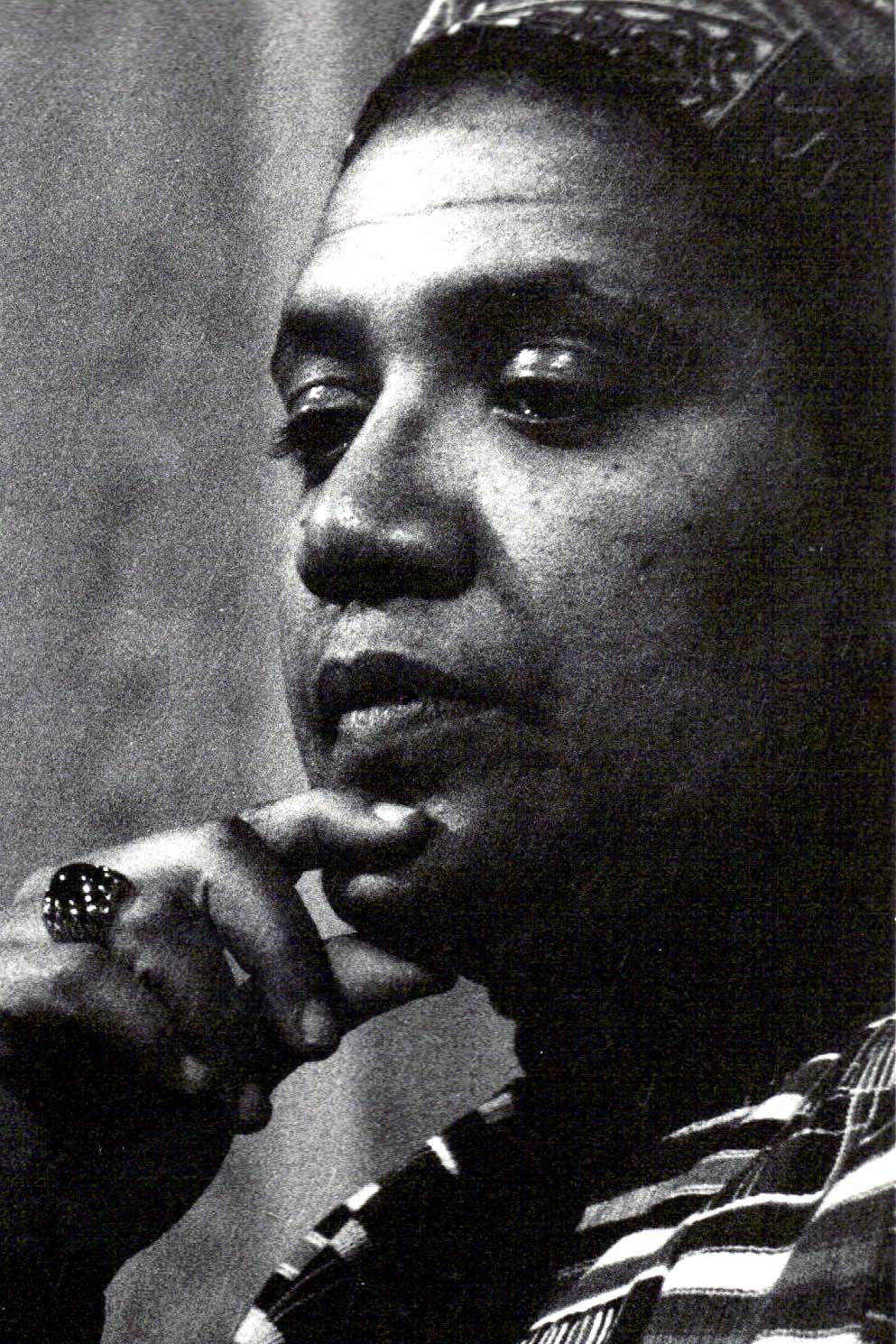
Lesbian feminist and womanist Audre Lorde wrote several books from the 1970s to the 1990s.

The feminist movement in the late 1960s and early 1970s saw the development of a more politicized voice in lesbian literature and more mainstream acceptance of lesbian-themed literature that moved away from the 'tragic lesbian' theme that had dominated earlier works. A pioneering autobiographical novel of this era was the picaresque 1973 novel Rubyfruit Jungle by Rita Mae Brown, which became a national best-seller. It was innovative for accepting and valuing its protagonist's lesbianism, departing from the tropes of prior lesbian literature rooted in The Well of Loneliness. Jill Johnston argued for lesbian separatism in her 1973 book Lesbian Nation. In the 1970s, the voices of American lesbians of color began to be heard, including works by Audre Lorde, Jewelle Gomez, Paula Gunn Allen, Cherrie Moraga, and Gloria Anzaldua. One of the foundational texts of black lesbian literature is Ann Allen Shockley’s novel, Loving Her. Published in 1974, Loving Her is widely considered to be one of the first, if not the first, published pieces of black lesbian literature. Joanna Russ's 1975 novel The Female Man contains an alternative universe inhabited solely by lesbians. The 1970s also saw the advent of feminist and LGBTQ publishing houses, such as Naiad Press, and literary magazines like Sinister Wisdom, Conditions, and Feminary, which published lesbian works. Adrienne Rich and Judy Grahn were important poets and essayists of the era. Patience and Sarah by Alma Routsong, published under the pen name "Isabel Miller" in 1971, examined the historical confines of a romance between two 19th-century women in a Boston Marriage.

There had existed a popularity within the science fiction and fantasy genres the idea of all-women utopias since the 19th century (such as “Herland” by Charlotte Perkins Gilman in 1915, or “Mizora” by Mary Bradley Lane in 1880), though they lacked sexual elements and possibilities of lesbian sexuality until the late 1960s, 70s, and 80s. It was then that more erotic and lesbian instances emerged in science fiction stories, alongside women being outside of, or at war with, the patriarchy and heteronormativity. An example of this growth in the women-utopia subgenre is French feminist writer Monique Wittig's “Les Guérillères,” published in 1969, which portrayed an experimental and erotic world where “women outside of the matrix of heterosexuality would have the potential to become something entirely different than women defined in relationship to men.”

After the birth of an explicitly gay and lesbian literature in the 1970s, the following decades saw a tremendous rise in its production. While gay male novels had more crossover appeal and often became mid-list sellers in mainstream publishing houses; lesbian literature, depending on smaller presses, developed smaller but 'respectable' audiences. In the 1980s, with the advent of sex-positive feminism, a few lesbian literary magazines began to specialize in more explicitly erotic work, such as On Our Backs, a satirical reference to the feminist 1970s magazine, Off Our Backs. The 1988 founding of the Lambda Literary Award, with several lesbian categories, helped increase the visibility of LGBT literature.

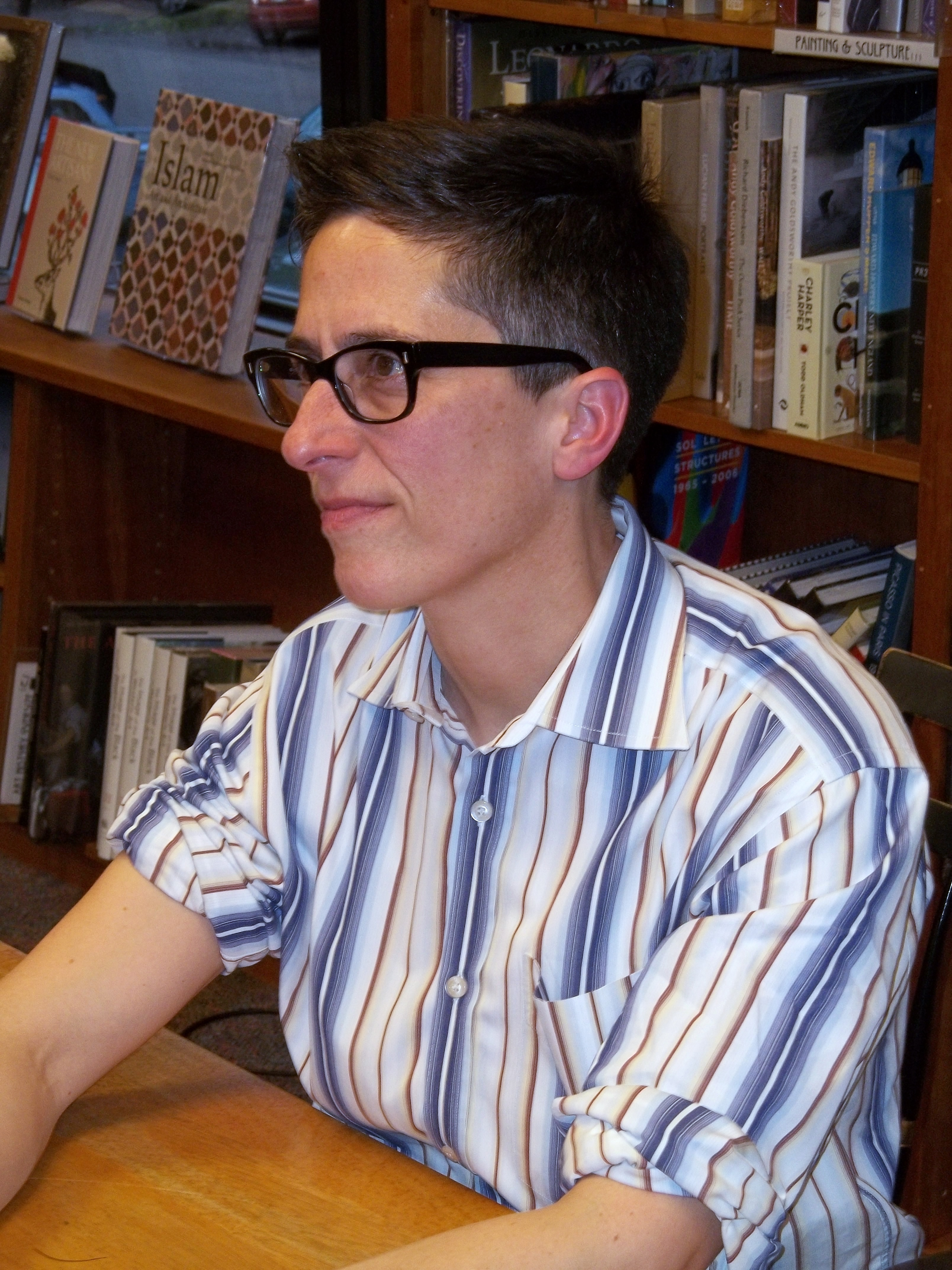
Alison Bechdel, who has been praised for her cartoons and graphic memoir, Fun Home, exemplifies the increasing diversification of lesbian literature in the 21st century.

In the 1980s and 90s, lesbian literature diversified into genre literature, including fantasy, mystery, science fiction, romance, graphic novels, and young adult. Influential genre-based books of the time included Trouble and her Friends by Melissa Scott, Gossamer Axe by Gael Baudino, Dancing Jack by Laurie Marks, and Speaking Dreams by Severna Park. A graphic novel is Blue Is the Warmest Color by Jul Maroh.

In 1983, Anita Cornwell wrote the first published collection of essays by an African-American lesbian, Black Lesbian in White America, published by Naiad Press.

The influence of late 20th-century feminism and greater acceptance of LGBT work was felt in Mexico, with the emergence of lesbian poets Nancy Cardenas, Magaly Alabau, Mercedes Roffe, and others. In Argentina and Uruguay, Alejandra Pizarnik and Cristina Peri Rossi combined lesbian eroticism with artistic and sociopolitical concerns in their work.

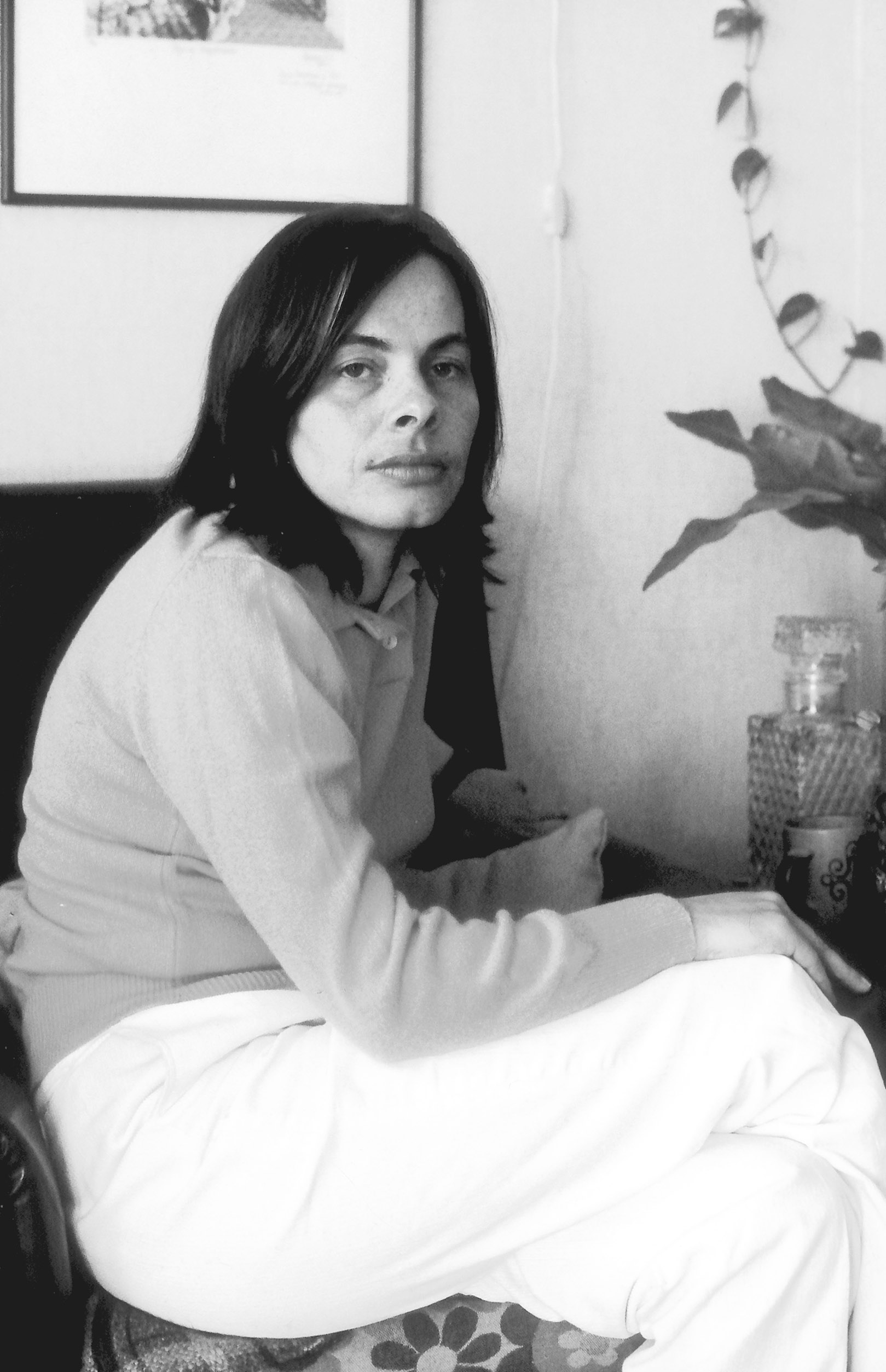
Uruguayan writer Cristina Peri Rossi has written about the eroticism of lesbian relationships.

After an almost complete silence in the 1960s, lesbian literature in Germany grew quickly again as a result of the new lesbian movement in the 1970s and 1980s. Important early renowned voices were Johanna Moosdorf, Marlene Stenten, and Christa Reinig, while the most influential works were Häutungen (1975) by Verena Stefan and Sonja (1980) by Luise F. Pusch.

In Asia, Singaporean playwright Eleanor Wong and Taiwanese writer Qiu Miaojin have written about lesbian relationships, as have Chinese writers Lin Bai and Chen Ran. Spinning Tropics by Aska Mochizuki. Real World by Natsuo Kirino explores lesbian love in Japan. Indian novelist Abha Dawesar's 2006 Babyji won a Stonewall Award and the Lambda Award.

In the 21st century, lesbian literature has emerged as a genre in Arabic speaking countries, with some novels, like Ana Hiya Anti (I Am You) by Elham Mansour, achieving best-seller status. This century has also brought more attention to African literary works and authors, such as Cameroonian novelist Frieda Ekotto and Ghanaian writer Ama Ata Aido.

Meanwhile, English-language novels which have continued to garner national awards and mainstream critical acclaim, like The Color Purple (1982) by Alice Walker, Bastard out of Carolina (1992) by Dorothy Allison, Fingersmith (2002) by Sarah Waters and Lost and Found (2006) by Carolyn Parkhurst.

As literature including lesbian characters and relationships has become more accepted in mainstream Western society, some writers and literary critics have questioned why there needs to be a separate category for lesbian literature at all. "I've never understood why straight fiction is supposed to be for everyone, but anything with a gay character or that includes gay experience is only for queers," said Jeanette Winterson, author of the best-selling 1985 novel Oranges Are Not the Only Fruit. Others have stressed the continuing need for LGBT-themed literature, especially for younger LGBT readers.

== Young adult fiction ==
=== 1970s ===
In Ruby (1976) by Rosa Guy, the main character is a girl from the West Indies. The novel tells the story of her relationship with another girl. Other young adult novels with lesbian characters and themes that were published during this time include Happy Endings Are All Alike (1978) by Sandra Scoppettone. According to the author, it "barely got reviewed and when it did it wasn't good", unlike Scoppettone's novel about gay boys, which was better received. In 1979, Lollipop Power published When Megan Went Away, a small-run stapled book that may have been the first U.S. children's book to feature a character with lesbian parents.

Frequent themes in books published during the 1970s are that homosexuality is a "phase", or that there are no "happy endings" for gay people, and that they generally lead a difficult life.

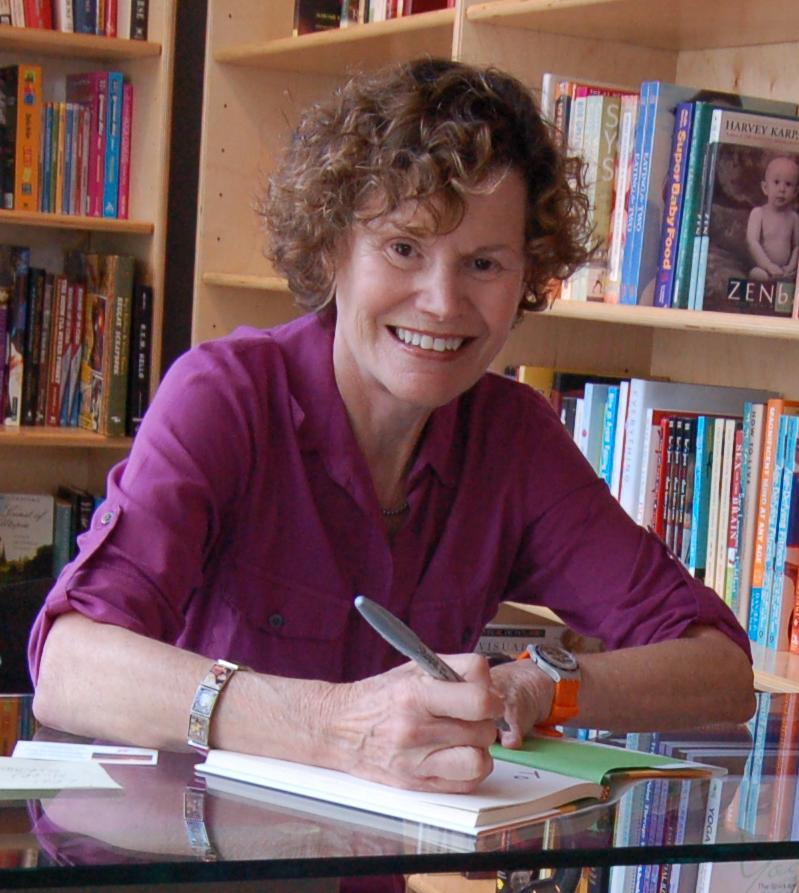
Judy Blume has been cited as a catalyst for the inclusion of 'taboo' subjects, including homosexuality, in children's and YA books.

The School Library Journal reported:

Throughout the 1970s, there was, on average, a single young adult title per year dealing with gay issues. Although many of these early books were well written—and well reviewed—gay characters were at best a sidekick or foil for the straight protagonist and at worst a victim who would face violence, injury, or death (fatal traffic accidents were commonplace). Young protagonists who worried that they might be gay would invariably conclude that their same-sex attraction was simply a temporary stage in the journey toward heterosexual adulthood.

Judy Blume has been cited as a catalyst in the 1970s for an increase in inclusion of "taboo" topics in children's literature, which include homosexuality.

=== 1980s ===
Annie on My Mind (1982) by Nancy Garden tells the story of two high school girls who fall in love. The novel, which has never been out of print, was a step forward for homosexuality in young adult literature. It was published in hardback and by a major press. In the book, homosexuality is seen as something permanent and to be explored, not "fixed." In Kansas, a minister led a public burning of Annie on My Mind following a controversy after it was donated to a school library.

Annie John (1985) by Jamaica Kincaid tells the story of a young girl coming of age in Antigua. The protagonist often finds herself falling in love with girls in her class, neighborhood, and general surroundings.

In 1989, Lesléa Newman published Heather Has Two Mommies, soon re-published by Alyson Publications to intense media attention, controversy, and book ban campaigns. It was a dense and didactic book, but gained popularity as an unprecedented children's book to focus on positive lesbian representation. Other children's books, like Three Days on a River in a Red Canoe, by Vera B. Williams, were popular among some lesbian families for their lesbian subtext and entertaining stories.

=== 1990s ===
During this decade the number of lesbian-themed young adult novels published rose. Nancy Garden published two novels with lesbian protagonists, Lark in the Morning (1991) and Good Moon Rising, and received positive sales and reviews. In 1994, M.E. Kerr published Deliver Us From Evie, about a boy with a lesbian sister, which was well received by the public. Other books published during this decade include Dive (1996) by Stacey Donovan, The Necessary Hunger (1997) by Nina Revoyr, The House You Pass On the Way (1997) by Jacqueline Woodson, Girl Walking Backwards (1998) by Bett Williams (who intended the novel for an adult audience though it was popular among teens), Hard Love (1999) by Ellen Wittlinger and Dare Truth or Promise (1999) by Paula Boock.

=== 2000s ===
The 1990s represented a turning point for young adult novels that explored lesbian issues, and since 2000, a flood of such books has reached the market. The public attitude towards lesbian themes in young adult literature has grown more accepting.

In the past, most books portrayed gay people as "living isolated lives, out of context with the reality of an amazingly active community." Today, books also show gay characters not as stigmatized and separate.

In 2000, the School Library Journal included Annie on My Mind in its list of the top 100 most influential books of the century.

Eileen Myles, a self-described "lesbian poet", published 'Cool for You' at the turn of the century. The novel explores a fictionalized version of Eileen's working-class childhood and young adulthood as a lesbian in Cambridge, Massachusetts. The novel deals with themes of sexuality, gender, class, family, death, and addiction.

A popular young adult novel of 2012, The Miseducation of Cameron Post by Emily M. Danforth, tells the story of a 12-year-old girl who is sent to a de-gaying camp in Montana. A film adaptation was made in 2018.

There are fewer books about female homosexuality than male homosexuality, and even fewer books on bisexuality are published. Despite the fact that availability of books with teen lesbian and bisexual themes has increased since the 1960s, books with non-white characters are still difficult to find. One exception is the 2021 young adult novel, Last Night at the Telegraph Club, which describes the coming-of-age of a teenage daughter of Chinese immigrants in 1950's San Francisco.

== Lesbian themes written by men ==
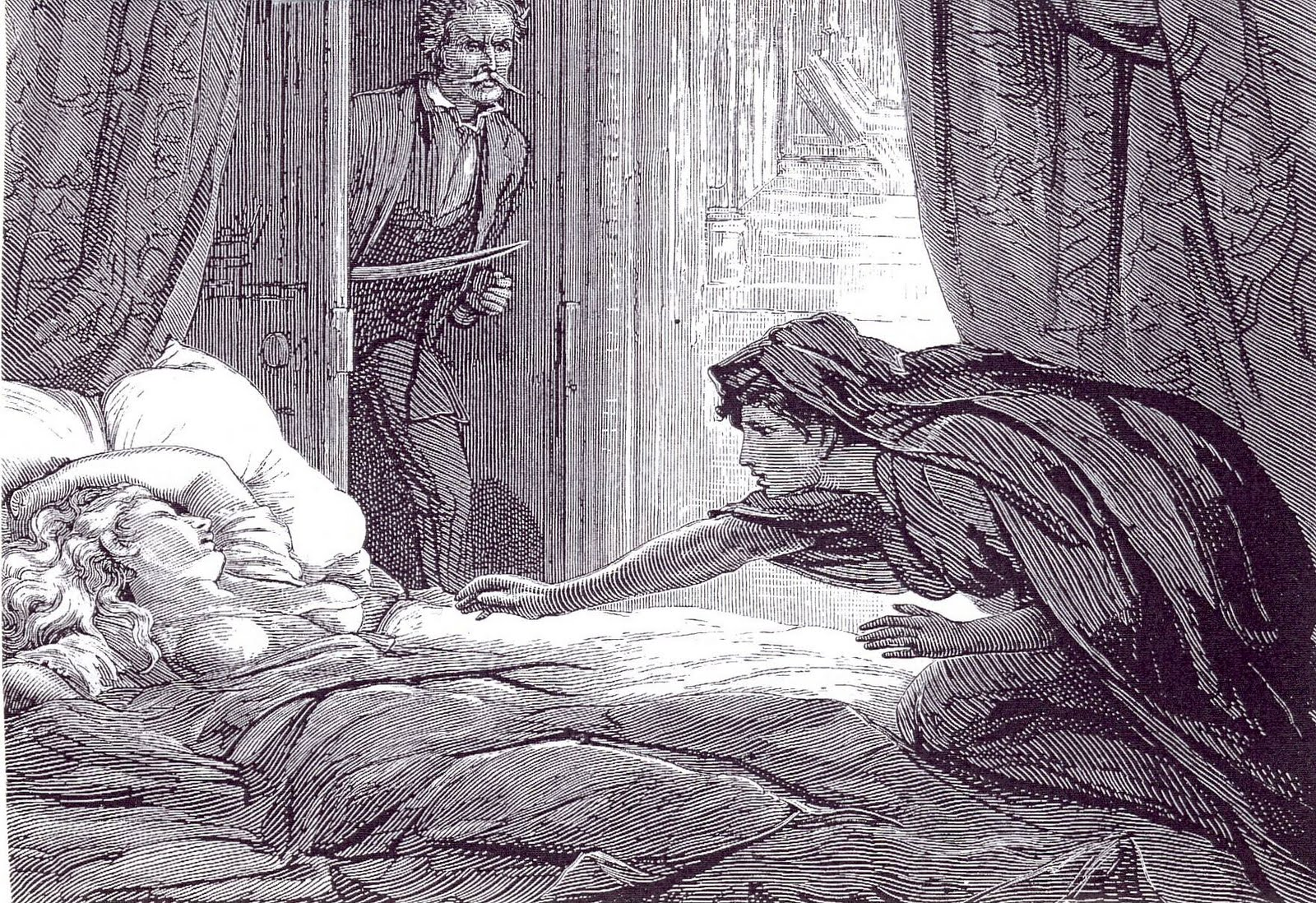
Illustration by D. H. Friston From the first publication of the lesbian vampire novella Carmilla (1872) by Sheridan Le Fanu

Certain canonical male authors of the 19th century incorporated lesbian themes into their work. At the beginning of the century, Samuel Taylor Coleridge published his unfinished narrative poem "Christabel". Scholars have interpreted the interactions in this poem between the titular character and a stranger named Geraldine as having lesbian implications. Algernon Charles Swinburne became known for subject matter that was considered scandalous, including lesbianism and sadomasochism. In 1866, he published Poems and Ballads, which contained the poems "Anactoria" and "Sapphics" concerning Sappho of Lesbos and dealing explicitly with lesbian content. Henry James portrayed a Boston marriage, considered an early form of lesbian relationship, between the feminist characters Olive Chancellor and Verena Tarrant in his 1886 novel The Bostonians.

Scholars have seen lesbian potential in characters such as Marian Halcombe in Wilkie Collins's 1859 novel The Woman in White. Marian is described as masculine and unattractive, and her motivation throughout the story is her love for her half-sister, Laura Fairlie.

One of the more explicitly lesbian works of the 19th century is the Gothic novella Carmilla, by Joseph Sheridan Le Fanu, first published in serial form in 1871-72. Considered a precursor to and an inspiration for Bram Stoker's Dracula, Carmilla tells the story of the relationship between the innocent Laura and the vampire Carmilla, whose sucking of Laura's blood is clearly linked to an erotic attraction to Laura. This story has inspired many other works that take advantage of the trope of the lesbian vampire. It was also adapted into a YouTube web series of the same name beginning in 2014.

In 1894, Belgian poet Pierre Louÿs published his Songs of Bilitis, a collection of prose poems with strong lesbian themes claimed to be written by a contemporary of Sappho. The collection was praised for its sensuality and refined style, as well as for the author's compassionate portrayal of lesbian sexuality. Some of the poems were later adapted by Claude Debussy, and proved an inspiration for the name of the 1950s lesbian rights organisation Daughters of Bilitis.

In Spain, the first theatrical work dealing with lesbianism, Un sueño de la razón by Cipriano Rivas Cherif, premiered in 1929.

In Japan, Jun'ichirō Tanizaki included a lesbian love affair in the novel 卍 Manji, written in serial format between 1928 and 1930 for the magazine Kaizō. A Japanese novel with a substantial lesbian component is Beauty and Sadness (1961–63) by Nobel laureate Yasunari Kawabata. The story is about a female painter, Otoko Ueno, and her relationship with her jealous lesbian lover, Keiko Sakami.

The Hours (1998), by American author Michael Cunningham, includes lesbian characters or relationships.

== Publishers ==
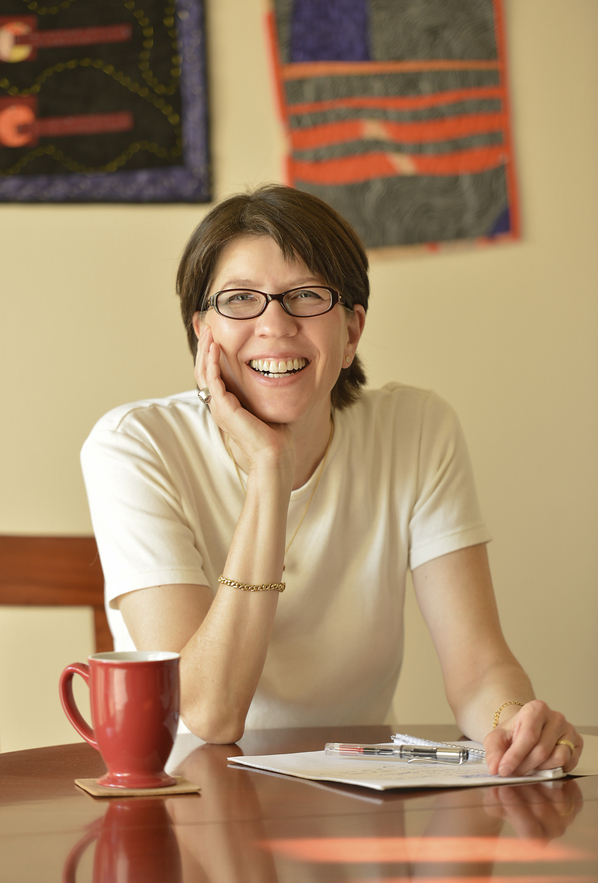
Alyson Books published a lesbian detective series by Elizabeth Sims, seen here

=== First lesbian-focused presses ===
The first lesbian publisher devoted to publishing lesbian and feminist books was Daughters, Inc. It was founded in Plainfield, Vermont, in 1973 by June Arnold and her partner Parke Bowman. That year, they published Rita Mae Brown's Rubyfruit Jungle, Arnold's The Cook and the Carpenter: A Novel by the Carpenter, and Blanche McCrary Boyd's Nerves, which all became lesbian classics. Rubyfruit Jungle achieved immense popularity, but Daughters, Inc. went out of business in 1977 after selling the book's rights to Bantam Books.

Naiad Press followed, which published the seminal lesbian romance novel Curious Wine (1983) by Katherine V. Forrest and many other books. Naiad became the largest and most profitable lesbian press and published a wide range of genre fiction. Barbara Grier, the press's co-founder, was sometimes criticized for not focusing on more academic content, but Grier argued that her press produced books people wanted or needed to read, especially working-class women and teenagers. The press closed in 2003 after 31 years. Grier handed off her books and operation to a newly established press, Bella Books. Established in 2001, Bella Books acquired the Naiad Press backlist, including the majority of works by Jane Rule and all the works of Karin Kallmaker. Their catalogue includes over 300 titles of lesbian romance, lesbian mystery and erotica.

In 1980, Felice Newman and Frederique Delacoste founded Cleis Press to highlight stories of women's resilience. They pivoted to focus on LGBTQ-inclusive sex-positive works. Also that year, Barbara Smith and Audre Lorde started Kitchen Table: Women of Color Press, founded along with Cherríe Moraga and Hattie Gossett, in order to enable publishing by other lesbian feminist women of color. The press had a large influence on third-wave feminism and lesbian literature. They published the second edition of This Bridge Called My Back, edited by Cherríe Moraga and Gloria Anzaldúa, Home Girls: A Black Feminist Anthology by Smith, and I Am Your Sister: Black Women Organizing Across Sexualities by Lorde.

In 1984, Nancy K. Bereano founded Firebrand Books, which published Trash by Dorothy Allison, Dykes to Watch Out For by Alison Bechdel, works by Jewelle Gomez and Cheryl Clarke, and Stone Butch Blues by Leslie Feinberg. Alyson Books, founded by Sasha Alyson, published a wide range of literature with gay and lesbian themes, and had similarities to Naiad Press. Alyson Books published some of the first LGBTQ children's books, like Heather Has Two Mommies by Lesléa Newman.

Other early publishers include Onlywomen Press, Sheba, Spinsters Ink (which was sold and now is part of the Bella Books organization), Rising Tide Press, Crossing Press, and New Victoria. In many cases, these presses were operated by authors who also published with the publication house, such as Barbara Wilson at Seal Press, which became part of the mainstream company Avalon Publishing, and Joan Drury at Spinsters Ink.

=== Expansion of lesbian literature ===
Lesbian and gay literature surged in the 1980s and 1990s, in part due to the growing number of small presses dedicated to publishing these works. The wave of publications was also due to the rise of women's, lesbian, and gay bookstores in the 1970s and 1980s that helped distribute these works. Lesbian presses also grew visibility by their involvement with annual American Bookseller Association expos during the late 1980s and 1990s. Organizations and awards like Publishing Triangle and Lambda Literary also supported the publishers and their works.

During the AIDS crisis, rising politicization and visibility compelled larger publishers to sign with a few lesbian authors, but after publishers felt disappointed by the sales of these authors' works, they withdrew. A number of independent presses shrank or closed during 1990s as well, including Alyson Books, Naiad Press, Kitchen Table: Women of Color Press, and Firebrand Books. However, RedBone Press began in 1995 with the goal to add Black representation to lesbian publishing and support queer Black communities.

=== Present-day lesbian presses ===
As of 2026, the current largest publishers of lesbian fiction are Bella Books, Bold Strokes Books, Bywater Books, and Flashpoint Publications, which acquired Regal Crest Enterprises (RCE) in January 2021. Flashpoint Publications/RCE has a catalog of lesbian romance, lesbian mystery, some erotica, sci-fi, fantasy, and sagas. Bold Strokes Books, established in 2005, publishes lesbian and gay male mystery, thrillers, sci-fi, adventure, and other LGBT genre books.

Smaller publishers of exclusively lesbian fiction include Bedazzled Ink, Intaglio Publications, Launch Point Press, Sapphire Books Publishing, Supposed Crimes, Wicked Publishing, and Ylva Publishing. In France they include Reines de Coeur, Dans L'Engrenage, and KTM Éditions.

Some small publishers continue to prioritize intersectional and genre-specific lesbian literature among a broader focus on feminist or queer literature. Recently active indie publishers include BLF Press, Catapult, Feminist Press, Kensington Publishing, Queen of Swords Press, and Virago Press. In India, small publishers that prioritize LGBTQ works, including lesbian literature, include Yoda Press, Seagull Books, Speaking Tiger, Westland Books, and Zubaan.

=== Self-publishing ===
Self-publishing has also become a common way for lesbian and transfeminine authors to share their work, due to the accessibility of online stores and the continued obstacles that mainstream publishers set for queer authors. Many self-published writers start on informal fandom-based writing platforms like AO3 and Scribble Hub, then sell novels as e-books or print-on-demand works, handling the book's marketing and distribution themselves. Alternately, some release their novels serially via subscription services like Patreon. Most online platforms have moderation policies that disproportionately censor and allow harassment toward marginalized users like queer women, making these methods of self-publishing somewhat precarious. Callisto Khan's The Zeus Constant (part of the expanded Gunmetal Olympus series) and M Zakharuk's Imago are recent works of lesbian literature published in this manner.

== Notable works ==
- The Well of Loneliness, Radclyffe Hall (1928)
- Zezé, Ángeles Vicente (1909)
- Nightwood, Djuna Barnes (1936)
- The Price of Salt, Patricia Highsmith (1952) – aka Carol (1990)
- Spring Fire, Vin Packer (1952)
- Rempart des Béguines, Françoise Mallet-Joris (1952)
- Chocolates for Breakfast, Pamela Moore (author) (1957)
- The Beebo Brinker Chronicles, Ann Bannon (1957–1962)
- Desert of the Heart, Jane Rule (1964)
- Patience & Sarah, Isabel Miller (1971)
- Rubyfruit Jungle, Rita Mae Brown (1973)
- Häutungen, Verena Stefan (1975)
- Sonja, Luise F. Pusch (1980)
- The Color Purple, Alice Walker (1982)
- Annie on My Mind, Nancy Garden (1982)
- The Swashbuckler, Lee Lynch (1983)
- Oranges Are Not the Only Fruit, Jeanette Winterson (1985)
- Memory Board, Jane Rule (1985)
- Send My Roots Rain, Ibis Gómez-Vega (1991)
- Along the Journey River, Carole LaFavor (1996)
- Memory Mambo, Achy Obejas (1996)
- Tipping the Velvet, Sarah Waters (1998)
- Fingersmith, Sarah Waters (2002)
- Garis Tepi Seorang Lesbian, Herlinatiens (2003)
- Southland, Nina Revoyr (2003)
- Stone Butch Blues, Leslie Feinberg (1993)
- Sugar Rush, Julie Burchill (2004)
- Ash, Malinda Lo (2009)

== Notable authors (alphabetically) ==
- Sarah Aldridge
- Dorothy Allison
- June Arnold
- Ann Bannon
- Natalie Barney
- Alison Bechdel
- Rita Mae Brown
- Julie Burchill
- Jessie Chandler
- Abha Dawesar
- Ellen DeGeneres
- Emma Donoghue
- Sarah Dreher
- Lillian Faderman
- Katherine V. Forrest
- Jocelyne François
- Jeanne Galzy
- Nancy Garden
- Alicia Gaspar de Alba
- Jewelle Gomez
- Ibis Gómez-Vega
- Nicola Griffith
- Rosa Guy
- Radclyffe Hall
- Bertha Harris
- Ellen Hart
- Karin Kallmaker
- Lori L. Lake
- Violette Leduc
- Carole LaFavor
- Malinda Lo
- Audre Lorde
- Lee Lynch
- Ann-Marie MacDonald
- Marijane Meaker; also published under the pseudonyms of:
  - Ann Aldrich
  - Mary James
  - M. E. Kerr
  - Vin Packer
  - Laura Winston
- Cherrie Moraga
- Val McDermid
- Qiu Miaojin
- Achy Obejas
- Julie Anne Peters
- Radclyffe (who also publishes as L. L. Raand)
- Mary Renault
- Nina Revoyr
- Adrienne Rich
- Alma Routsong (also publishes under the pseudonym Isabel Miller)
- Jane Rule
- Joanna Russ
- Sappho
- May Sarton
- Sarah Schulman
- Sandra Scoppettone
- Merry Shannon
- Elizabeth Sims
- Gertrude Stein
- tatiana de la tierra
- Michelle Tea
- Valerie Taylor
- Tereska Torrès
- Wu Tsao
- Ángeles Vicente
- Renée Vivien
- Ebine Yamaji
- Nobuko Yoshiya
- Sarah Waters
- Jeanette Winterson
- Monique Wittig
- Jacqueline Woodson
- Samar Yazbek

== See also ==
- Black lesbian literature
- Gay literature (historically, the term "gay literature" was often used to cover both gay male and lesbian literature)
- Lambda Literary Award for Lesbian Fiction
- Lesbian pulp fiction
- List of lesbian fiction (For a list of individual works in chronological order.)
- List of poets portraying sexual relations between women
- Yuri (genre) (Japanese anime, manga, light novels, and literature featuring intimate relationships between female characters)
