= Weirauch =

Weirauch is a surname. Notable people with the surname include:

- Anna Elisabet Weirauch (1887–1970), German writer
- Robin Weirauch (born 1957), American politician
