= Binnen-I =

Style for gender-neutral written German

In German, a medial capital I (German: Binnen-I) is a non-standard, mixed case typographic convention used to indicate gender inclusivity for nouns having to do with people, by using a capital letter 'I' inside the word (Binnenmajuskel, literally "internal capital", i.e. camel case) surrounded by lower-case letters. An example is the word LehrerInnen ("teachers", both male and female). With a lower case I in that position, Lehrerinnen is just the standard word for "female teachers".

The Binnen-I is a non-standard solution for how to economically express a position of gender equality in one German word, with an expression that would otherwise require three words. Since most English nouns (excluding pronouns) have no grammatical gender, words such as teacher(s), student(s), professor(s), and so on, can be used without implying the gender of the being(s) to which the noun refers. The situation in German, however, is more difficult since all nouns have one of three grammatical genders, masculine, feminine, or neuter.

When used with a noun designating a group of people, a Binnen-I indicates that the intended meaning of the word is both the feminine as well as the masculine forms, without having to write out both forms of the noun. It is formed from the feminine form of a noun containing the -in suffix (singular) or -innen suffix (plural). For example, Lehrerinnen (women teachers) would be written LehrerInnen, with the meaning (men and women) teachers, without having to write out both gender forms, or use the lexically unmarked masculine.

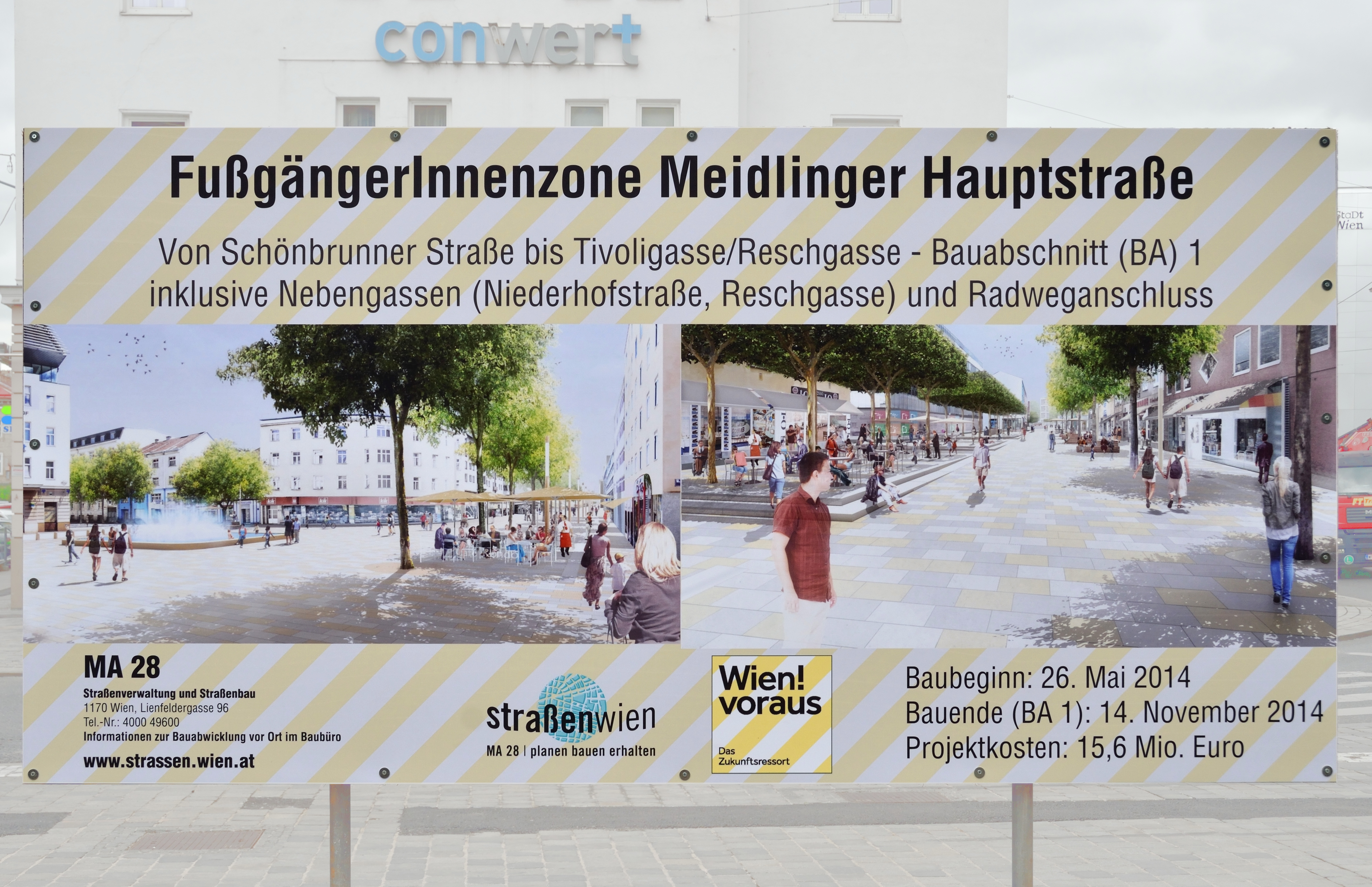
A pedestrian zone sign (Note: FußgängerInnenzone (pedestrian zone) from Fußgänger (pedestrian) + -Innen + Zone. The standard word for this in German is Fußgängerzone.) on the main street of Vienna's Meidling district, using internal-I FußgängerInnenzone

Other gender-inclusive typographic conventions exist in German that perform a similar function, such as the gender star.

== Background ==
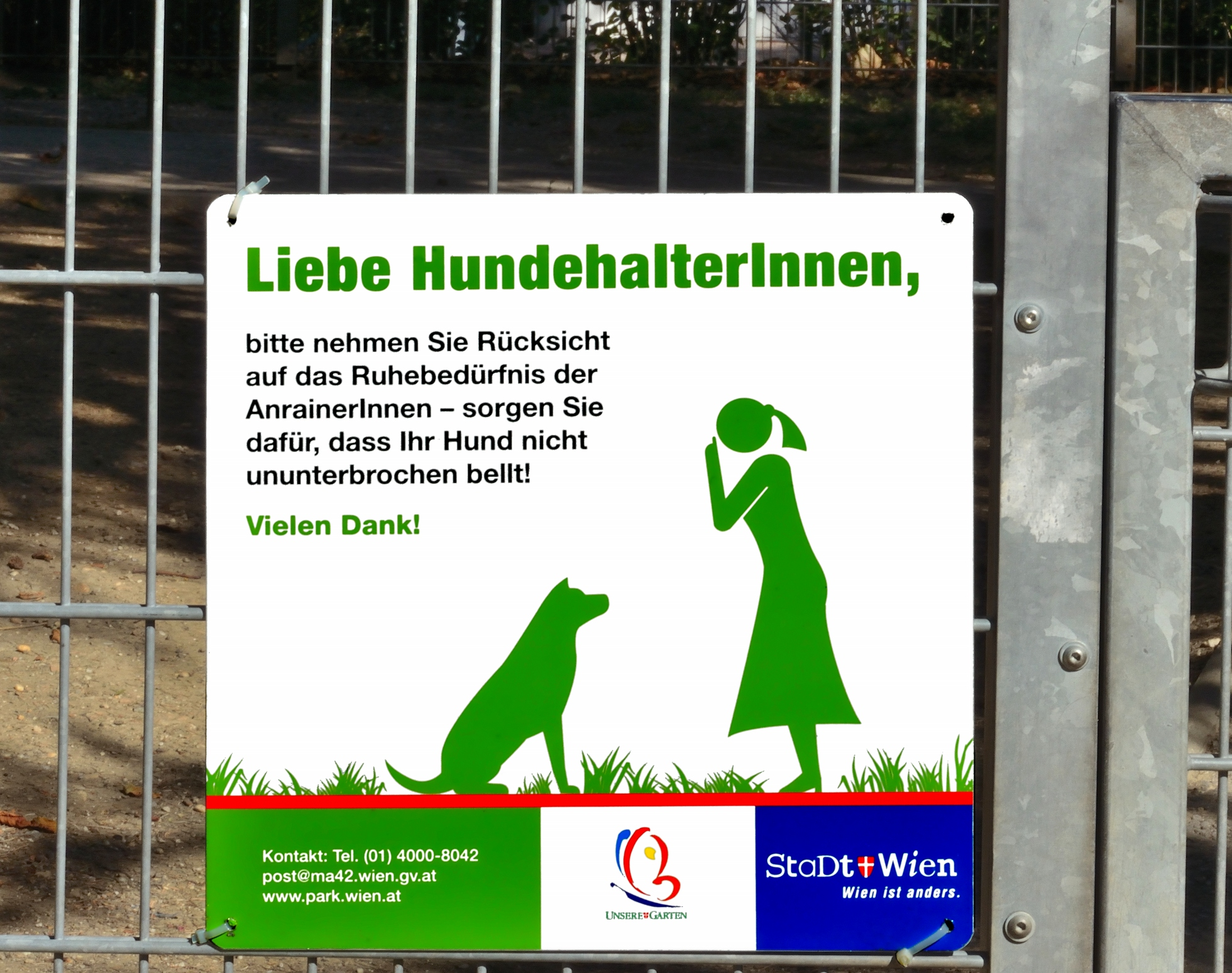
A sign for dog owners in a Vienna park with two Binnen-I examples (Note: Hundehalter is "dog owner", and HundehalterInnen is "male and female dog owners". In the full size image you can see AnrainerInnen (neighbors) as well. (The sign requests owners to keep their dogs from continuous barking for the sake of the neighbors.))

=== U.S. second wave ===
Part of the academic ferment in the United States in second-wave feminism in the 1970s was the attention paid to gender bias in language, including "the uncovering of the gendered nature of many linguistic rules and norms" and how the use of language could be analyzed from a feminist viewpoint. Studies showed the sexually biased use of language including "he" as a generic pronoun meaning both males and females and how this was not just an outgrowth of natural language evolution but in fact was enforced by prescriptivist (male) grammarians. By the 1980s and 1990s, feminist critique of language had spread to Germany and other countries.

=== Nouns and gender ===
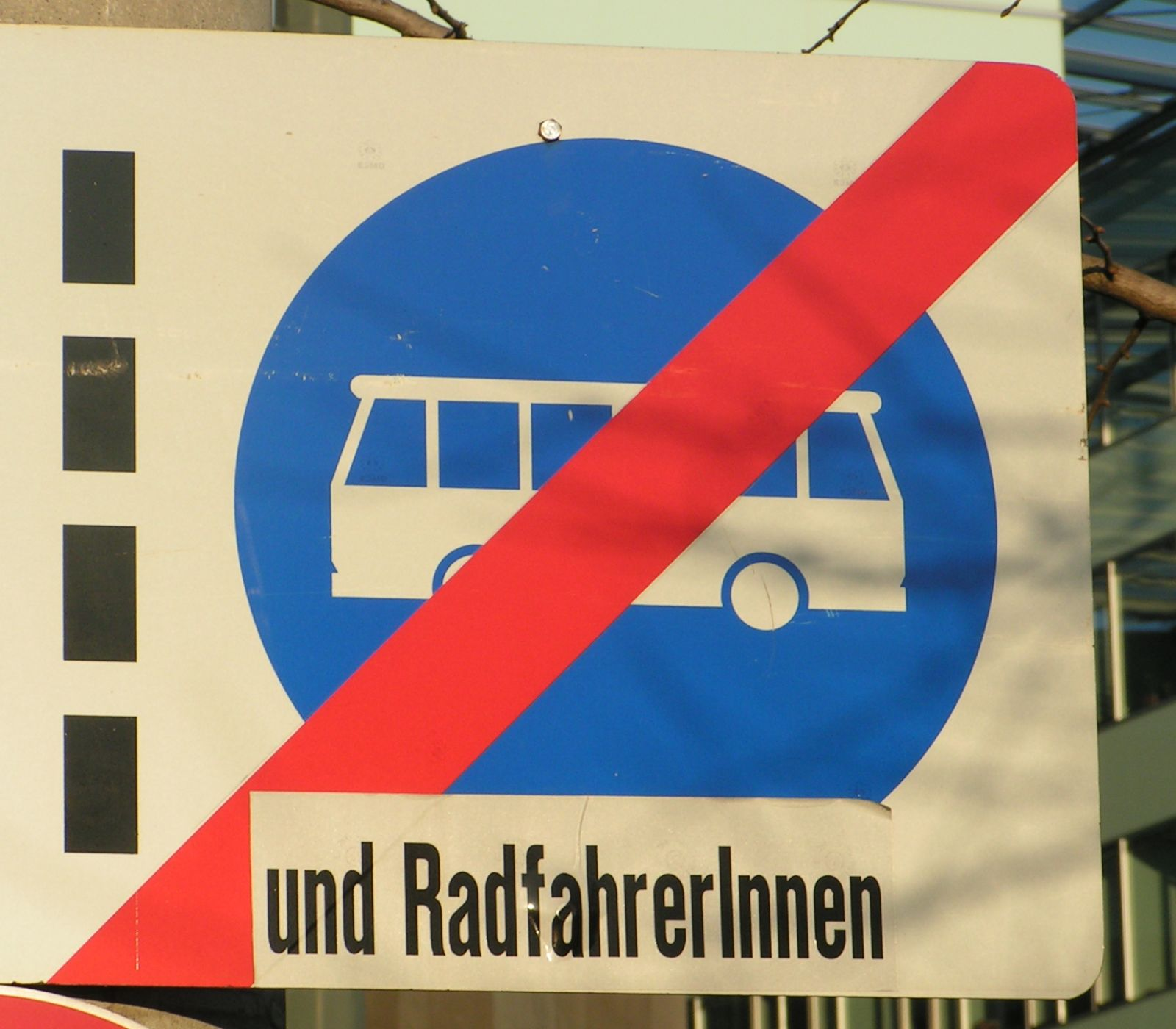
Example of Binnen-I: Radfahrer is "bicyclist", and RadfahrerInnen with the medial capital I is "male and female bicyclists", on a traffic sign in Linz, Austria

German has three genders: masculine, feminine, and neuter. With the exception of some relationship nouns (mother, father, daughter, etc.) that are tied to the sex of the person, the gender of a noun is arbitrary, and can be any one of the three; (Note: Certain word suffixes like -lein, -ung, -chen and others are tied to a certain noun gender, so are not arbitrary in that sense.) for example, masculine: Knoblauch (garlic); feminine: Steckrübe (turnip), Person (person); or neuter: Haus (house), Mädchen (girl).

In German, as to a lesser extent in English, some nouns designating people come in masculine/feminine pairs; in German they are often distinguished by an -in suffix in the feminine (Schauspieler/Schauspielerin), where English sometimes uses -ess (actor/actress). Similarly, in both languages the feminine form of such nouns is semantically marked and can only refer to a woman in each language, whereas the masculine form is unmarked and can designate either a man, if known, or an unknown person of indeterminate sex. In the plural, German generally has separate plurals for masculine and feminine (Juristen/Juristinnen: male attorneys/female attorneys).

In referring to a mixed (male/female) group of people, historically one would use the generic masculine, for example, Kollegen (masc. pl.; "colleagues"). To make it clear that both genders are included, one could use a three word phrase with the masculine and feminine versions of the noun joined by und ("and"), e.g. Kolleginnen und Kollegen (female colleagues and male colleagues).

== History ==
=== Feminist Sprachkritik ===
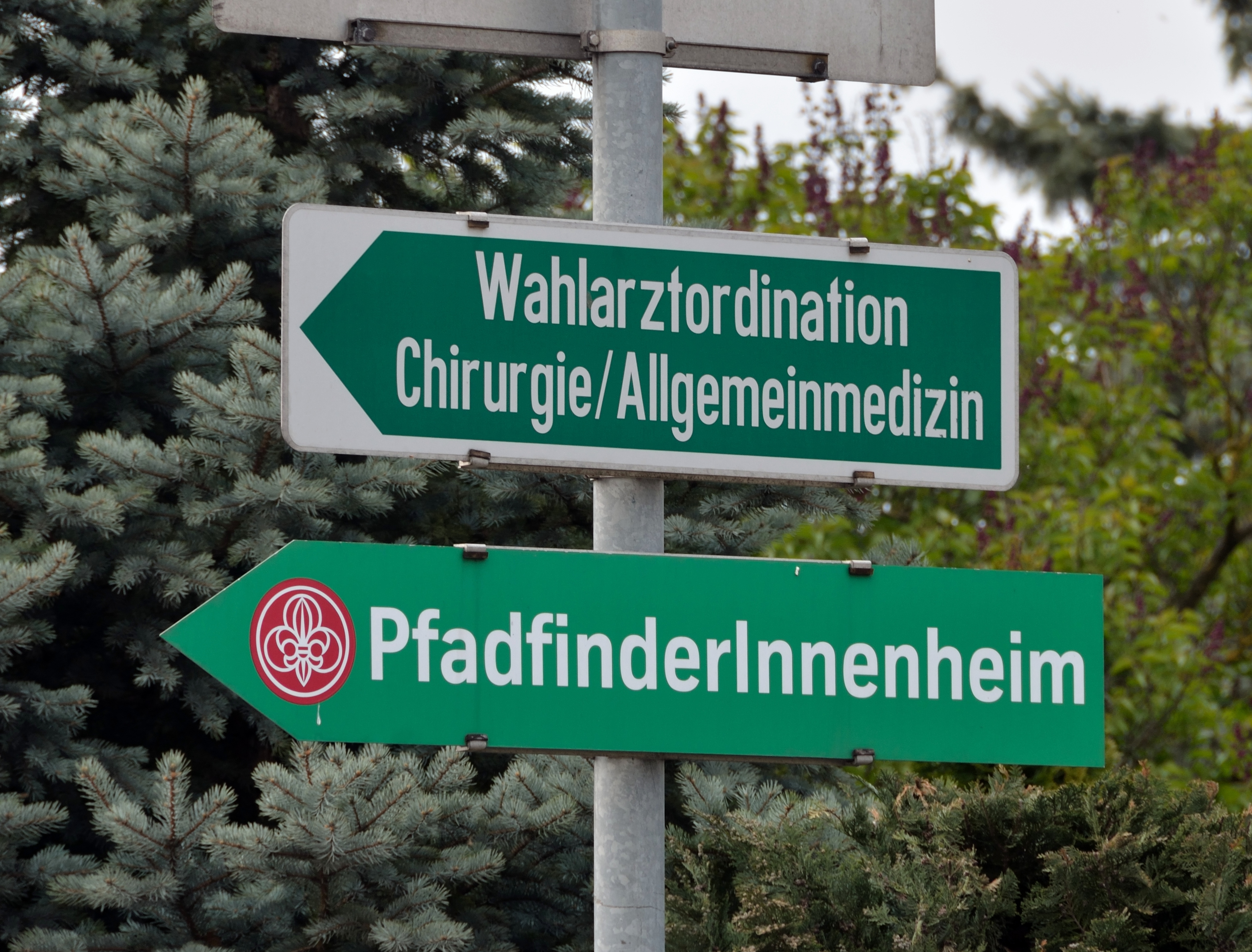
The bottom sign PfadfinderInnenheim points to a Scouting residence (Note: Pfadfinder is "[Boy] Scout" + Innen + Heim (shelter, hut, residence) gives PfadfinderInnenheim with Binnen-I, so: "Boy and Girl Scouts trail shelter.") for Boy and Girl Scouts in Gablitz, Austria.

At the end of the 1970s, groundbreaking work created the field of German feminist linguistics (Note: These groundbreaking works were by the pioneers in German feminist linguistics, Senta Trömel-Plötz, and Luise F. Pusch.) and critiqued both the inherent structure and usage of German on the one hand, and on the other, men's and women's language behavior, and concluded that German is antagonistic towards women (frauenfeindlich), for example, in the use of the generic masculine form when referring to mixed groups which makes women have no representation in the language, mirrors a "man's world," and makes it seem like students, professors, employees, bosses, politicians, every group spoken about—is male, and women were invisible in the patterns of speech; and went on to say that language doesn't only mirror reality, it creates it.

The use of medial capital I in Germany in this sense dates to the 1980s, in response to activism by German feminists for orthographic changes to promote gender equality in German writing. Some of this was called Frauendeutsch (women's German).

It is a solution to a problem of word economy: how do you avoid saying a three-word compound, e.g., Lehrer und Lehrerinnen (male teachers and female teachers) when you just want to say teachers in German? There are four methods, of varying levels of acceptance:

- Word pair with "and": Lehrer und Lehrerinnen (male teachers and female teachers); completely acceptable and standard
- Colon: Lehrer:in; Pl: Lehrer:innen
- Parentheses: Lehrer(in) (male teacher, (female teacher)); Pl: Lehrer(innen) (male teachers; (female teachers))
- Slash: Lehrer/in; Pl: Lehrer/innen
- internal-I: LehrerIn; pl: LehrerInnen

In 1990, this usage caused a kerfuffle in the Landtag of North Rhine-Westphalia, when an official complaint was lodged by the chair of the Free Democratic Party against the Green Party, who had used some words with medial capital I in some of their parliamentary motions, saying that it was "incorrect according to the German language". The President of the Landtag at the time responded by declaring that printed documents destined to be distributed throughout the state had to follow the official Duden language standard, until such time that the Duden accepted the capital I. The same year, the Wiesbaden Magistrate recommended the use of medial capital I for municipal office use, and prohibited the use of purely masculine terminology. The Wiesbaden women's affairs officer said that this had already been standard usage by the mayor and by some departments and agencies by 1990.

=== Usage and norms ===
Like French, Spanish, and other languages, but unlike English, the German language has a language academy, the Rat für deutsche Rechtschreibung (Council for German Orthography) that watches over the language, and prescribes spelling and usage in official dictionaries and usage guides, and publishes occasional reforms to the standards like the 1996 spelling reform. The twelve-volume Duden dictionary and language reference is the officially recognized standard reference of the language, reflecting the views of the Spelling Council.

As Binnen-I is a typographic convention, it is seen in writing, and the internal capital I does not affect pronunciation of a word written with Binnen-I. However, in some cases, there is an attempt to indicate the convention in pronunciation, by using a glottal stop to create a momentary pause before the 'I'.

== Other methods ==
Other nonstandard typographic conventions exist in German for promoting gender-inclusivity, including use of a slash, colon, parentheses, an underscore (called the gender gap), or an asterisk (the gender star).

=== Gender star ===
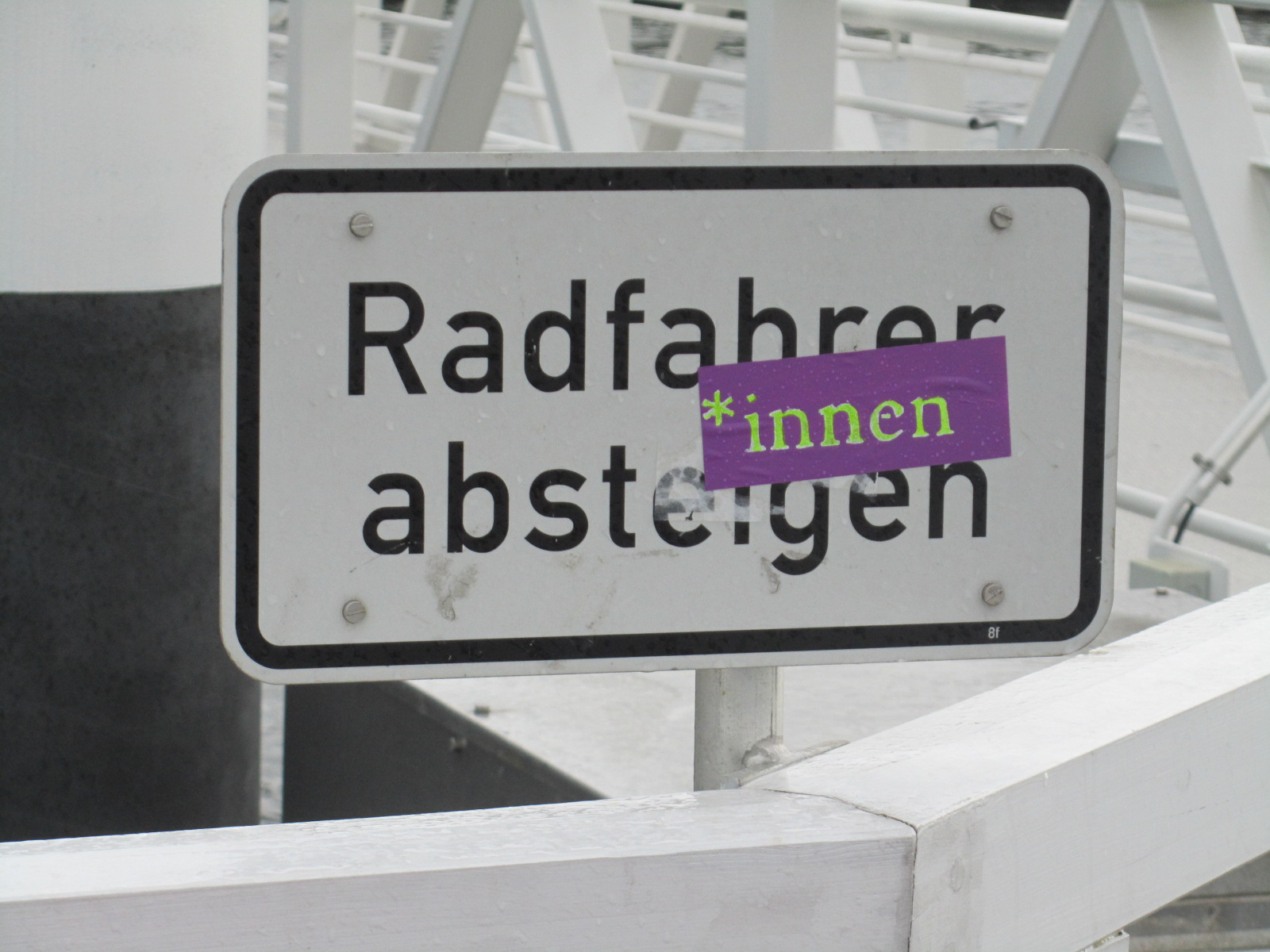
This sign, reading "Radfahrer absteigen" (Cyclists, dismount), has been amended with a gender star to make it gender-neutral.

The gender star is another recent, nonstandard typographic convention influenced by feminist linguistics. This convention uses an asterisk before the –innen suffix to perform the same function as the medial capital 'I' does for Binnen-I. Since the asterisk resembles a star, when used for this function, the asterisk is referred to as the Gendersternchen; literally, "little gender star".

The gender star was put forward as an improvement on the Binnen-I, which was seen as too beholden to the gender binary, whereas the asterisk allowed other, non-binary genders to be included. It started off being used in universities, was then adopted by public administrations and other institutions, and finally ended up being officially adopted by the Green party in 2015 as a way to avoid discrimination against transgender and intersex individuals, and others. Since 2017, it is part of the official regulations of the Berlin Senate.

Gender star was named German Anglicism of the Year in 2018.

The gender star is pronounced by some people, who employ a glottal stop to mark it. (In situations other than this one, the stop sometimes occurs at the beginning of a word, and sometimes in the middle, but never before suffixes.)

Luise Pusch criticized the gender star because it fails to get rid of the "linguistic invisibility of women". It symbolizes, as do the slash or the parenthesis typographic conventions, that women are "the second choice."

== See also ==
- Capitalization
- Capitalization in English
- Feminist language reform
- Gender-neutral language
- Gender-neutral pronoun
- Gender role in language
- German orthography
- Grammatical gender
- Language and gender
- Language and thought
- Lavender linguistics
- Letter case
- Sapir–Whorf hypothesis
- Women's studies
