= Ruth Fuller Field =

American lesbian writer (1864–1935)

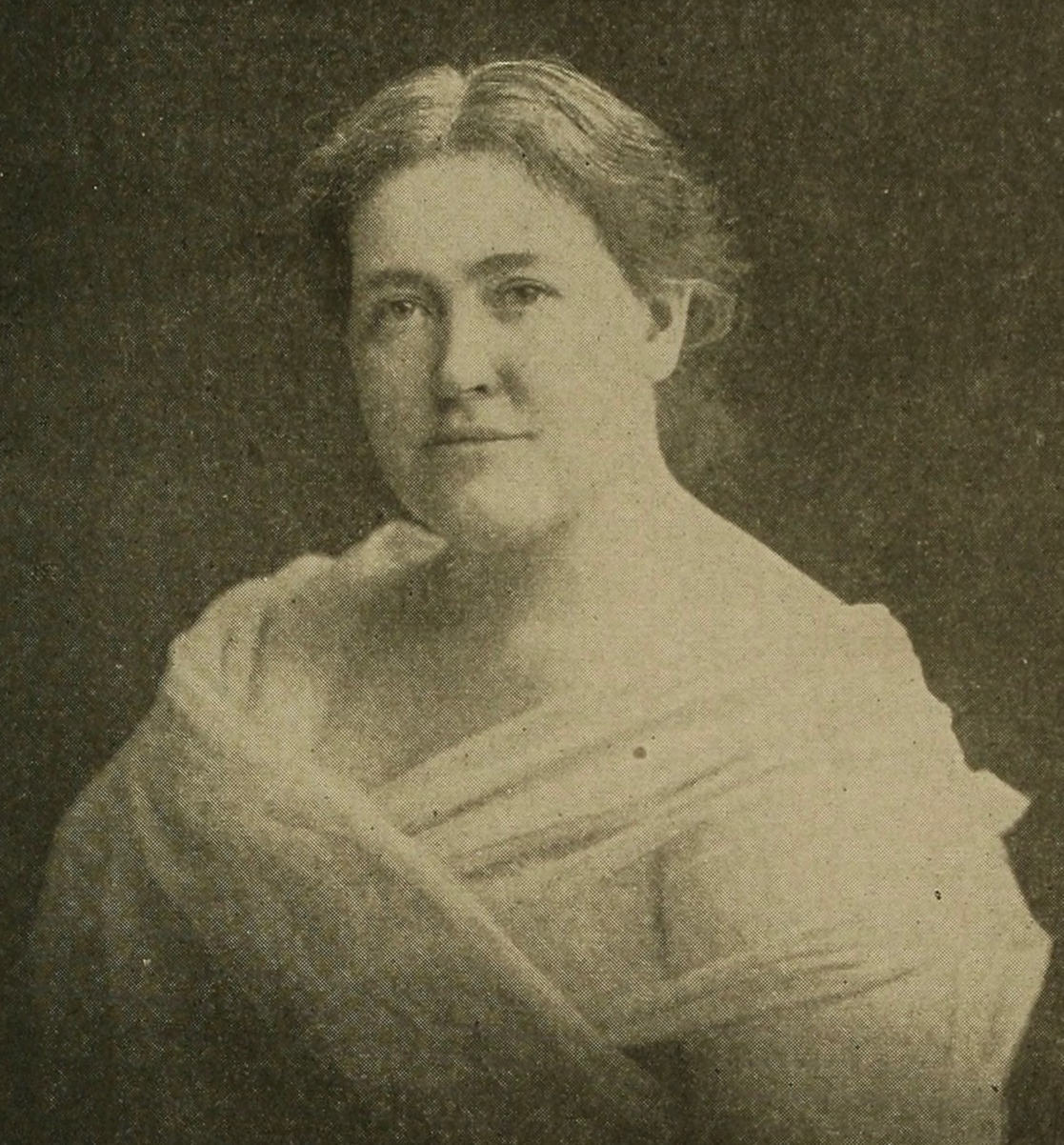
- Ruth Fuller Field
- Born: Ruth White Fuller; June 17, 1864; Deerfield, Massachusetts
- Died: February 22, 1935 (aged 70); Tujunga, California
- Education: Illinois Industrial University
- Spouse: Frank A. Field (m. 1887, divorced)
- Partner: Emma Elizabeth Altman (1894–1908)
- Writing career
- Pen name: Mary Casal
- Genres: Autobiography, lesbian literature
- Notable work: The Stone Wall

Ruth Fuller Field (June 17, 1864 – February 22, 1935), also known by her pen name Mary Casal, was an American writer known for writing The Stone Wall, the first known autobiography of a lesbian woman in the United States.

== Early life and education ==
Ruth White Fuller was born on June 17, 1864, in Deerfield, Massachusetts, into a middle-class family, to Joseph Negus Fuller and Lydia Ann White. She had eight siblings, and was the youngest of the family. Her uncle was the painter George Fuller. She was prone to socialize mainly with boys in Deerfield. As a child, she attended Deerfield Academy, where she met her first girlfriend.

After completing her primary education, Fuller attended Illinois Industrial University (now the University of Illinois Urbana-Champaign). She studied literature and science, and served as secretary for the student government before dropping out in 1883.

== Adult life ==
After leaving IIU, she began working as a schoolteacher at a girls' day school in Beacon Hill, Boston. She married Frank A. Field on October 12, 1887. The pair divorced by 1894 following stillbirths in 1889 and 1891 and extramarital affairs. The father of the second stillbirth was alleged to be William McMurtrie, "The Professor" in The Stone Wall.

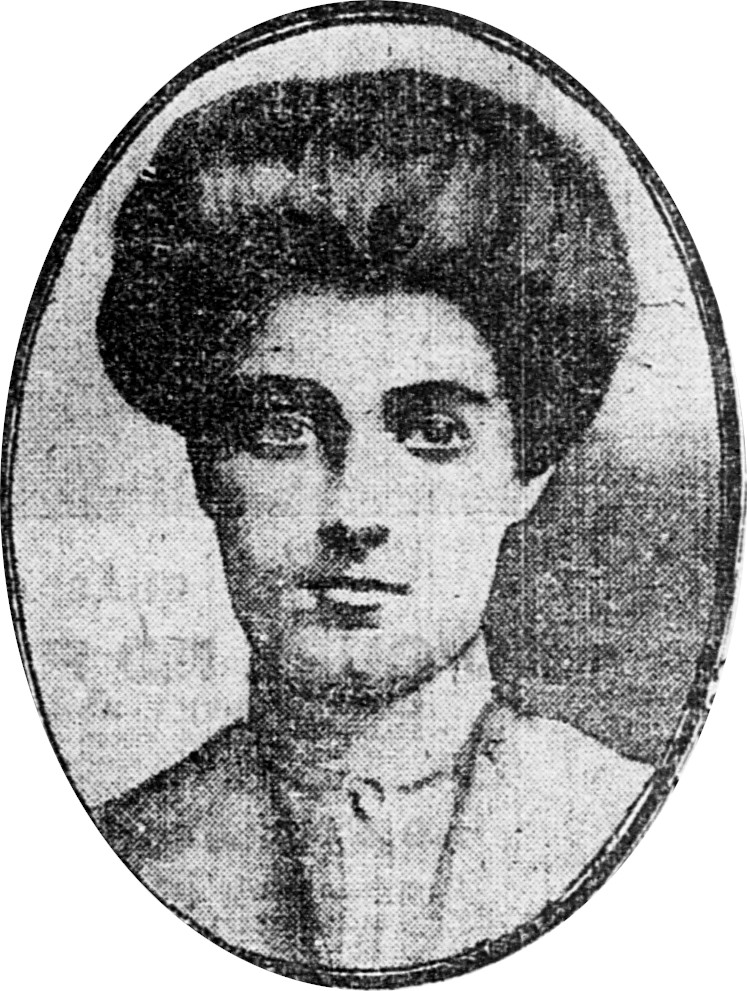
Fuller's partner, Emma Elizabeth Altman, known as "Juno" in The Stone Wall

Following the separation, Fuller patented a children's toy. Her entrepreneurship is especially notable because it went against the traditional womanly values at the time. While working on and advertising the toy, she traveled further northeast and closer to New York City. It is during her stay at the Margaret Lousia Home in New York City that she met Emma Elizabeth Altman, dubbed "Juno" in her autobiography, and they quickly fell in love. Fuller and Altman were married in a private ceremony in 1894.

Fuller dropped her toy business and ran a school with Altman within their home, working as a commercial artist in the process. Altman later became engaged to "Jack", a gay man, leading Fuller to travel Europe for two years. Fuller and Altman's relationship ended, as well as their friendship, but they continued to correspond with one another.

Fuller worked as secretary of the Chamber of Commerce in Napa, California. She lived in California until her death in 1935 after living there for 20 years. Fuller died of chronic myocarditis and arteriosclerosis in Tujunga, California, on February 22, 1935.

== The Stone Wall ==
Prompted by editor Douglas Crawford McMurtrie, Fuller wrote the autobiography The Stone Wall in 1928 and 1929. It was published by Eyncourt Press in 1930, under the pseudonym Mary Casal, when Fuller was 65 years old. Her true identity was kept secret due to the nature of the writing, as she wished not to expose herself or those who she had had relationships with. The autobiography accounts her life as a queer woman during the late 19th and early 20th centuries. It details the relationships she had in secret with other women. Many of these women were given aliases in order to protect their identities, including her teacher while attending Deerfield Academy, "Flo", and most notably, "Juno", who she remained in a relationship with for the longest period of time.

Fuller's true identity wasn't discovered until 2003, during research carried out by Sherry Ann Darling for her doctoral thesis at Tufts University.

=== The Stone Wall's influence ===
Fuller's impact on queer communities created various spaces for acceptance in a time full of strife concerning LGBTQ+ rights. Some stories have linked the autobiography's name to Bonnie's Stone Wall (later the Stonewall Inn) in Greenwich Village, a tearoom which opened the same year the book was released.

Fuller's work inspired other literature, including Barbara Grier's Lesbian Lives: Biographies of Women from the Ladder.
