= Cristina Peri Rossi =

Uruguayan novelist, poet, translator, and author of short stories

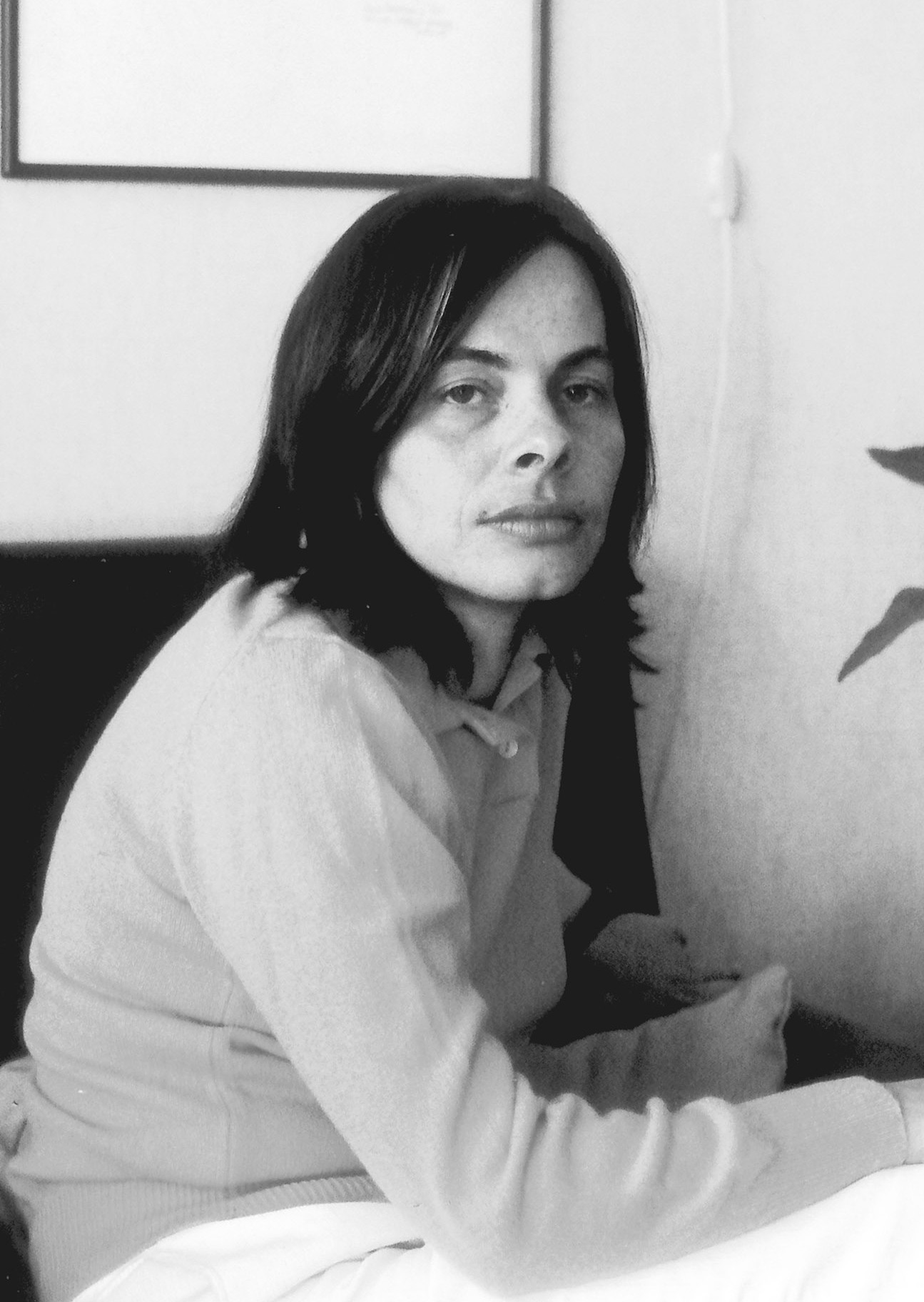
- Cristina Peri Rossi in 1986
- Born: 12 November 1941 (age 84); Montevideo, Uruguay
- Citizenship: Uruguay • Spain
- Education: University of the Republic
- Occupations: Novelist, poet, translator, journalist, and author
- Awards: John Simon Guggenheim Fellowship (1994) Miguel de Cervantes Prize (2021)

Cristina Peri Rossi (born 12 November 1941) is a Uruguayan novelist, poet, translator, and author of short stories.

Considered a leading light of the post-1960s period of prominence of the Latin-American novel, she has written more than 37 works. She has been a pioneer and one of the female authors associated to the Latin American Boom. Peri Rossi has lived in Barcelona since 1972, after a civic-military dictatorship was established in Uruguay and censored her works. She has translated into Spanish authors such as Clarice Lispector and Monique Wittig. She has worked for several newspapers and media agencies such as Diario 16, El Periódico and Agencia EFE.

Peri Rossi won the Miguel de Cervantes Prize in 2021, the most prestigious literary award in the Spanish-speaking world.

== Life ==
She was born in Montevideo, Uruguay, 12 November 1941, but was exiled in 1972 after a civic-military dictatorship was established. She moved to Spain, where she became a citizen in 1975. As of 2024 she lives in Barcelona, where she continues to write fiction and work as a journalist. She studied at the University of the Republic.

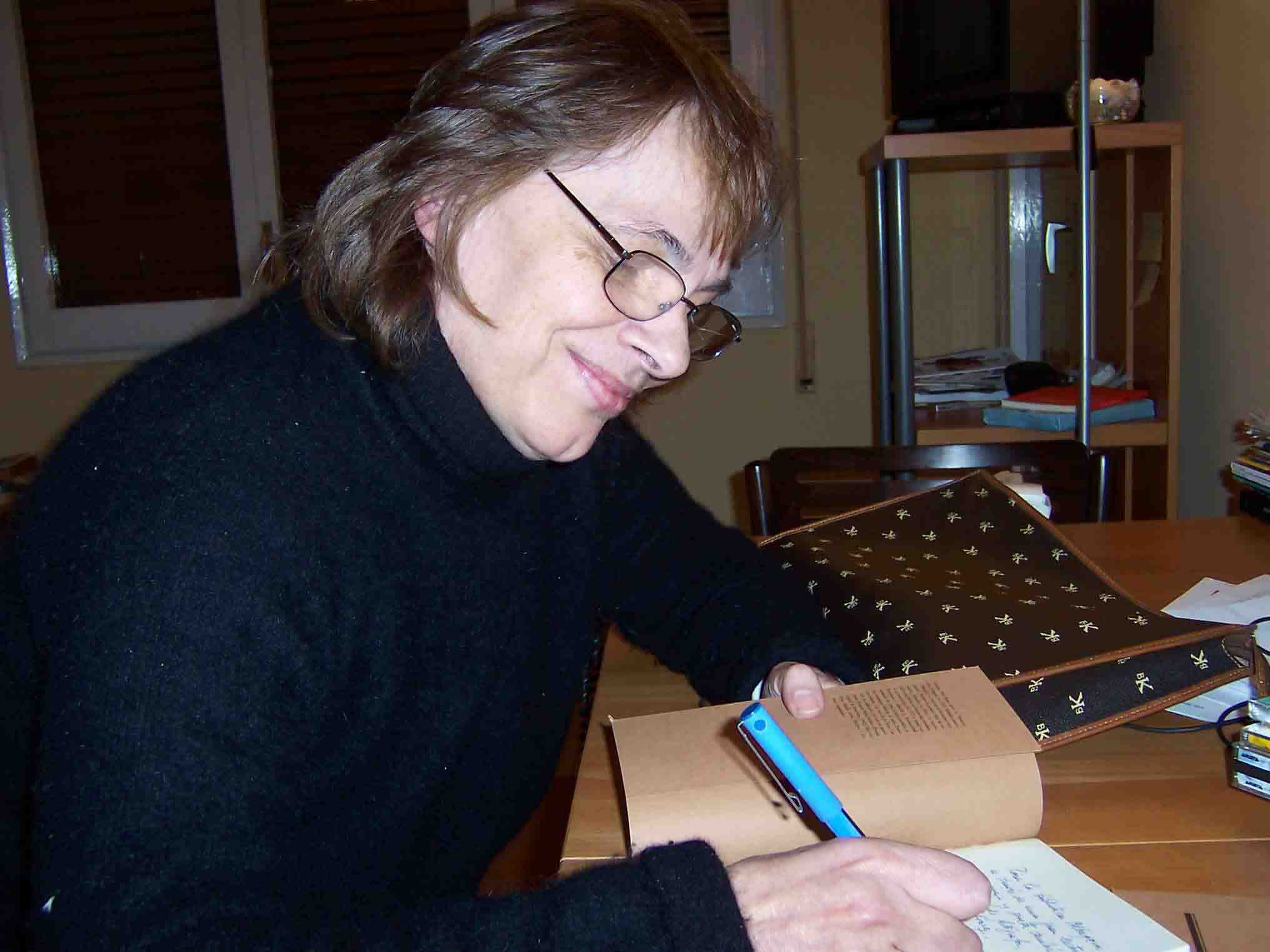
Peri Rossi in 2004

== Journalism ==
Cristina Peri Rossi is active as a journalist and political commentator in Barcelona. She is a radio journalist for the public Catalan station Catalunya Radio. She was fired from this position in October 2007 and accused the station of 'linguistic persecution', claiming she was fired for speaking Spanish instead of Catalan. She was later re-instated to her post after an outcry.

She is well known for her defense of civil liberties and freedom of expression. She has long supported gay marriage and welcomed Spain's decision to recognize it.

In an El Mundo article in March 2006, she spoke out against the rise of religious extremism in Europe, and specifically the violence that followed the 'Danish Cartoons Affair'. In the article she expresses her support to the 'Together Facing the New Totalitarianism' Manifesto, which was published in the left-leaning French weekly Charlie Hebdo in March 2006.

== Literary criticism ==
She was part of the Latin American Boom, a movement associated with authors such as Gabriel García Márquez, Mario Vargas Llosa, Julio Cortázar and Carlos Fuentes.

La nave de los locos (The Ship of Fools) (1984) is generally regarded by critics as Peri Rossi's most important work. It is an experimental novel which takes the form of a pastiche of travel writing. The protagonist, Equis, is a misfit who travels to a number of deliberately vague locations. By inviting the reader to see modern society through the eyes of Equis, Peri Rossi is using the technique of defamiliarisation to produce a biting satire of today's world. This includes a strong dose of feminism: Equis eventually renounces his own sexuality, declaring that there is "harmony in impotence," which can be read as a denouncement of patriarchial and phallogocentric society. More generally, the work shows toleration and arguably even idealisation of sexualities that have been traditionally considered dissident, including gerontophilia and controversially, in the character Morris' love for a ten-year-old boy, pedophilia. The novel exposes the dangers of arbitrary dictatorial government in its inclusion an emotional depiction of a concentration camp in a country which remains unspecified, but which could be based on any of the various Latin American dictatorships of the latter half of the twentieth century. The title of the book is taken from the Ship of Fools legend, which is reworked by Peri Rossi in the novel itself. The novel shows sympathy for those condemned to the ship of fools and there is a clear parallel between this medieval episode and the modern-day aforementioned concentration camp passage.

The themes established in La nave de los locos are ones which Rossi revisits in other works. Her latest novels include Solitario de amor (Solitaire of Love) (1989), La última noche de Dostoievski (Dostoyevsky's Last Night) (1992) and El amor es una droga dura (Love is a hard drug) (1999). All of these novels are formally less experimental than Nave. They deal with male protagonists who, like Equis, gradually explore their sexualities, discovering that they have to renounce traditional gender roles both in sexual behaviour and in the real world to find fulfilment. However, there is little political commentary in these novels.

Peri Rossi has also produced an impressive amount of poetry, again covering many of the ideas outlined above. The lesbian eroticism of Evohé (1971) caused a scandal when first released.

In 2004, Peri Rossi published Por fin solos, a collection of short stories where love is a result of eroticism and frustration. The lovers, whatever their condition or sex, seek a reason in the beloved so that they may feel saved, as is the case in "Náufragos". Peri Rossi also uses (determinedly) symbols that link with the deterioration of heterosexual relationships, such as the bottle of lye, the scarf, and flowers, among others. Peri Rossi's book Estrategias del Deseo, which was also published in 2004, was found so moving and inspiring by Latina lesbian writer Tatiana de la tierra that de la tierra decided to translate the book to English (Strategies of Desire).

== Complete list of published works ==
=== Short stories ===
- Viviendo (1963). "Living"
- Los museos abandonados (1968). "Abandoned Museums"
- Indicios pánicos (1970). Panic Signs, trans. Mercedes Rowinsky-Geurts and Angelo A. Borrás (Wilfrid Laurier University Press, 2002). ISBN 9780889203938, OCLC 48670868
- La tarde del dinosaurio (1976). Afternoon of the Dinosaur, trans. Robert S. Rudder and Gloria Chacón de Arjona (Svenson Publishers, 2014). ISBN 9780615955636, OCLC 922699405
- La rebelión de los niños (1980). "Kids' Rebellion"
- El museo de los esfuerzos inútiles (1983). The Museum of Useless Efforts, trans. Tobias Hecht (University of Nebraska Press, 2001)
- Una pasión prohibida (1986). A Forbidden Passion, trans. Mary Jane Treacy (Cleis Press, 1993). ISBN 9780939416684, OCLC 928973419
- Cosmoagonías (1988). "Cosmoagonies"
- La ciudad de Luzbel y otros relatos (1992). "Luzbel's City and Other Stories"
- Desastres íntimos (1997). Intimate Disasters, trans. Robert S. Rudder and Ignacio López-Calvo (Latin American Literary Review Press, 2014). ISBN 9781891270543, OCLC 893317150
- Por fin solos (2004). "Alone At Last"

=== Novels ===
- El libro de mis primos (1969). "My Cousin's Book"
- La nave de los locos (1984). The Ship of Fools, trans. Psiche Hughes (Readers International, 1999). ISBN 9780930523541, OCLC 46541921
- Solitario de amor (1988). Solitaire of Love, trans. Robert S. Rudder and Gloria Arjona (Duke University Press, 2000). ISBN 9780822325406, OCLC 254438360
- La última noche de Dostoievski (1992). Dostoevsky's Last Night (Picador, 1996). ISBN 9780312143220, OCLC 35126155
- El amor es una droga dura (1999). "Love is a Hard Drug"

=== Poetry ===
- Evohé (1971). Erotic Poems (bilingual text), trans. Diana P. Decker (Azul Editions, 1994). ISBN 9780963236357, OCLC 31602897
- Descripción de un naufragio (1974). "Description of a Shipwreck"
- Diáspora (1976). "Diaspora"
- Lingüística general (1979). "General Linguistics"
- Europa después de la lluvia (1987). "Post-Rain Europe"
- Babel bárbara (1991)
- Otra vez Eros (1994). "Eros, Again"
- Aquella noche (1996). "That Night"
- Inmovilidad de los barcos (1997). "Ships's Stiffness"
- Poemas de amor y desamor (1998). "Poems of Love and Lovelessness"
- Las musas inquietantes (1999). "The Disturbing Muses"
- Estado de exilio (2003). State of Exile (bilingual text), trans. Marilyn Buck (City Lights Books, 2008)
- Estrategias del deseo (2004). "Strategies of Desire"
- Habitación de hotel (2007). "Hotel Room"
- La ronda de la vida (2023). "The Lap of Life"

=== Essays ===
- Fantasías eróticas (1990). "Erotic Fantasies"
- Acerca de la escritura (1991). "On Writing"

=== In anthologies ===
- Majorie Agosin, (ed) These are Not Sweet Girls: Poetry by Latin American Women, White Pine Press, New York, 1998. (English translations of poetry by Cristina Peri Rossi, Gabriela Mistral, and Giannina Braschi).
- The Best of Review: Celebrating the Americas Society's 40th Anniversary, editors Tess O'Dwyer and Doris Sommer, Routledge, Francis & Taylor, London, 2005. (English translation excerpts of Latin American literary classics by Cristina Peri Rossi and her contemporaries Luisa Valenzuela, Gabriel Garcia Marquez, Derek Walcott, and Giannina Braschi).
