= Sonja (novel) =

1980 autobiographical novel by Luise F. Pusch

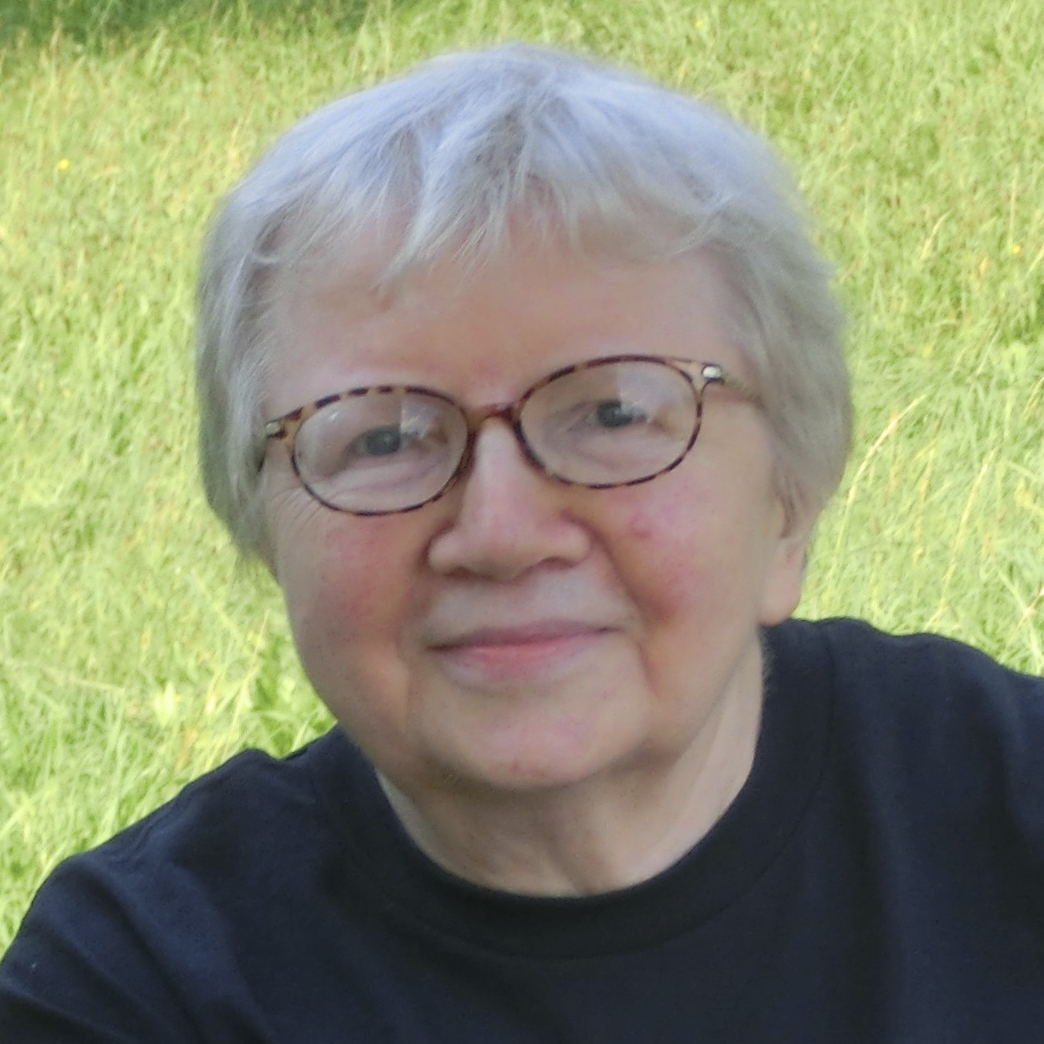
Prof. Dr. Luise F. Pusch, 2013

Sonja. Eine Melancholie für Fortgeschrittene (Sonja: Melancholia for Intermediates) is a German autobiographical novel from 1980. Written between 1976 and 1979, it was published under the pseudonym Judith Offenbach. It was not until 1998 that German linguist Luise F. Pusch made public that she was the author. The novel depicts the breakup of Judith and Sonja's love under the weight of societal conditions, culminating in Sonja's suicide, and Judith's subsequent period of mourning, reflection, and realization. The events were based on Pusch's life and were only slightly changed.

The book was widely reviewed in Germany and Switzerland at the time and is now considered the "most important text on understanding lesbian life" of the 1980s in German.

== Plot ==
In 1965, Judith is a student of medieval studies at the University of Hamburg. She lives in a student dormitory and meets Sonja, who has been a paraplegic since a suicide attempt in 1962. They fall in love and live together in the dorm for the next two and a half years, then move into a small apartment. In public, Judith is mostly perceived as Sonja's "caregiver." Their attempt at a "normal" life together suffers on the one hand from the limitations of Sonja, who is a wheelchair user, and above all from the fact that neither of them is openly lesbian. Judith, in particular, is downright panicked about being recognized as a lesbian and thus jeopardizing her academic career. Judith's inner separation from her partnership with Sonja leads to a crisis in the relationship, in which Sonja then also develops an alcohol addiction. In 1973 Judith separates from Sonja and moves to Bremen, Sonja tries to force Judith's return by attempting suicide, but Judith rejects this. In the following years, Sonja makes two more attempts to kill herself, until a third succeeds in March 1976.

After Sonja's death, Judith begins to reflect on the relationship, her role in it, and the failure. She starts psychotherapy, has new relationships, works on her academic career and writes the "Sonja book". Increasingly, she realizes how much the societal circumstances, shaped by homophobia, were responsible for the failure of their love and the death of Sonja.

== Text ==
Pusch began psychotherapy shortly before Sonja's death; her therapist encouraged her to write down the story of their relationship. Originally, Pusch intended the novel to be "a, my declaration of love" to Sonja, "a monument" to her. Then, as she reflected on the events, the motif of social conditions became more relevant: "I also attributed her death to the inhumane conditions under which lesbians had to live at that time [...] Society had made us guilty of something that deserved to be written down." During the writing process, she read the resulting texts to her psychotherapist and later to a lesbian group in Zurich, where she discussed them.

The novel is strictly autobiographical; Pusch essentially changed only details such as names, courses of study, or dates. The diary-like text is divided into three parts with 83 chapters, each headed with the date of writing and ranging from August 24, 1976, a few months after Sonja's death, to November 12, 1979, when the writing of the book was completed. Two time levels overlap, on the one hand that of the events described from 1965 to 1976 and on the other hand that of the writing of the book from 1976 to 1979. The chapters usually begin with a brief description of present situations or events before recounting her and Sonja's story in retrospect, from Judith's memory.

== Pseudonym ==
In order not to jeopardize her academic career by coming out as a lesbian (Pusch was already working on her habilitation at the time of writing) and out of consideration for Sonja's family, Pusch decided to publish the novel under a pseudonym. In the book's blurb, Pusch even invented a fictional biography—closely based on her own—for Judith Offenbach. She took the name from looking through her record collection, during which, at the suggestion of a friend, she stuck with the name of Jacques Offenbach, which she combined with Judith as a female name, among other things, because of the "symbolism with Judith: a combative woman". Although the identity of the author was not an absolute secret even in contemporary times (for example, Pusch's female students knew her identity), Pusch only resolved the pseudonym publicly with the new edition in 1998.

In addition to the novel, Pusch used the pseudonym for the publications of two stories and a book review in the Swiss lesbian magazine Lesbenfront (Lesbian front) between 1981 and 1987. In the same magazine, a preprint from Sonja appeared in 1978 under the title "Erinnerungen an Sandra" and the author's pseudonym "Anna", as well as an interview with "Judith Offenbach" after the publication of the novel.

Sonja was published by the renowned publishing house Suhrkamp Verlag and had reached its fourth edition in 1989 with 32,000 copies sold. In 1998, it was published in a new edition, for the first time under the author's real name. In 2006, 42,000 copies had been sold. In 2022 it was in its eighth edition.

Sonja was widely received at the time, especially in the German women's and lesbian movement; naturally, the adequate reflection of specific women's or lesbian themes was in the foreground here. Feminist literary critics dealt with the book only in passing and to "Offenbach's" disadvantage. Sigrid Weigel criticized the lack of linguistic-literary work on the text, Marianne Schuller and Jutta Kolckenbrock-Netz slated the novel as a "sensationalist story of lesbian love with a fatal outcome [...], which lacks any kind of linguistic representation and thus literary communication skills." Evelyne Keitel alone conceded that "from a purely formal point of view, the constant repetition of the same thing over and over again is the condition for the text to be experienced not only intellectually but also emotionally as distressing."

Much more positive reviews in magazines of the women's and lesbian movement, on the other hand, emphasized the aspect of the book's realism and often drew comparisons with one's own life experiences. In the lesbian magazine Lesbenfront it was said "I find so much shit in what Sonja and you have given one to another, and yet I can't really set myself apart from you, because I recognize myself in your text, our situation as women and especially lesbians". Alexandra von Grote wrote in the feminist magazine Courage "Clear as seldom I learn from this book, how it comes to the state of self-disempowerment, which we often know in lesbian relationships, and what this state entails." In Germanys most renowned feminist magazine EMMA, the reviewer noted that she "read this book almost in one piece. Much in it reminds me of lesbian women's own and familiar experiences: sexual inexperience and inhibition, isolation as a couple from normal lesbian and natural heterosexual friends, for example, or the struggle to be accepted by parents." In her review for Swiss feminist magazine Emancipation, Veronica Schaller described her skeptical attitude toward the protagonist while reading, but summed up "perhaps precisely because of the many question marks, the book remains fascinating to me. Not only because of the content, but also because of the style of writing."

The reception by the audience was intense. Numerous lesbian women recognized traits of their own lives in the story, especially the aspect of internalized homophobia that turned into self-hatred—or as "Offenbach" said in an interview, "the connections between my fears and all the societal pressures.", spoke from the soul of many women. Pusch received numerous letters from readers that made it clear how much the book acted as a "survival aid"; some women felt so close to her that they even fell in love with "Offenbach" and wanted to meet her. In the preface to the new edition in 1999, Pusch wrote: "After I published Sonja, I received many letters from women who took certain things from the book as their model. Some, for example, put an ad in the EMMA, others began to write down their "most intimate" experiences and made them public, others joined a lesbian group. [...] That's how (women's) movement and change come about. I, too, only dared to do so because others had gone ahead."

The novel was also reviewed by mainstream media such as FAZ, Aspekte, Deutsches Allgemeines Sonntagsblatt, Stern, Basler Zeitung, or Norddeutscher Rundfunk. These occasionally over-emphasized the "sensationalist" elements of the novel (lesbianism, disability, suicide, and a pseudonymous author), but occasionally also criticized that the novel was not "literary" enough, a claim that Pusch, however, also rejected: "The book had no claim to artistic quality ... [...] I wrote my book in the same style as I wrote letters to girlfriends, it was supposed to be easy to read, understandable, direct, authentic. No literary show-off: "Look how beautifully I can write!"" Regardless of this, the novel was nominated for the Aspekte-Literaturpreis.

Today, according to Madeleine Marti, Sonja is considered the "most important text for understanding lesbian life" of 1980 Germanys; she states that (in Germany) "Judith Offenbach's book played a significant role in shaping the public image and the self-image of lesbians.". In 2023, Jan Feddersen emphasized how much the novel already anticipated the new memoir format, which was only beginning to establish itself at the beginning of the 21st century.
