= Ibis Gómez-Vega =

Cuban-American Latina author (born 1952)

Ibis del Carmen Gómez-Vega (born 20 December 1952) is a Cuban-American Latina novelist, short story writer, playwright, and literary critic. She is an associate professor of twentieth-century American literature, ethnic literature, American drama, and gay and lesbian literature in the department of English at Northern Illinois University.

== Biography ==
Gómez-Vega was born in the back of a taxi cab Havana, Cuba, to Angela Vega-Gonzalez and Rodolfo Gómez-Oramas. She attended the Colorado Women's College, between 1972 and 1973. Subsequently, she attended the University of Houston, where she earned her B.A. in 1976, M.A. in 1979, and PhD. in 1995. Her dissertation was titled "The Journey Home: Caribbean Women Writers Face the Wreckage of History." Gómez-Vega began teaching college courses as a graduate student at the University of Houston in 1978. Since 1995, she has taught at Northern Illinois University in DeKalb, where she is an associate professor of English. She teaches Twentieth-Century American Literature, Ethnic Literature, American Drama, Gay and Lesbian Literature.

In addition to her creative writing, Gómez-Vega has contributed numerous articles, reviews, and essays to such publications as Intertexts, Voces: Journal of Chicana / Latina Studies, Journal of Political and Military Sociology, The Americas Review, MMLA: The Journal of the Midwest Modern Language Association, Crítica Hispánica, The Southern Quarterly, Alif: Journal of Comparative Poetics, and American Drama. She continues to write and perform readings from her works.

== Publications ==
=== Novels ===
- Send My Roots Rain. San Francisco: Aunt Lute Press, 1991.

=== Short stories ===
- "La Tortillera." The Bilingual Review 25.3 (2000): 306–314.
- "Other People's Memories." VOCES: A Journal of Chicana/Latina Studies 3.1&2 (2001): 254–271. Refereed.
- "Telling Ribbons." VOCES: A Journal of Chicana/Latina Studies 3.1&2 (2001): 272–292.
- "Telling Ribbons." The Harrington Lesbian Fiction Quarterly 1.1 (1999): 41–61.
- "Unnatural Acts." VOCES: A Journal of Chicana/Latina Studies 2.1 (1998): 23–41.

=== Plays ===
- Raise a Crow, given a staged reading by Theater Rhinoceros in San Francisco in 1985 and by At the Foot of the Mountain in Minneapolis in 1984.
