= Luise F. Pusch =

German linguist

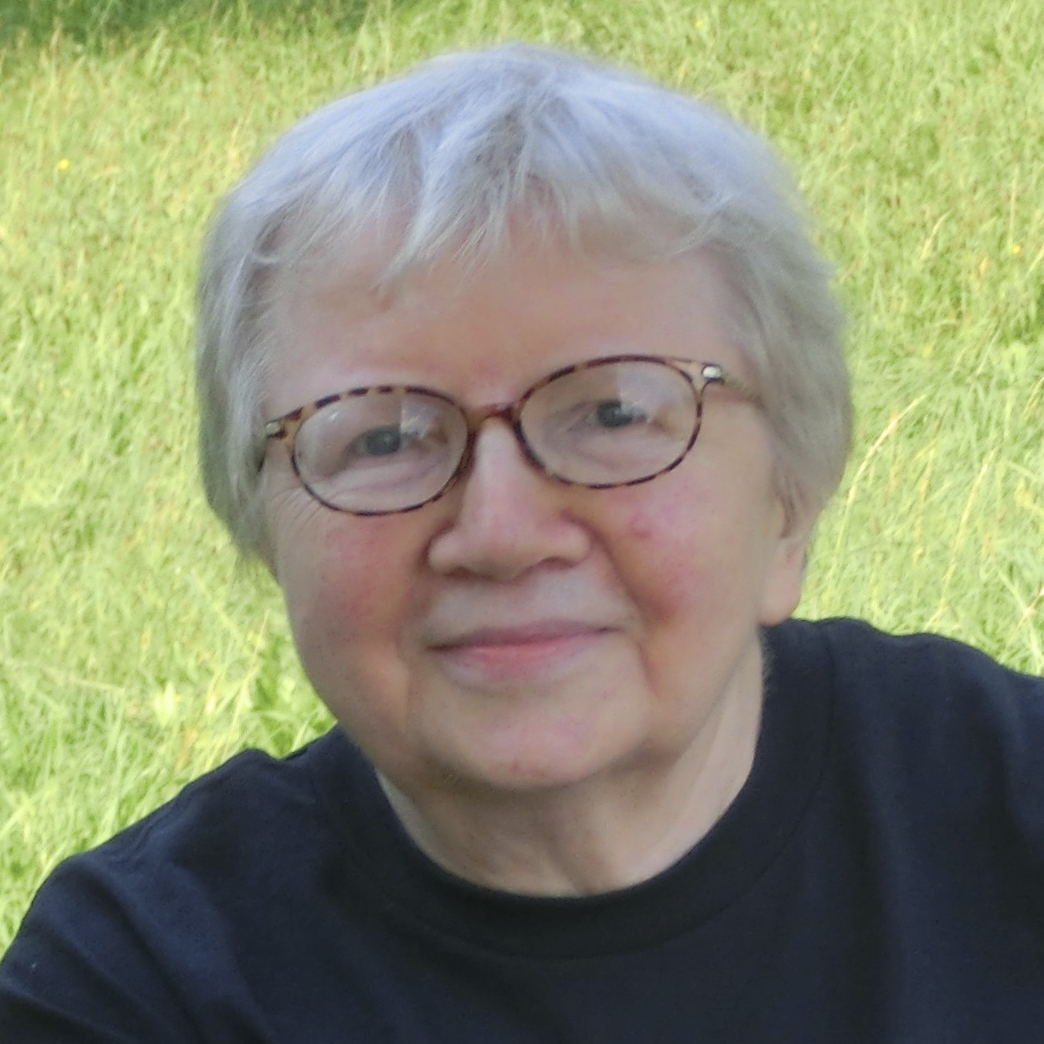
- Luise F. Pusch in September 2013
- Born: 4 January 1944 (age 82); Gütersloh
- Occupation: Linguist
- Years active: 1970s-
- Known for: co-founder of German feminist linguistics

Luise F. Pusch (born 14 January 1944 in Gütersloh, Germany) is a German linguist. She is regarded as the co-founder of feminist linguistics in Germany, along with Senta Trömel-Plötz.

== Life and education ==
Luise Pusch studied English, Latin and linguistics at the University of Hamburg. In 1972 she received her doctorate in English. In 1978, she qualified for the linguistics faculty at the University of Konstanz. From 1979 to 1984 she was a Heisenberg Fellow in the field of feminist linguistic research. Before feminist linguistics became her specialty, she worked on syntactic issues such as construction of gerunds. From 1982 to 1985 she held professorships in English and German in Leibniz University Hannover and in the University of Duisburg-Essen. In 1985, she was named adjunct professor at the University of Konstanz. In 1990-1991, she was professor for women's studies at the University of Münster. Since 1986, Pusch has been partnered with U.S. Germanist Joey Horsley from Boston, and splits her time between there and Hannover.

== Career ==
In the mid-1970s, U.S. feminists such as Robin Lakoff and others had begun to pay attention to the gender discrimination inherent in the language itself, and the way it was used. Feminist linguistics didn't originally develop out of the academic linguistic discipline, but from theoreticians within oppressed groups. From those beginnings, it was brought into the field of linguistics by two professors of linguistics, Senta Trömel-Plötz and Pusch who started the program of Feminist linguistics at the University of Konstanz. The first essays to appear in Germany about the topic were in 1979 in the journal Osnabrücker Beiträge zur Sprachtheorie, and in 1980 in Linguistische Berichte.

Since the 1970s Pusch has been committed to a gender-appropriate language, for example in essays, commentary, discussions, lectures and workshops.

In 1976 she started to write the autobiographical novel Sonja about her relationship to a suicidal partner. After finishing it in 1979 it got published in 1980 under the pseudonym Judith Offenbach and turned out to be a significant influence to the German-language lesbian movement of the time.

In her 1980 essay, "German as Men's Language: Diagnosis and Therapy Ideas" (Das Deutsche als Männersprache. Diagnose und Therapievorschläge), she wrote that standard German has a built-in bias favoring males, that this is problematic, and that the simplest solution to the problem lies in partial de-genderization of the language. To that end, the feminine suffixes -in and -innen could be done away with and (contrary to the existing usage of the language) the male article (der / ein) of the noun would be replaced by the female version (die / eine); female professors would become, simply, "die Professor" (instead of Professorin) or "eine Schriftsteller" (writer) instead of Schriftstellerin.

Due to the expected non-acceptance of such a proposal, she pleaded for the stepped up use of Binnen-I (e.g., SchülerIn (schoolchild) ) in order to avoid use of the paired-word form, Schülerinnen und Schüler (schoolgirls and schoolboys). Besides her linguistic work, she built a biographical database containing the biographies of 30,000 women.

== Awards ==
The association BücherFrauen, a network of women in the book industry, chose Luise F. Pusch as "BookWoman of the Year" 2004. On her 70th Birthday, Pusch was honored with the commemorative Sprachwandlerin award. The Darmstadt-based Luise Büchner Society awarded Pusch their 5th Luise Büchner Prize for Media studies in November 2016. In 2025, she received a version of the Order of Merit of the Federal Republic of Germany.

== Publications ==
- as publisher: ——— (1983). Feminismus: Inspektion der Herrenkultur - Ein Handbuch [Feminism: Inspection of Men's Culture - A Handbook]. NF. 1192. (in German). Frankfurt am Main: Suhrkamp. ISBN 3-518-11192-2.
- ——— (1984). Aufsätze und Glossen zur feministischen Linguistik [German as Men's Language: Essays and Commentary on Feminist Linguistics] (in German). Frankfurt am Main: Suhrkamp. ISBN 3-518-11217-1.
- as publisher: ——— (1985). Schwestern berühmter Männer: Zwölf biographische Portraits [Sisters of Famous Men: Twelve biographical Portraits]. TB (in German). Frankfurt am Main: Insel. ISBN 3-458-32496-8.
- as publisher: ——— (1987). Berühmte Frauen: Kalender [Famous Women: Calendar]. Suhrkamp Taschenbücher, 4537 (in German). Vol. Band 1515. Frankfurt am Main: Suhrkamp. ISBN 3-518-38015-X. ISSN 0930-9721.
- as publisher: ——— (1988). Töchter berühmter Männer: Neun biographische Portraits [Daughters of Famous Men: Nine biographical portraits]. TB 979 (in German). Frankfurt am Main: Insel. ISBN 3-458-32679-0.
- ——— (1990). Alle Menschen werden Schwestern: feministische Sprachkritik [All the People Become Sisters: Feminist Linguistics.] (in German). Frankfurt am Main: Suhrkamp. ISBN 3-518-11565-0.
- as publisher, with Sibylle Duda: ——— (1992). WahnsinnsFrauen [Insane Women]. TB 1876 (in German). Frankfurt am Main: Suhrkamp. ISBN 3-518-38376-0.
- ——— (1993a). Ladies first: ein Gespräch über Feminismus Sprache und Sexualität [Ladies First: A Conversation About Feminism, Language and Sexuality] (in German). Bamberg: Palette. ISBN 3-928062-07-7.
- ——— (1993b). Ladies first: Ein Gespräch über Feminismus, Sprache und Sexualität [Ladies First: A Conversation About Feminism, Language and Sexuality] (in German). Bamberg: Palette. ISBN 3-928062-07-7.
- as publisher: ——— (1994). Mütter berühmter Männer: Zwölf biographische Portraits [Mothers of Famous Men: Twelve Biographical Portraits]. TB 1356 (in German). Frankfurt am Main: Insel. ISBN 3-458-33056-9.
- as publisher, with Sibylle Duda: ——— (1995). WahnsinnsFrauen. Zweiter Band [Insane Women. Vol. 2]. TB (in German). Frankfurt am Main: Suhrkamp. ISBN 3-518-38993-9.
- as publisher, with Sibylle Duda: ——— (1999b). Wahnsinns Frauen. Dritter Band [Insane Women. Vol. 3]. TB (in German). Frankfurt am Main: Suhrkamp. ISBN 3-518-39334-0.
- with Susanne Gretter (pub.): ——— (1999c). Berühmte Frauen: 300 Portraits [Famous Women: 300 Portraits] (in German). Frankfurt am Main: Insel. ISBN 3-458-16949-0.
- with Susanne Gretter (pub.): ——— (2001). Berühmte Frauen 2: 300 Portraits [Famous Women 2: 300 Portraits] (in German). Frankfurt am Main: Insel. ISBN 3-458-17067-7.
- ——— (2008). Die Eier des Staatsoberhaupts und andere Glossen [The Head of State's Eggs, and Other Writings] (in German). Göttingen: Wallstein. ISBN 978-3-8353-0280-8.
- ——— (2009). Der Kaiser sagt Ja: und andere Glossen [The Kaiser says, 'Yes': and Other Writings] (in German). Göttingen: Wallstein. ISBN 978-3-8353-0455-0.
- with Joey Horsley: ——— (2010). Frauengeschichten. Berühmte Frauen und ihre Freundinnen [Women's Stories: Famous Women and Their Women Friends] (in German). Göttingen: Wallstein. ISBN 978-3-8353-0634-9.
- ——— (2011). Deutsch auf Vorderfrau. Sprachkritische Glossen [Female-First German: Linguistic Commentary] (in German). Göttingen: Wallstein. ISBN 978-3-8353-0863-3.
- ——— (2013). Die dominante Kuh. Neue Glossen [The dominant cow. New Writings] (in German). Göttingen: Wallstein. ISBN 978-3-8353-1223-4.
- ——— (2014). Gerecht und Geschlecht: neue sprachkritische Glossen [Right and Gender: New Linguistic Writings] (in German). Göttingen: Wallstein. ISBN 978-3-8353-1428-3.
- Offenbach, Judith (1981). Sonja: eine Melancholie für Fortgeschrittene [Sonja: Melancholia for Intermediates] (in German). Frankfurt am Main: Suhrkamp. ISBN 3-518-37188-6.

== See also ==
- Feminist language reform
- Gender-neutral language
- Gender-neutral pronoun
- Gender neutrality in languages with grammatical gender
- Gender role in language
- German orthography
- German nouns
- Grammatical gender in German
- Language and gender
- Language and thought
- Lavender linguistics
- Sapir-Whorf hypothesis
- Women's studies

== Works cited ==
- "Mit Wissen und Witz im Einsatz für die Frau" [With Wisdom and Wit in Service to Women]. Allgemeine Zeitung (in German). Mainz: VRM. 28 November 2016.
- Luise F. Pusch; list of contributors at fembio.org. "FemBio Frauen Biographieforschung" [Women's Biographical Research].
- Louis, Chantal (13 January 2014). "Luise Pusch: Die Frauensprachlerin" [Luise Pusch: The Female Linguist]. Emma (in German). Cologne: Emma Frauenverlags.
- ——— (1978). Kontrastive Untersuchungen zum italienischen gerundio: Instrumental- und Modalsätze und das Problem der Individuierung von Ereignissen [Contrastive Analysis of Italian Gerunds: Instrumental and Modal Sentences and the Problem of the Individuation of Events] (post-doctoral thesis at the University of Konstanz) (in German). Tübingen: Niemeyer. ISBN 3-484-10321-3.
- ——— (1999a). Die Frau ist nicht der Rede wert: Aufsätze, Reden und Glossen [The Woman Is Not Worth Mentioning: Essays, Speeches and Commentary]] (in German). Frankfurt am Main: Suhrkamp. ISBN 3-518-39421-5.
- Pusch, Luise F. (6 June 2015). "Vita" [Curriculum Vitae]. luisepusch.de (in German). Archived from the original on 15 March 2008.
- Stötzel, Georg; Wengeler, Martin; Böke, Karin (1995). Kontroverse Begriffe: Geschichte des öffentlichen Sprachgebrauchs in der Bundesrepublik Deutschland (in German). Vol. 4. Berlin: Walter de Gruyter. ISBN 978-3-11-014106-1. OCLC 802718544.
- von Bönninghausen, Inge; Pusch, Luise F. (2014). Die Sprachwandlerin - Luise F. Pusch Zurufe und Einwürfe von Freundinnen und Weggefährtinnen; [eine Femmage zum 70. Geburtstag von Luise F. Pusch] [The Language Translator - Luise F. Pusch. Calls and suggestions from girlfriends and companions; [A femmage for the 70th birthday of Luise F. Pusch]] (in German). Göttingen: Wallstein. ISBN 978-3-8353-1427-6. OCLC 873424441.
