= Senta Trömel-Plötz =

- Born: February 26, 1939 (age 87); Munich, Germany
- Citizenship: German, American
- Education: University of Pennsylvania
- Movement: Feminism
- Children: 3

Senta Trömel-Plötz (born February 26, 1939, in Munich) is a German linguist. Together with Luise F. Pusch she introduced feminist linguistics in Germany.

== Life ==
Trömel-Plötz studied linguistics in the USA. She received her doctorate from the University of Pennsylvania with the dissertation, Simple Copula Structures in English. This was followed by her habilitation. From 1980 to 1984 she was a professor in the Linguistics Department at the University of Konstanz. The professorship was not converted into a permanent position. Trömel-Plötz believes that anti-feminist beliefs at the time prevented her being given tenure. She then chose to move to the USA for better opportunities at Universities. Since then she has worked as a freelance linguist, author, and professor. She has published numerous publications in the fields of formal linguistics, psycholinguistics, and feminist linguistics.

Trömel-Plötz now lives in Lancaster, Pennsylvania.

== Work ==
Her sociolinguistic text Linguistik und Frauensprache (Linguistics and Women's Language), which was published for the first time in 1978 in the journal Linguistische Berichte, broke new ground for feminist linguistics in German-speaking countries. This essay proposed "a problematic conflation of grammatical and biological gender" for the first time. Trömel-Plötz "initiated the debate about the supposedly gender-neutral generic masculine and criticized the fact that this form does not seem gender-neutral but conceptually erases women."

=== Published works ===
- Frauensprache in unserer Welt der Männer (1979) ISBN 3-8794-0162-4
