= Anna Elisabet Weirauch =

German author and lesbian activist; known for, The Scorpion'

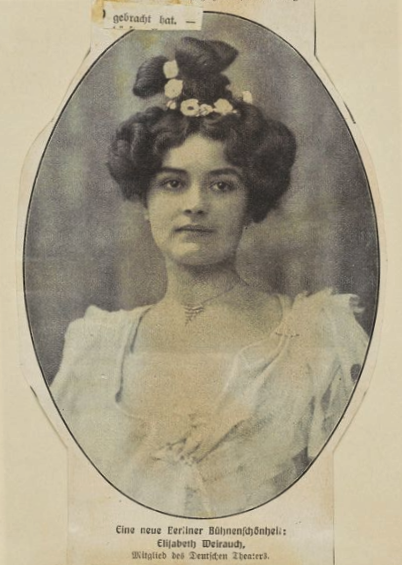
- Born: 7 August 1887; Galați, Kingdom of Romania
- Died: 21 December 1970 (aged 83); West Berlin, West Germany
- Occupations: Author, Actor
- Partner: Helena Geisenhainer

Anna Elisabet Weirauch (August 7, 1887 – December 21, 1970) was a German author. Weirauch was an important figure for lesbians in Germany in the early 1900s, as well as for lesbians in the 1970s-1980s following an English translation. Her most well-known work is Der Skorpion, which was a significant piece of lesbian literature which broke from traditional peers in the genre.

== Personal life ==
Anna Elisabet Weirauch was born in Galați, Romania on August 7, 1887. Both of Anna's parents were Berlin writers, and her father was also the founder of the Romanian State Bank. She was the youngest of four children. Anna lived in Romania until her father's death in 1891. Then, she moved to Germany with her mother, first to Thuringia and then to Berlin in 1893. She then enrolled in Höhere Töchterschule where she was trained in acting and singing.

From 1906 until 1914, Weirauch was a member of Max Reinhardt’s prestigious acting company at Germany's State Theatre (Deutsche Theater). There, she discovered her love for writing. Some of her first literary experiments were playwriting dramas, and some of her early plays were even performed as matinees at the Germany State Theatre.

In the mid-1920s, Weirauch entered a lifelong relationship with a Dutch woman, Helena Geisenhainer. In the 1930s, the start of the Nazi era, the two moved to Gastag in Bavaria. After the war was over, Weirauch and Geisenhainer relocated to Munich, and then in 1961, they lived out their lives together in Berlin, where Weirauch would continue her writing until death.

Weirauch died in Berlin on December 21, 1970.

== Career ==
Weirauch's first novel was published in 1918, titled Die kleine Dagmar, or Little Dagmar.

In 1919, she published Der Tag der Artemis or The Day of Artemis, which was her first work to depict a homoerotic (adolescent) relationship.

Weirauch's most popular work came with her trilogy Der Skorpion (The Scorpion). The first part of the trilogy was published in 1919, the two subsequent parts in 1921 and 1932. Der Skorpion is one of the first German novels to depict lesbian love in a positive way. Der Skorpion portrays lesbianism not as a negative trait or an ill to be cured, but as something innate. Its role in influencing perceptions in Germany was analogous to the role of The Well of Loneliness by Radclyffe Hall in the U.S. Her work was highly influential in America as well, as the first two volumes were translated into English and then condensed into one, under the name The Scorpion, in 1932. Then, the third volume was translated and published with the title The Outcast in 1948. In 1958, the trilogy was reissued under a new, provocative title, Of Love Forbidden.

In 1926, Der Skorpion was censored in Germany on the ground that it could corrupt youth. So, it was not widely distributed, but still was able to garner popularity. This may in part be because the trilogy was published during the Weimar Republic, when Germany was more tolerant of transgressive ideas than it would later be.

In the 1930s, at the start of the Nazi reign, Weirauch had to be a member of the Reich Chamber of Literature within the Reich Culture Chamber, for her work to be published. She was never a member of the Nazi party. During this time, Weirauch wrote twenty-one novels. Her work avoided politics so as to keep herself safe during a time of intense persecution in Germany.

=== The Scorpion (Der Skorpion) ===
==== Plot ====
Melitta Rudloff, known as Mette, (some scholars refer to her as Myra, likely due to translation) is a lesbian raised by a strict, upper-class family from Berlin. The first sign of Mette's sexuality is when she is attracted to her nanny, but that infatuation does not have any outcome. She first pursues a true lesbian relationship with a woman 10 years older than her named Olga, who Mette is attracted to for her knowledge and charm. Their relationship is initially platonic, but takes a turn for the romantic following a passionate evening. Mette's family actively tries to dissuade her from following this path, initially hiring a private detective to shadow them, and possibly convict Olga of "the seduction of minors." They also send Mette to a psychiatrist, in an attempt to steer her away from the lesbian lifestyle. Following the romantic development of their relationship, Mette's family follows through with accusing Olga of the seduction of minors. Olga denies this when confronted at her home by the police and Mette's family, and sends Mette away. Having been already accused of this crime in Austria, which can result in prosecution, Olga commits suicide over pressure from this as well as her treatment of Mette.

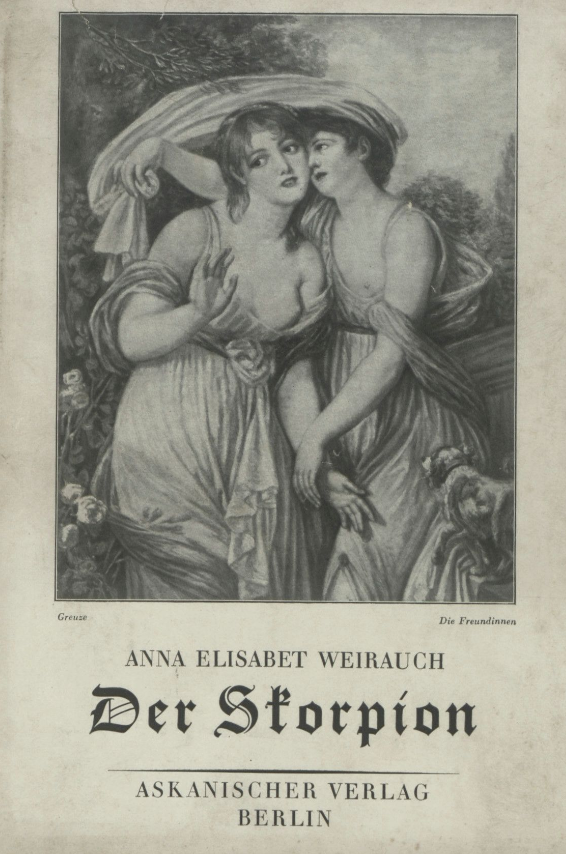
Cover of Der Skorpion.

Mette comes of age at 21, and inherits a sizable fortune from her family. As a result, she breaks off her heterosexual engagement, which she took only to avoid discrimination, and travels to Munich. While there, she meets other homosexual people, and has a romantic affair. However, Mette is dissatisfied without mental stimulation, and leaves yet again, this time to Hamburg. After residing there for some time, Mette decides that she would like to live a rural life, for which she would have to return to Berlin. Once there, she enters a relationship with Cora von Gjellerström, a previous lover of Olga. This relationship is not long-lasting, but allows Mette to come to terms with herself. The series ends with Mette living by herself in the countryside, but at the same time does not exclude the possibility of a future relationship.

==== Terminology ====
A main theme in the novel is the complexity of lesbian identity, and rejection of the fetishization of female sexuality. This is conveyed through the main romance between Mette and Olga, the latter of whom is more masculine in their presentation. Mette is smitten by the older and mysterious Olga, who is a "scorpion". In German, a Skorpion ('scorpion'), is a more masculine-presenting lesbian; scorpions communicate their complex identities through their appearances, such as through masculine haircut or fashion. Scorpions are also more sophisticated, frequently being well-educated in various fields and disciplines.

== Works ==
- Little Dagmar (1918)
- The Day of Artemis (1919)
- Ruth Meyer: Almost an Everyday Story (1922)
- Lotte: A Berlin Novel (1932)
- The Scorpion (1932)
- The Outcast (1933)
- Manuela, the Enigma (1939)
- Mara Holm's Marriage (1949)
