= Cavedweller (film) =

- Directed by: Lisa Cholodenko
- Screenplay by: Anne Meredith
- Based on: Cavedweller by Dorothy Allison
- Produced by: Michael Levine
- Starring: Kyra Sedgwick; Aidan Quinn; Sherilyn Fenn; Kevin Bacon
- Cinematography: Xavier Pérez Grobet
- Edited by: Amy E. Duddleston
- Music by: Wendy Melvoin
- Release date: 2004
- Running time: 101 minutes
- Country: United States
- Language: English

Cavedweller is a 2004 American drama film directed by Lisa Cholodenko, based on the novel of the same name by Dorothy Allison. It stars Kyra Sedgwick and Aidan Quinn. It won the New American Cinema award at the 30th Seattle International Film Festival.

== Plot summary ==
A traumatic event sends musician Delia back to her hometown in an effort to reunite with the two daughters she abandoned. To do so, she must confront her abusive ex-husband, Clint, from whom she fled years ago and who is now all alone and dying of cancer.

Delia ran away after her husband tried to kill her, subsequently joining a rock band and having a daughter, Cissy, with Randall. Following Randall's death in Los Angeles and a ten-year absence, Delia decides to return home to Georgia. She is met with an unforgiving community. Grandma Windsor has raised Amanda—aged 16 and a born-again Christian — and Dede — aged 14 and a free-spirited singer like her mother. Initially, Grandma refuses to let Delia see her children.

Clint wants to die at home, and Delia agrees to be his caretaker on the condition that the two daughters are returned to her custody. Delia, Clint, uprooted daughter Cissy, and her daughters Amanda and Dede all begin living together, with Delia assuring them that this time she will not run away again. Cissy, who grew up in Los Angeles, finds the transition to rural southern Georgia difficult, but she ultimately cares for and bonds with Clint. Amanda wants her mother to become a born-again Christian and find divine forgiveness, while Delia wants her daughter to forgive and love her instead. Meanwhile, Dede — who smokes and has a secret boyfriend—begins to understand why her mother left.

Following Clint's death at home, the family navigates their raw emotions and new relationships as they move forward.

== Cast ==
- Kyra Sedgwick as Delia Byrd
- Aidan Quinn as Clint Windsor
- Sherilyn Fenn as MT
- Kevin Bacon as Randall Pritchard
- Jill Scott as Rosemary
- Vanessa Zima as Amanda Windsor
- April Mullen as Dede
- Regan Arnold as Cissy Pritchard

== Reception ==
Josh Ralske of AllMusic gave Cavedweller 3 stars out of 5, calling it "a potent, absorbing family drama that ends on a note of real emotional power." Matthew Gilbert of The Boston Globe said, "[Kyra] Sedgwick is marvelous, and so are all three of the actresses who play her daughters, particularly Regan Arnold as Cissy."

Meanwhile, David Rooney of Variety said, "screenwriter Anne Meredith's adaptation too often skims the surface of the characters' struggles when it should dig deeper, sacrificing much of the novel's emotional resonance in the distillation, particularly where Cissy is concerned."

Robert Lloyd of Los Angeles Times praised cinematographer Xavier Pérez Grobet's work. He said, "[Grobet] seems to have thumbed through some American photography collections in preparation for this shoot -- I thought of William Eggleston and Stephen Shore -- and does marvelous things with light."
