= Illegitimacy in fiction =

List of fictional stories in which illegitimacy features as an important plot element

This is a list of fictional stories in which illegitimacy features as an important plot element. Passing mentions are omitted from this article. Many of these stories explore the social pain and exclusion felt by illegitimate "natural children".

Illegitimacy was a common theme in Victorian literature. "Illegitimacy was a popular subject for Victorian writers, not only because of its value as a plot device, but also because of the changing laws affecting illegitimate children and their parents which kept the topic in the public eye."

== Written works ==
=== Pre-Victorian ===
Shakespeare

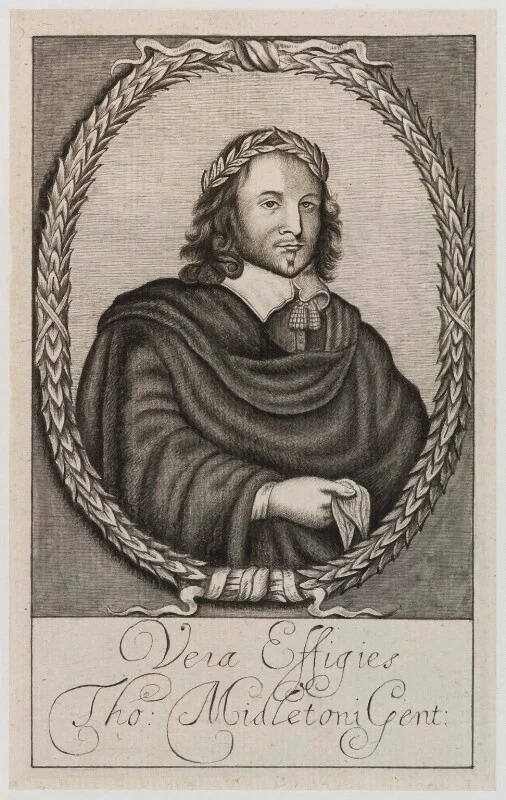
Middleton

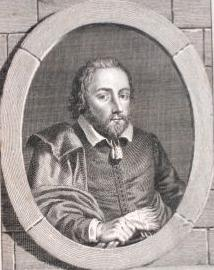
Massinger

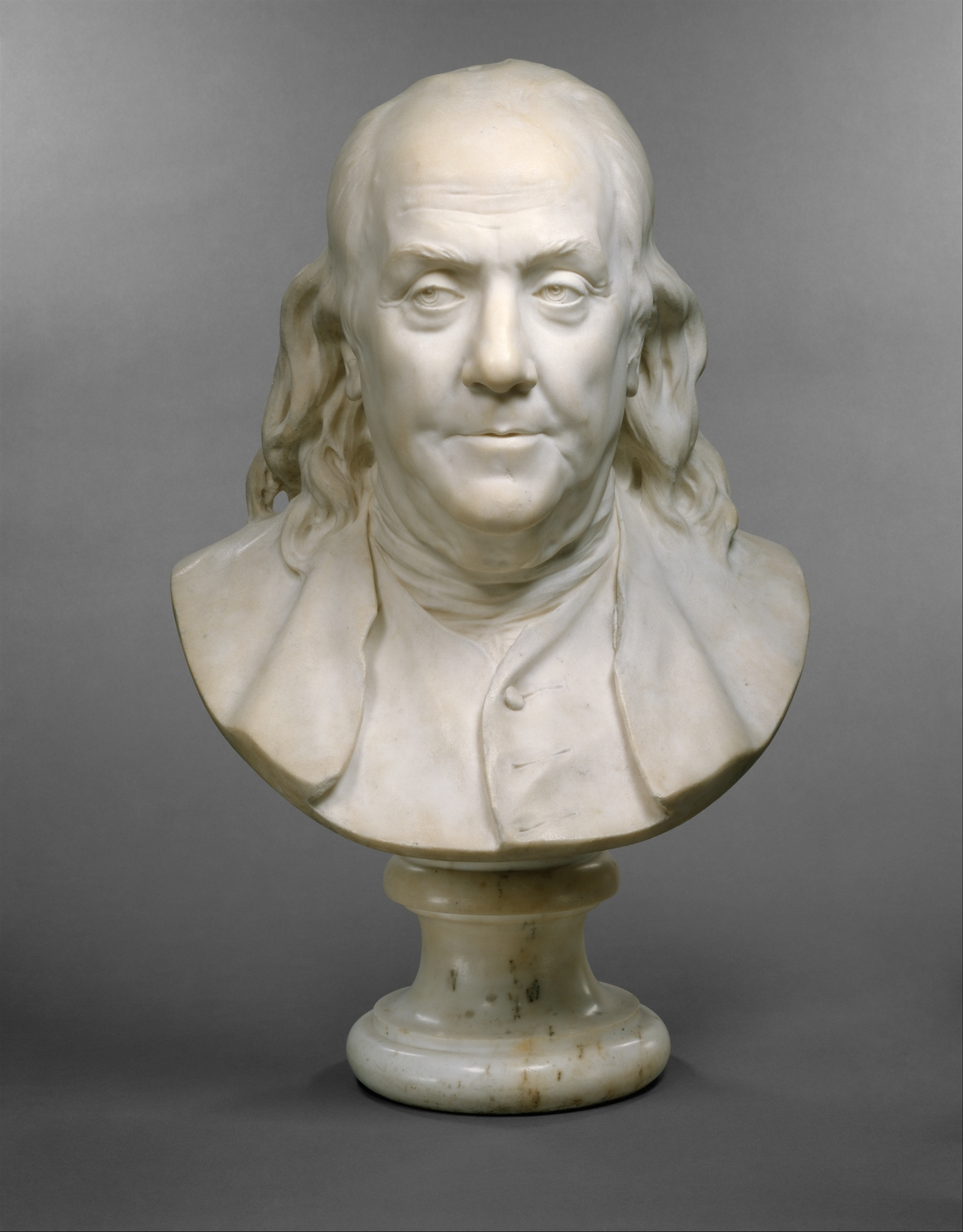
Franklin

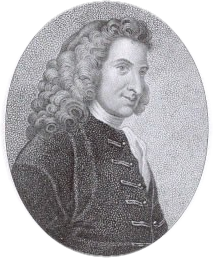
Fielding

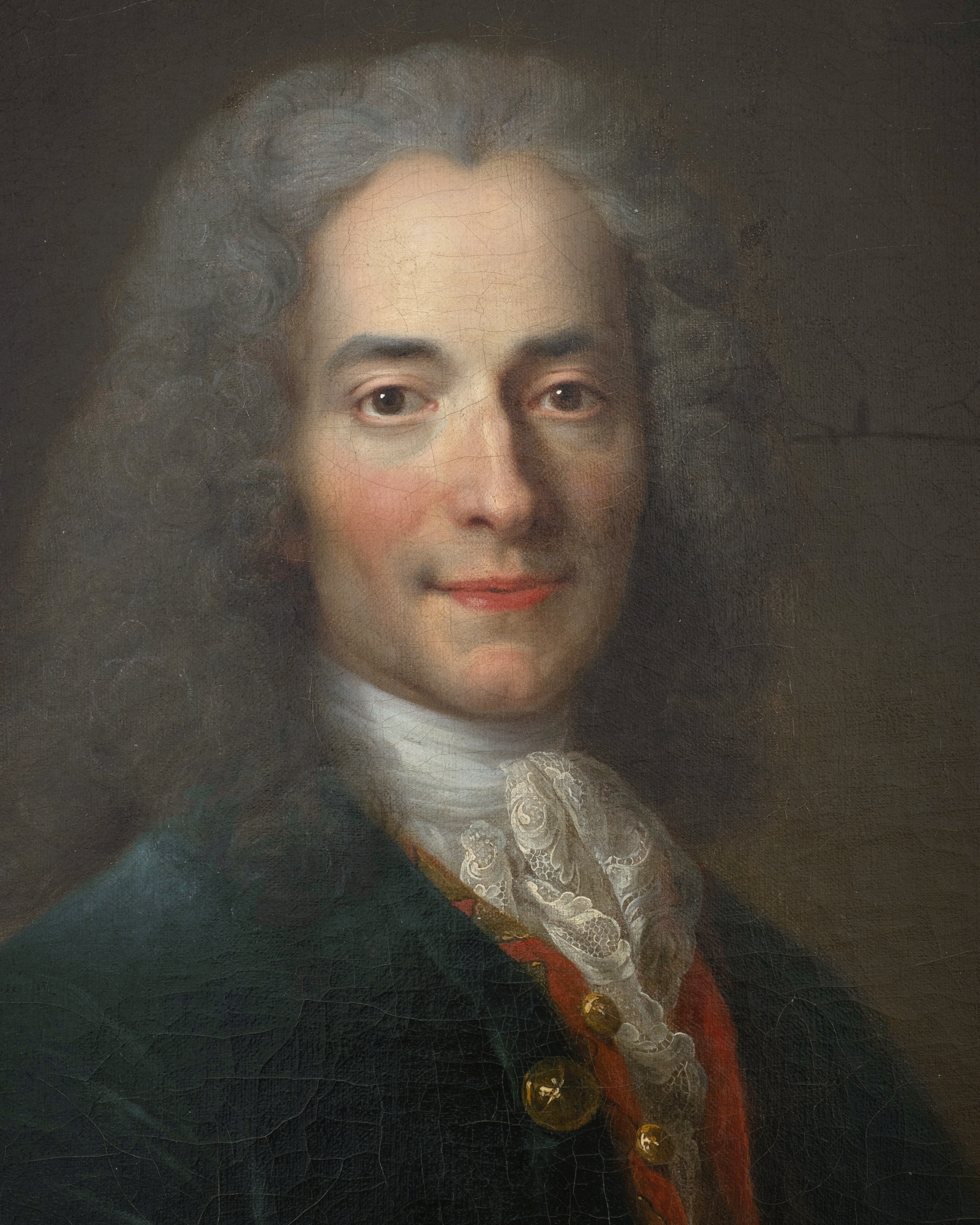
Voltaire

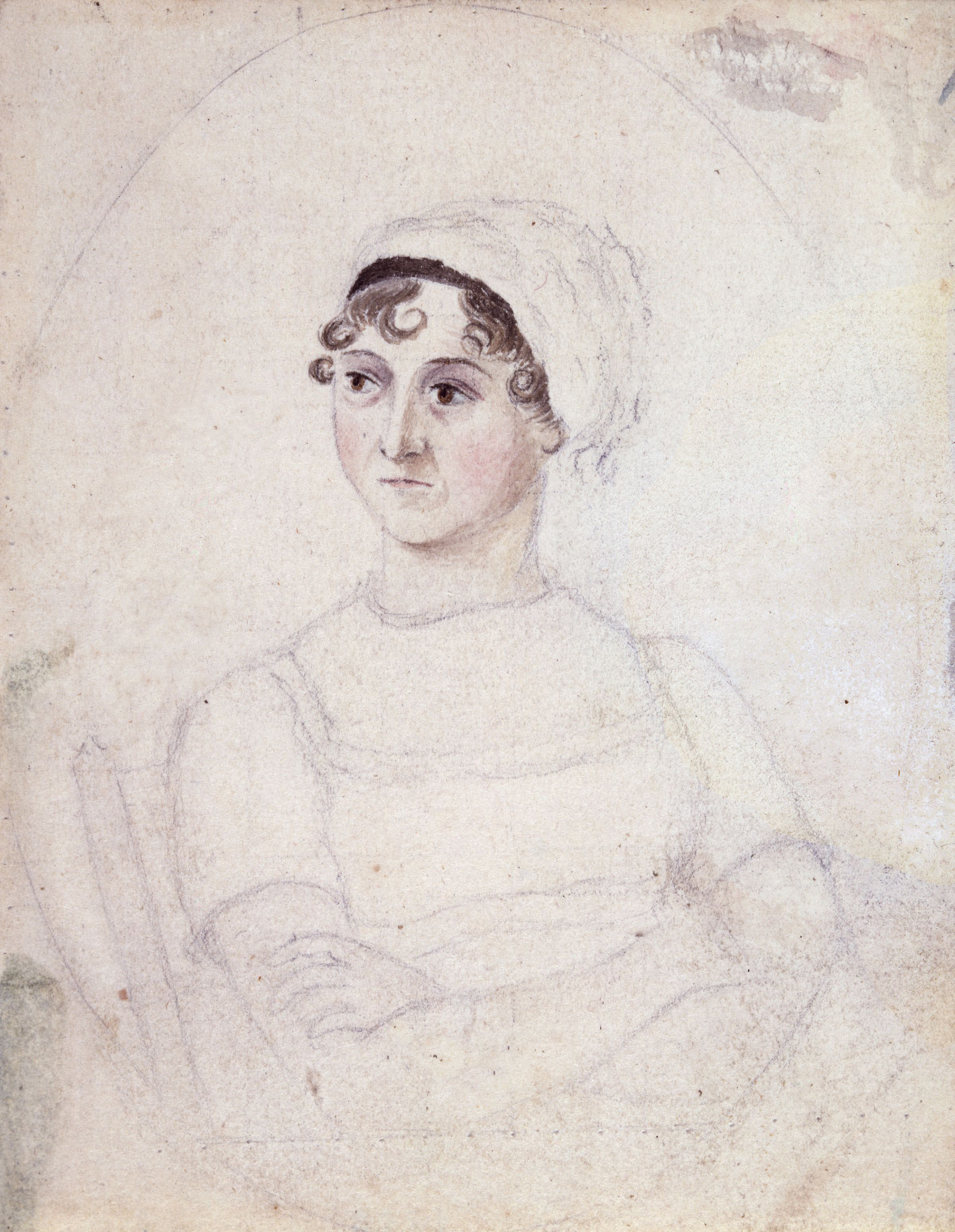
Austen

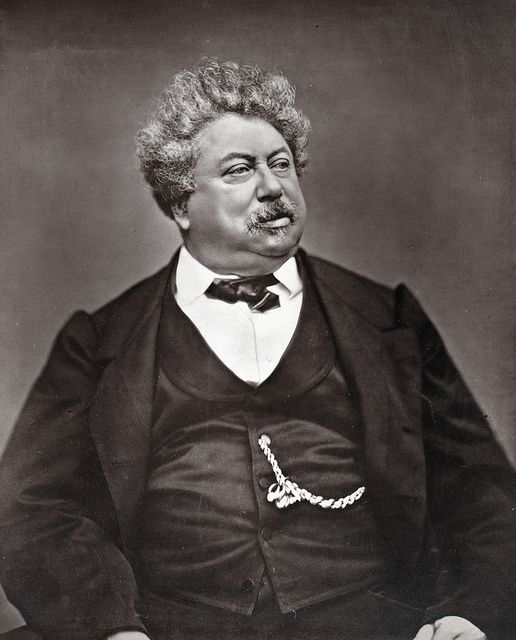
Dumas, père

- Geoffrey of Monmouth, The History of the Kings of Britain (c. 1136 prose history): Much attention is focused on the disputable bastardy of King Arthur, as well as the illegitimate origins of the wizard Merlin.
- Sir Thomas Malory, Le Morte d'Arthur (1485 prose romance): King Arthur is conceived illegitimately when his father Uther Pendragon utilizes Merlin's magic to seduce Igraine, a noblewoman married to Duke Gorlois. Later, Arthur unwittingly begets a bastard son, Mordred, on his own half-sister Morgause. At Arthur's court, Mordred and his half-brother Agravain incite growing discontent about the Queen's adulterous relations with Sir Lancelot, and a civil war ensues. While Arthur is preoccupied fighting Lancelot, Mordred spreads word that Arthur has been killed, seizes the crown for himself, and attempts to seduce the queen. She resists, and Arthur quickly returns, attacking and defeating his son's armies. Mordred dies in combat, and Arthur is fatally wounded and dies shortly thereafter with his kingdom in ruins.
- William Shakespeare:
  - Richard III (1591 play): Richard, Duke of Gloucester, usurps the English throne, justifying the coup by claiming that the young nephew he deposed, King Edward V, and his younger brother, the Duke of York, are both illegitimate, as their father (Edward IV) was promised in marriage to another woman when he wedded their mother.
  - King John (1595? play): Philip Falconbridge, bastard son of Richard the Lionheart, helps save England from ruin at the hands of Richard's incompetent younger brother, John of England.
  - Much Ado About Nothing (1598 play): The envious and melancholy villain of the comedy, Don John, is a bastard, and invents schemes to thwart the marriage of his legitimate brother's close friends.
  - King Lear (1605 play): Edmund, bastard son of the Earl of Gloucester, first cheats his legitimate brother Edgar of his lands, then stands by while his father is declared a traitor, blinded, and sent to wander in the wilderness. Edmund finally makes an attempt on the English crown itself by bedding Lear's two daughters Regan and Goneril.
  - The Tempest (1611 play): Caliban, a savage, deformed slave of the play's protagonist, Prospero, is the offspring of a witch and a sea demon.
- Thomas Middleton, The Revenger's Tragedy (1607 play): In addition to cuckolding his father and plotting against his legitimate brother, the Duke's bastard son, Spurio, also becomes heavily embroiled in the Revenger's plot to undo the Duke and the rest of his family.
- Philip Massinger, The Maid of Honour (1632 play): a king removes his troublesome illegitimate brother from court by sending him off on a secret military campaign.
- Benjamin Franklin, "The Speech of Polly Baker" (1747 story): a woman is put on trial for having an illegitimate child. She had been convicted four times in the past for this same crime. Each time, she said, the full blame was placed on her shoulders but not the father's.
- Henry Fielding, The History of Tom Jones, a Foundling (1749 novel): Tom, the bastard infant of a country girl, is left in an anonymous bundle to the care of the rich and kind-hearted Mr. Allworthy. Mr. Allworthy raises Tom, who grows up and has a number of adventures over the book's thousand-plus pages.
- Voltaire, Candide (1759 satirical novella): The hero Candide, in the opening of chapter 1, is "suspected [to be] the son of the Baron's sister by a respectable, honest gentleman of the neighborhood, whom she had refused to marry because he could prove only seventy-one quarterings, the rest of his family tree having been lost in the passage of time."
- Jane Austen:
  - Sense and Sensibility (1811 novel): Colonel Brandon's ward Miss Williams is suspected to be his illegitimate daughter but it is revealed that she in fact the illegitimate daughter of his first love Eliza, who had been forced to marry his brother and was later divorced by her husband for infidelity. She leaves her daughter, also Eliza, to his care. On a visit to Bath, she is seduced by Willoughby who has abandoned her prior to his meeting Marianne. She in turn gives birth to an illegitimate child. When Willoughby's aunt discovers the affair, she disowns him, leading him to forsake Marianne whom he truly loves and marry an heiress for her fortune.
  - Emma (1815 novel): Harriet Smith, a young woman who attends a local school, is described as the "natural daughter of somebody" ("natural" in this sense meaning illegitimate). She is befriended by Emma Woodhouse, who imagines that Harriet is the child of a wealthy gentleman and introduces her to the local vicar, Mr. Elton, who she thinks is a good match. Elton, however, sees Harriet as far below him socially, and instead woos the unsuspecting Emma. It is revealed later in the novel that Harriet is the child of a prosperous tradesman.
- Alexandre Dumas, père (who fathered several illegitimate children, including Alexandre Dumas, fils), Antony (1831 play): a defense of adultery and illegitimacy.

=== Victorian ===
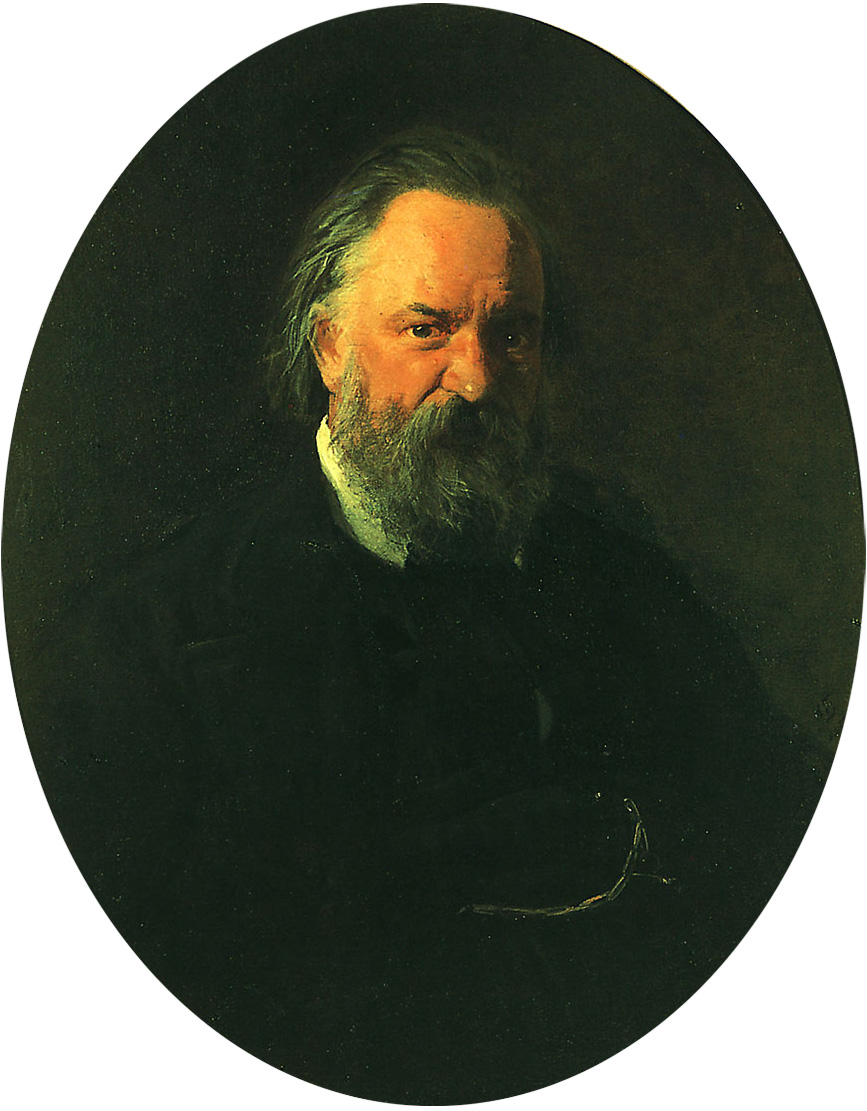
Herzen

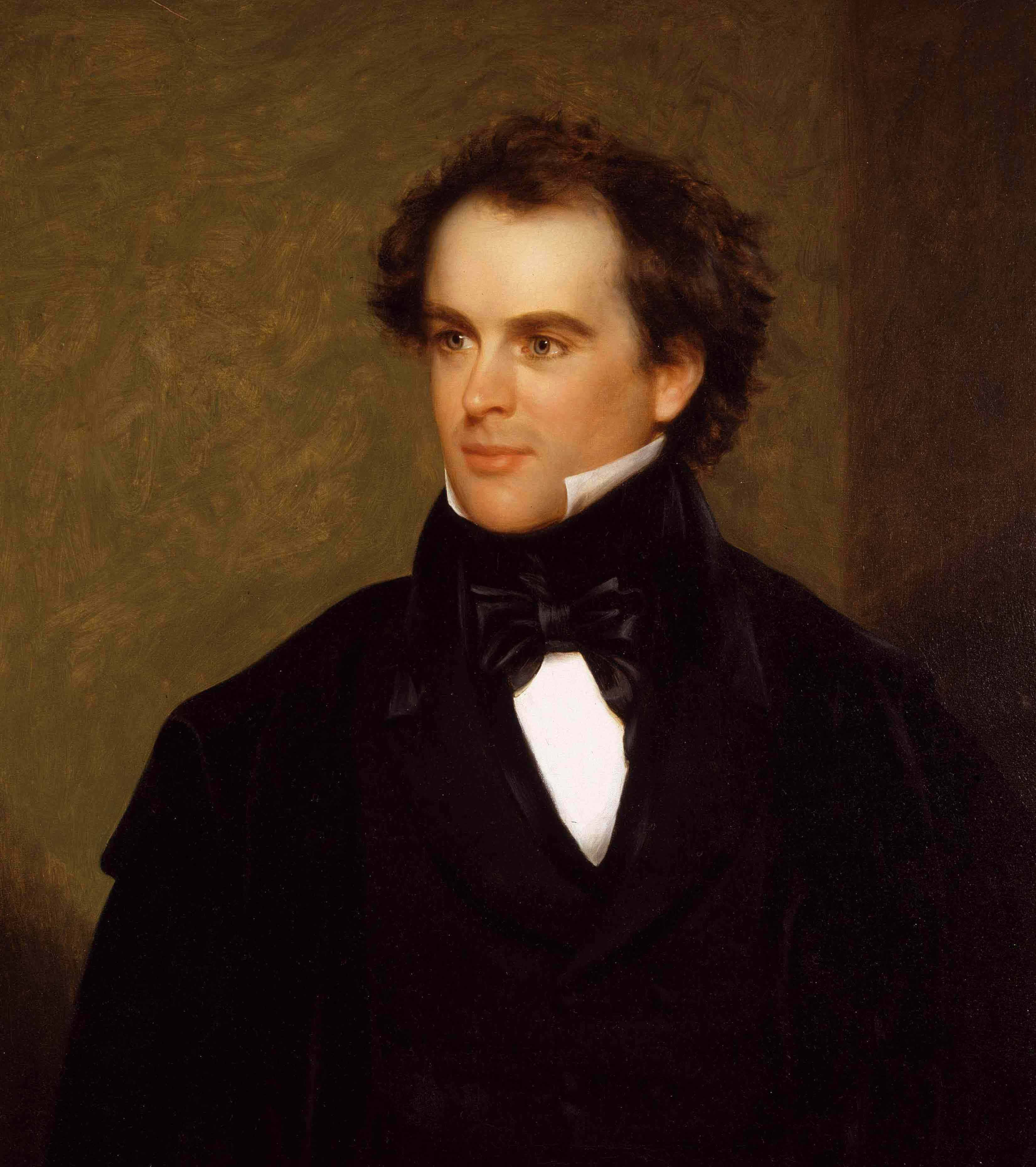
Hawthorne

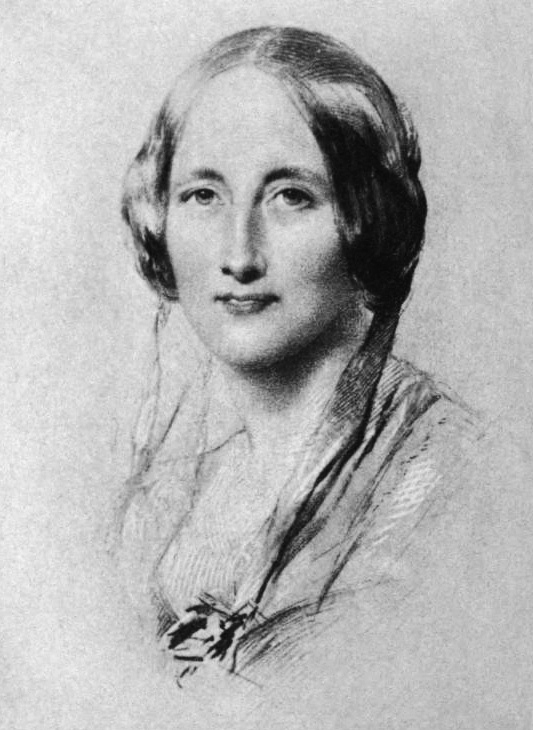
Gaskell

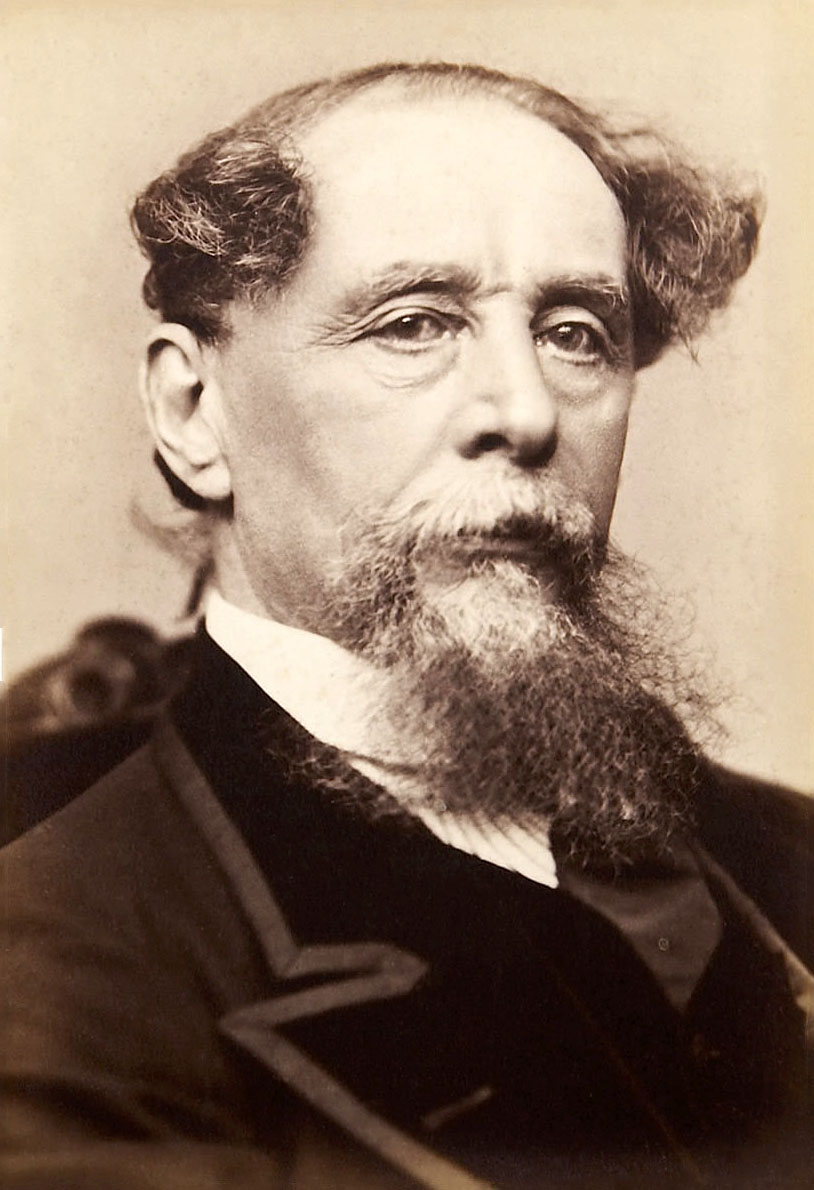
Dickens

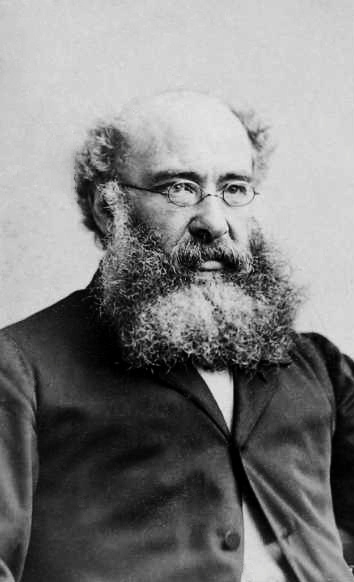
Trollope

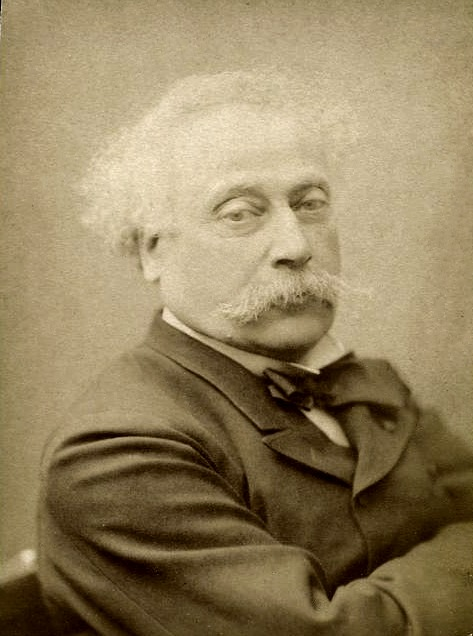
Dumas, fils

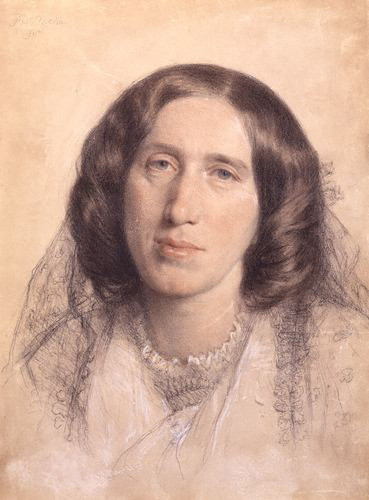
Eliot

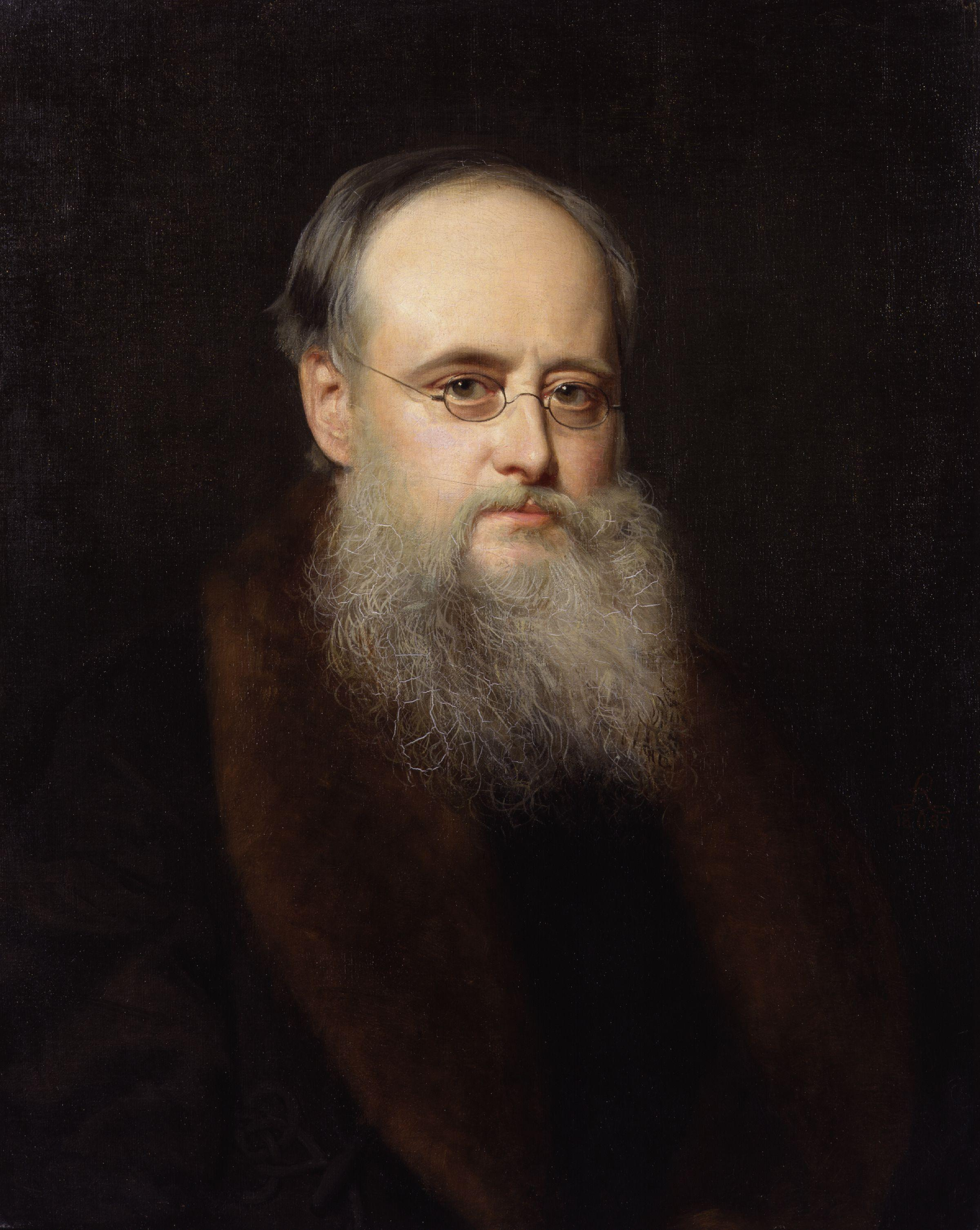
Collins

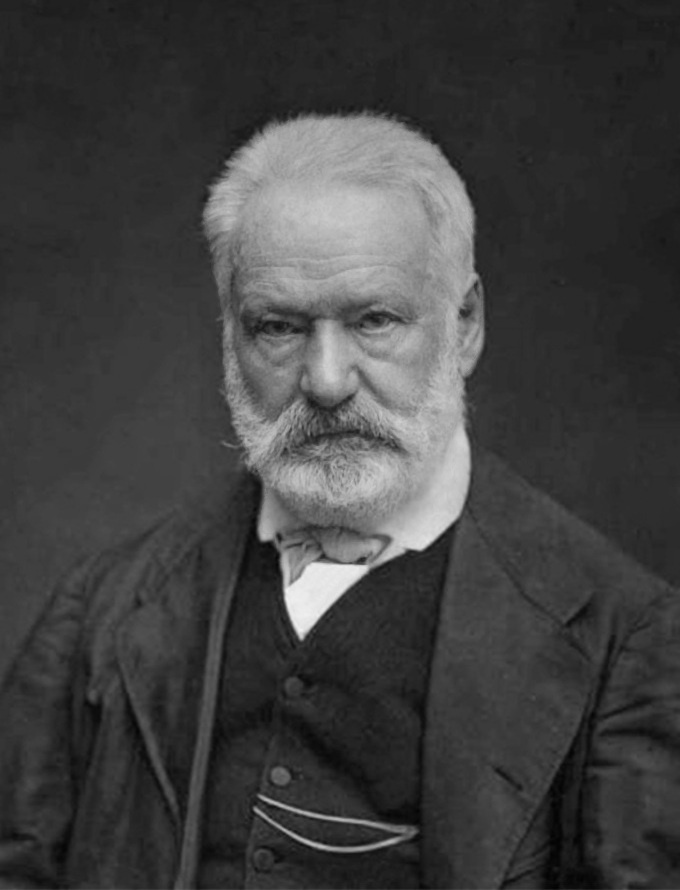
Hugo

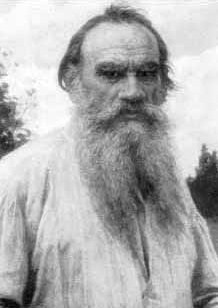
Tolstoy

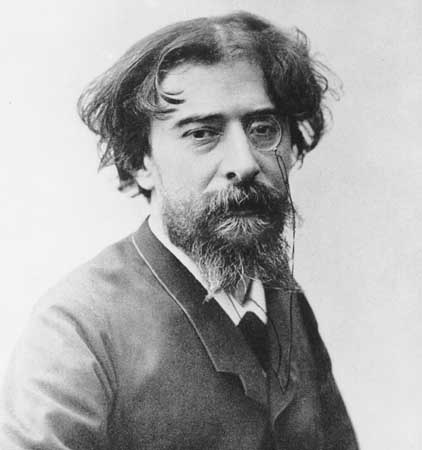
Daudet

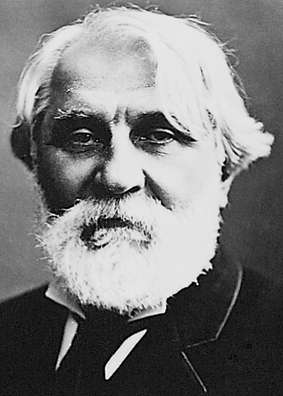
Turgenev

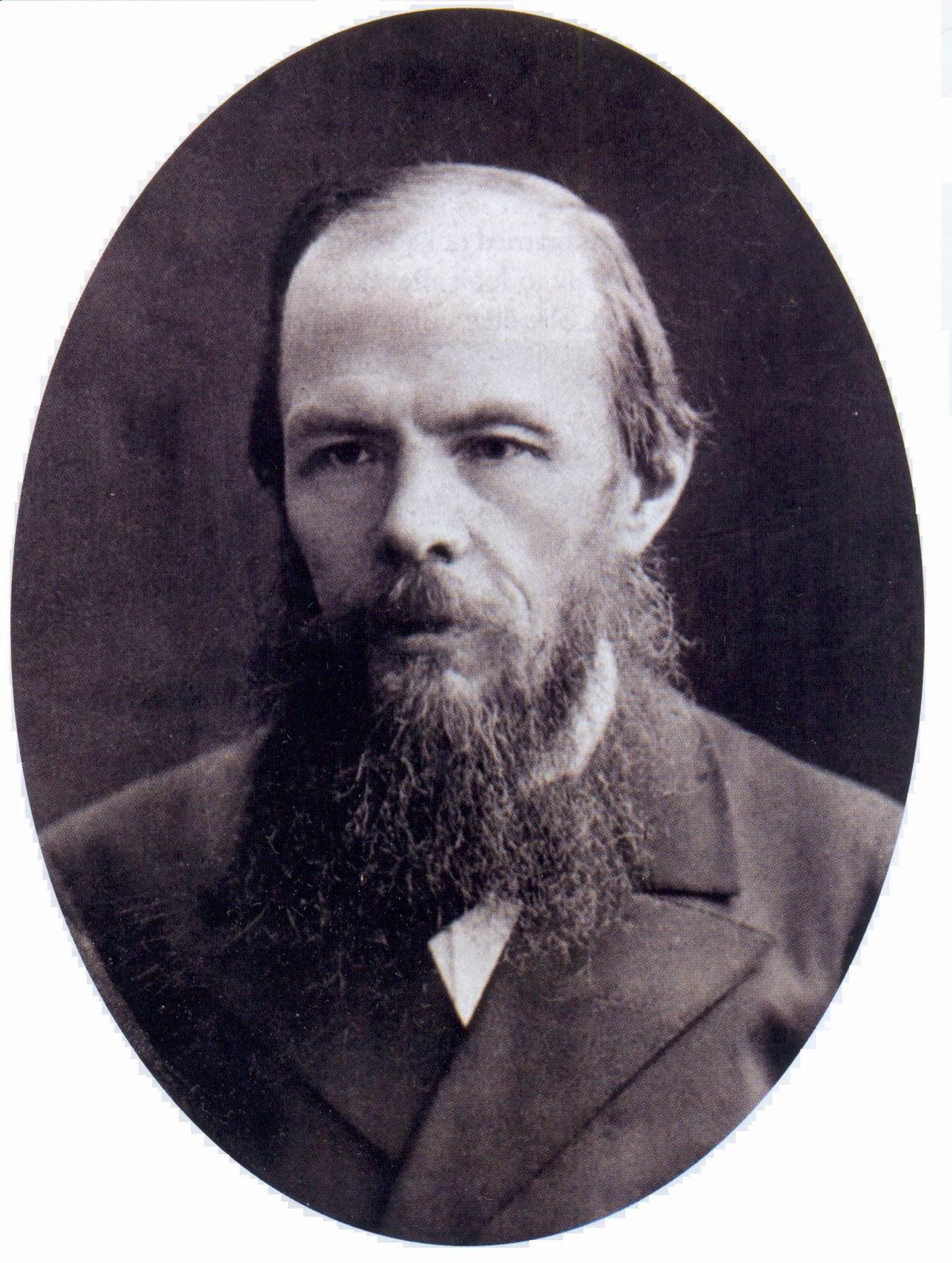
Dostoyevsky

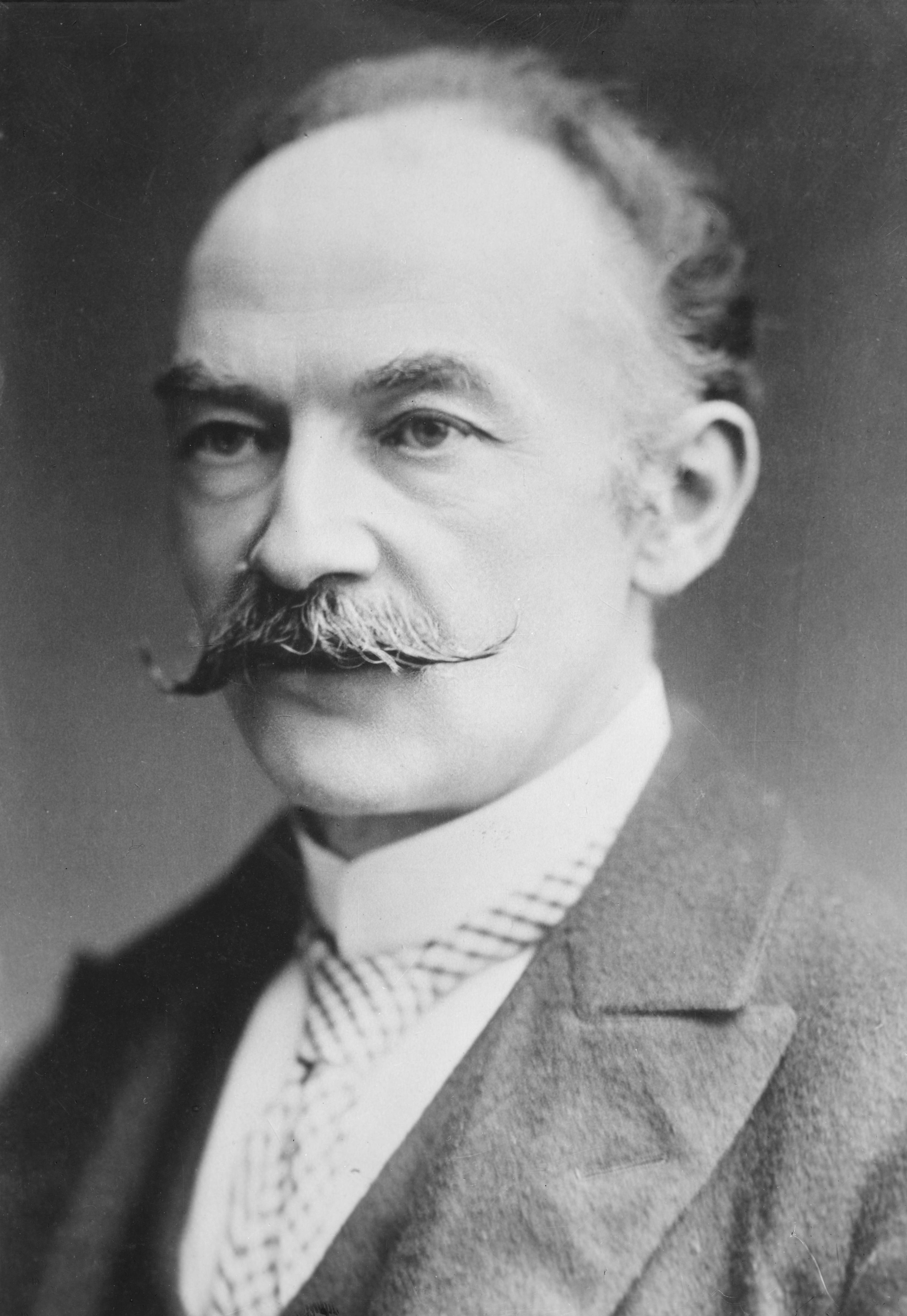
Hardy

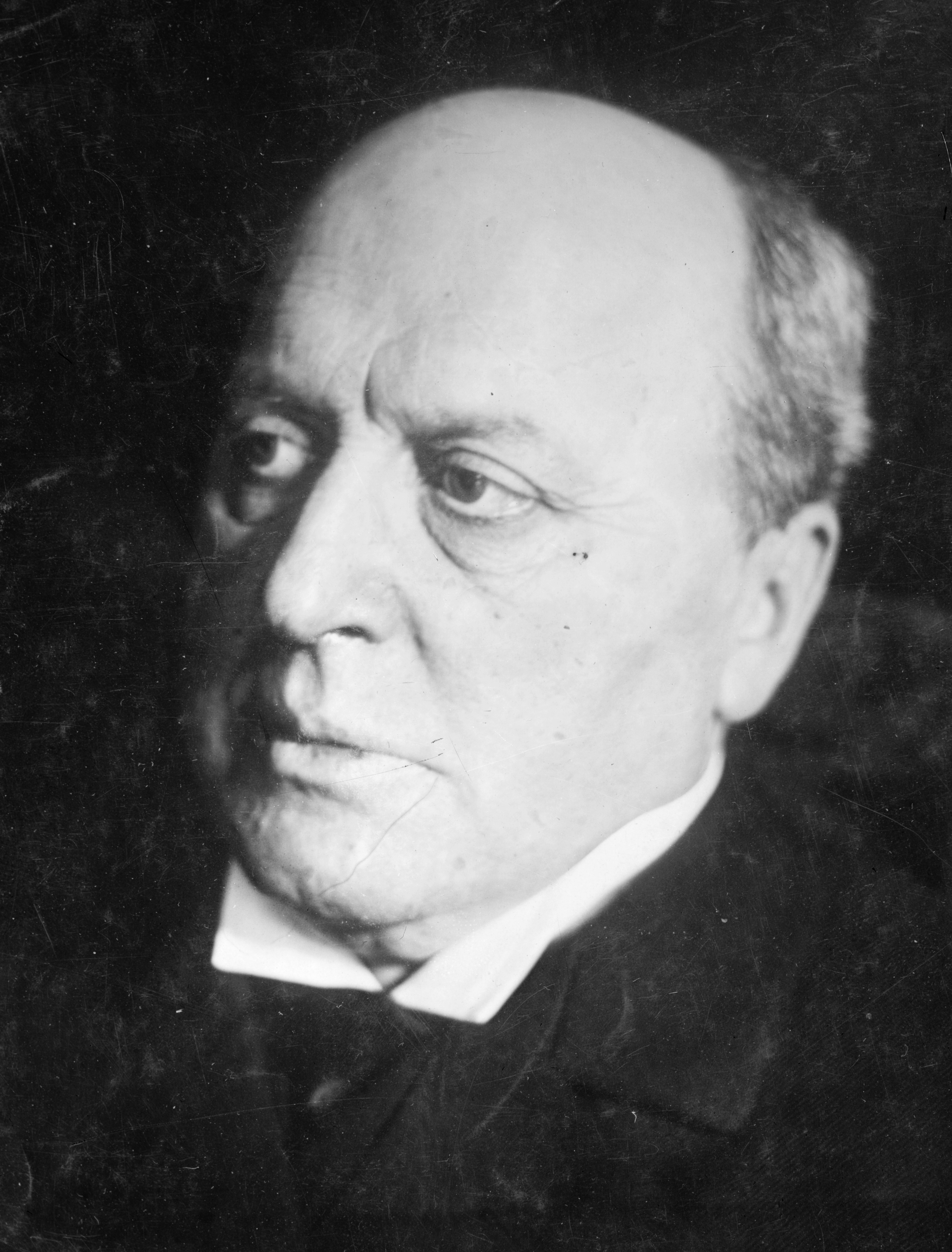
James

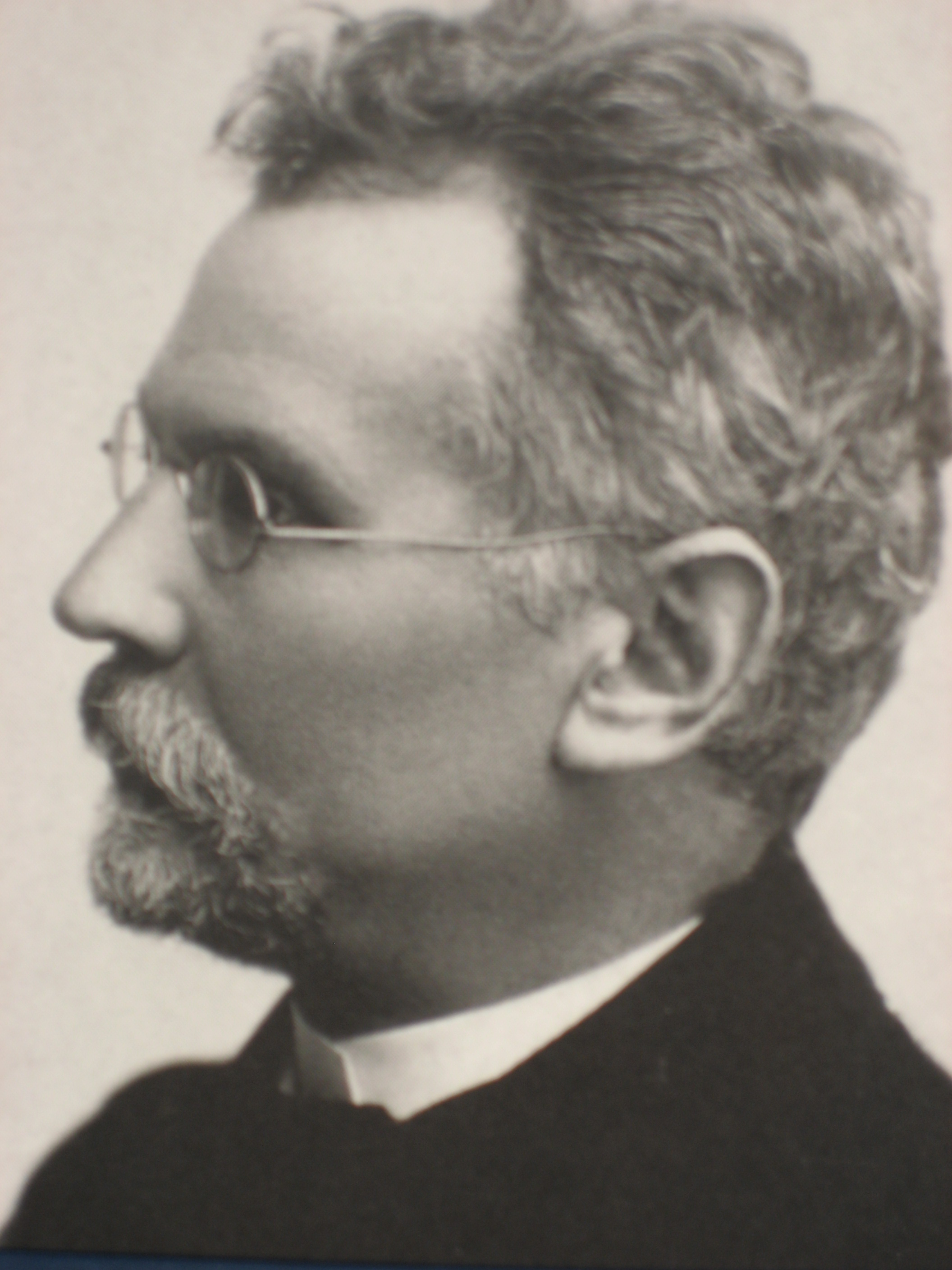
Prus

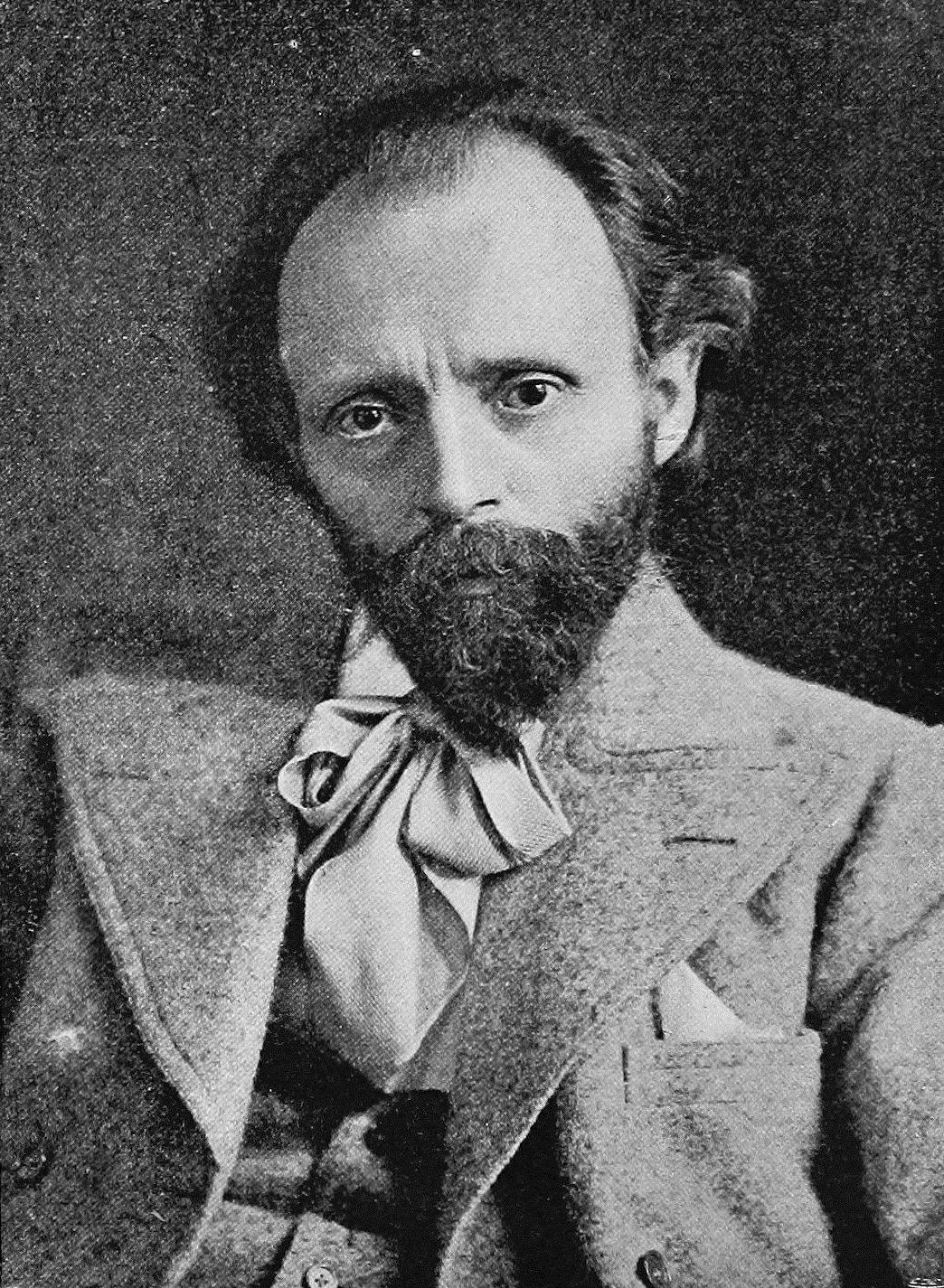
Caine

- Charles Dickens: nearly half of his 14 finished novels include illegitimate individuals:
  - Oliver Twist (Oliver), 1839;
  - Barnaby Rudge (Hugh the Ostler), 1841;
  - Dombey and Son (Alice Brown), 1848;
  - Bleak House (1853 social novel): illegitimacy (heroine Esther Summerson's) is one of the social questions addressed, making Esther the novel's moral heart despite her illegitimacy.
  - Little Dorrit (Arthur Clennam), 1857;
  - Great Expectations (Estella), 1861.
- Alexander Herzen, Who is to Blame? (1847 novel): Krutsifersky is the tutor of Lyubonka, an illegitimate daughter of the retired general, Negrov. Upon forming an emotional attachment to Lyubonka, Krutsifersky is allowed to marry her. The emphasis given to Lyubonka's illegitimacy was of personal concern to Herzen, who was himself illegitimate.
- Nathaniel Hawthorne, The Scarlet Letter (1850 novel): Hester Prynne gives birth after committing adultery, refuses to name the father, and is cast out of Puritan society.
- William Makepeace Thackeray, The History of Henry Esmond (1852 historical novel): supposed illegitimate protagonist, who finally receives documents proving his legitimacy but destroys them in order not to injure the heirs to his property. Set during the English Restoration.
- Elizabeth Gaskell, Ruth (1853 social novel): a compassionate portrayal of an orphaned young seamstress, Ruth Hilton, who is seduced, impregnated and abandoned by gentleman Henry Bellingham.
- Wilkie Collins had concurrent domestic relationships with two women, who knew about each other. "For Collins, the theme of illegitimacy was more than just a plot mechanism: through his fiction he continually questioned society's condemnation of the unmarried mother and her child."
  - Hide and Seek (1854), about the parentage of a deaf and dumb girl "Madonna" adopted by an artist and his wife.
  - The Dead Secret (1857 novel), concerns the unexpected discovery of a character's illegitimacy and the resulting moral dilemmas that face the character.
  - The Woman in White (1859), centred on illegitimacy, and the lengths that one of the main characters, the illegitimate Sir Percival Glyde, goes to conceal it. (See also Wilkie Collins' The Woman in White in "Look-alike: Literature".)
  - No Name (1862). Two sisters are disinherited when their parents' death reveals them to be bastards; one accepts her reduced circumstances, but the other plots revenge.
- Alexandre Dumas, fils (illegitimate son of Alexandre Dumas, père), in his play The Illegitimate Son (1858), espoused the belief that if a man fathers an illegitimate child, then he has an obligation to legitimize the child and marry the woman.
- Anthony Trollope:
  - Doctor Thorne (1858 novel): two sets of country gentlefolk fallen on hard times are especially proud of their "pure blood", but the well-meaning doctor brings up his illegitimate niece as a lady and then discovers that there is no place for her in their social world.
  - Ralph the Heir (1871 novel): The estate of Newton Priory is entailed upon the legitimate heir, nephew of the current Squire; the Squire tries to buy the reversion from the spendthrift, debt-ridden heir so that the Squire can leave it by will to his illegitimate son.
  - Lady Anna (1874 novel): The vicious Earl Lovel has told his wife that their marriage was invalid; during the two decades that she has struggled to prove its validity, their daughter Anna has grown up with her legitimacy in question. He dies intestate, and the disposal of his large fortune depends on her status.
- George Eliot:
  - Adam Bede (1859 novel): Hetty is seduced by a young officer who abandons her; she then abandons her baby in a field where it dies, and is tried for its murder.
  - Daniel Deronda (1876 novel): Gwendolen Harleth discovers that her suitor Henleigh Grandcourt has four illegitimate children with an ex-mistress. She initially spurns him but later marries him when her family is ruined. Also, the other protagonist, Daniel, suspects (albeit mistakenly) that he might be the illegitimate son of his guardian Sir Hugo Mallinger.
- Victor Hugo, Les Misérables (1862 novel): Cosette is the illegitimate daughter of Fantine and Felix Tholomyes. After Tholomyes abandons Fantine and Cosette, Fantine entrusts Cosette to the care of the Thénardiers (who secretly force her to work as a scullery maid) and pays them for Cosette's care. After Fantine dies of tuberculosis, Jean Valjean rears Cosette; when she grows up, she falls in love with Marius Pontmercy, whom Jean Valjean saves when an insurrection is crushed.
- Leo Tolstoy:
  - War and Peace (1869 novel): one of the principal protagonists, Pierre Bezukhov, is an illegitimate child of a dying father who has many other illegitimate children. Pierre is chosen to inherit his father's fortune and title of Count Bezukhov.
  - Anna Karenina (1877 novel): Anna has an affair with Count Aleksei Vronsky, which leads to an illegitimate daughter, whom she names Annie. This incident drives the rest of the plot towards its tragic conclusion.
- Thomas Hardy:
  - Far from the Madding Crowd (1874 novel): Frank Troy and Bathsheba's servant Fanny Robin are lovers before and when they part after Fanny misses their wedding, she is pregnant, unknown to him. Following Troy's marriage to Bathsheba, Fanny returns and encounters Troy again before dying in childbirth along with her child. Gabriel Oak fails to conceal the facts from Bathsheba and she is devastated when Troy tells her that he only loved Fanny. The events lead to tragic consequences.
  - Two on a Tower (1882 novel): the heroine, Lady Viviette Constantine, chooses a loveless marriage over the shame of giving birth to an illegitimate baby.
  - The Mayor of Casterbridge (1886 novel): the protagonist Michael Henchard believes that Elizabeth Jane is the daughter he abandoned, when she returns to him years later along with his wife; but after his wife's death he finds out from her letter that his own daughter died and this Elizabeth Jane is the illegitimate child of Captain Newson, to whom he had 'sold' his wife many years ago. Initially this affects his feelings for Elizabeth, but later he begins to love her as his own child and hides her true parentage from her, which leads to tragedy.
  - Tess of the d'Urbervilles (1891 novel): the eponymous heroine is raped by her employer Alec; she gives birth but the baby dies.
  - Jude the Obscure (1895): Jude and Sue have two children together and it is later revealed that they are not married, making the children illegitimate. The children are killed by Jude's legitimate son with his ex-wife Arabella, who also hangs himself, and the shock sends Sue into premature labour with another child, who dies.
- Alphonse Daudet, Jack (1876 novel): about an illegitimate child, a martyr to his mother's selfishness.
- Bolesław Prus often discussed illegitimacy in his journalistic writings. Stories by him involving it include:
  - "An Orphan's Lot" ("Sieroca dola", 1876 short story).
  - "Little Stan's Adventure" ("Przygoda Stasia", 1879 short story): a year-and-a-half-old boy wanders off from his parents; winds up, after a series of chance occurrences, in the home of another townsman; is thought by that man's neighbors to resemble him, and is assumed by them to be his out-of-wedlock child. The perfectly legitimate boy is eventually reunited with his parents; and the townsman, who has developed an emotional attachment to the boy, regrets that the boy is not his own, if out-of-wedlock, son.
- Ivan Turgenev, Virgin Soil (1877 novel): the main character, Nezhdanov (whose name means "unexpected"), is an illegitimate son of a Russian aristocrat. With a desire to do something in the world, he joins the Narodniki, hoping to find his place by "going to the people". In the end, Nezhdanov's confusion about his divided life causes him to commit suicide.
- Fyodor Dostoyevsky, The Brothers Karamazov (1880 novel): Fyodor Pavlovich Karamazov is the father of three sons, and widely rumored to have fathered a fourth, illegitimate son, Pavel Smerdyakov. Although the eldest son, Dmitri, is put on trial for the murder of his father, Pavel later confesses the crime to Ivan, another of Karamazov's sons.
- Henry James, The Portrait of a Lady (1881 novel): the heroine, Isabel Archer, discovers that the daughter of her husband Gilbert Osmond is not his first wife's child but was born to Madam Merle, who had been his lover many years ago.
- Hall Caine:
  - Son of Hagar (1886 novel): opening scene is set in Victorian London police court where a girl is charged with attempted suicide after she and her illegitimate baby had been dragged from the Thames. The girl later marries and becomes Mrs. Ritson, the wife of a Cumbrian dalesman, and has two more sons.
  - The Bondman (1890 novel): A complex revenge/romance set in late 18th century Isle of Man and in Iceland. Stephen Orry, a dissolute seaman, marries Rachael, the daughter of Iceland's Governor-General, and deserts her before their boy Jason is born.

=== Twentieth century ===
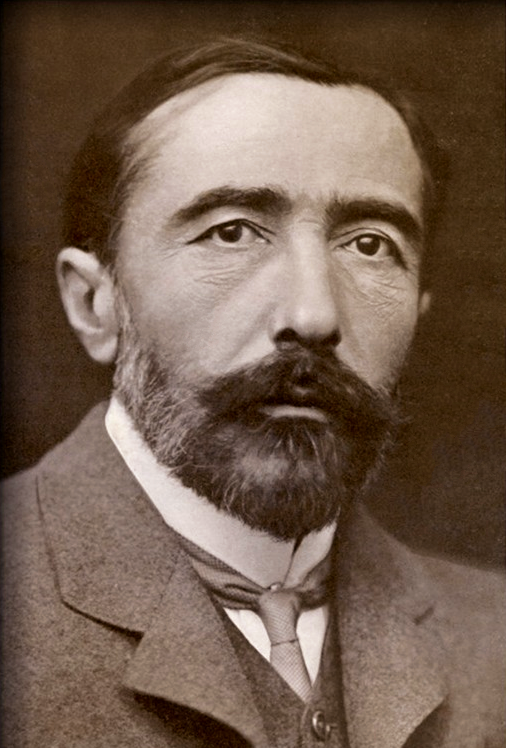
Conrad

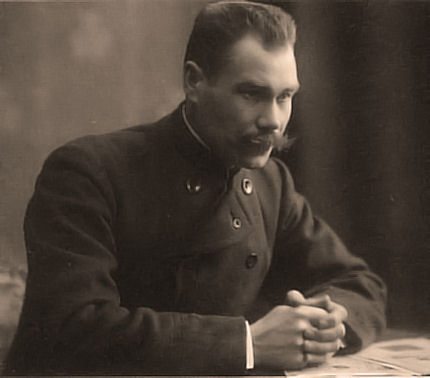
Linnankoski

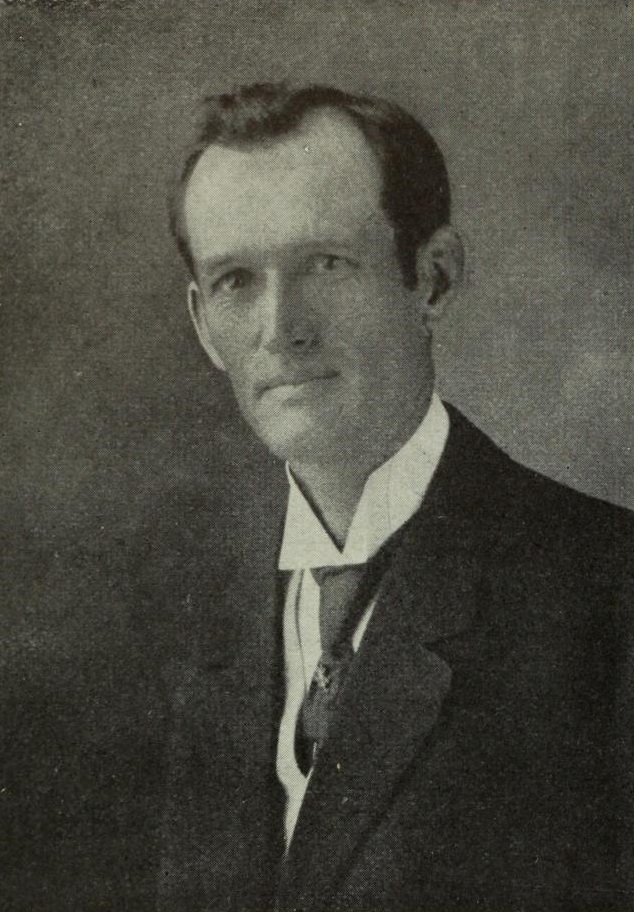
Wright

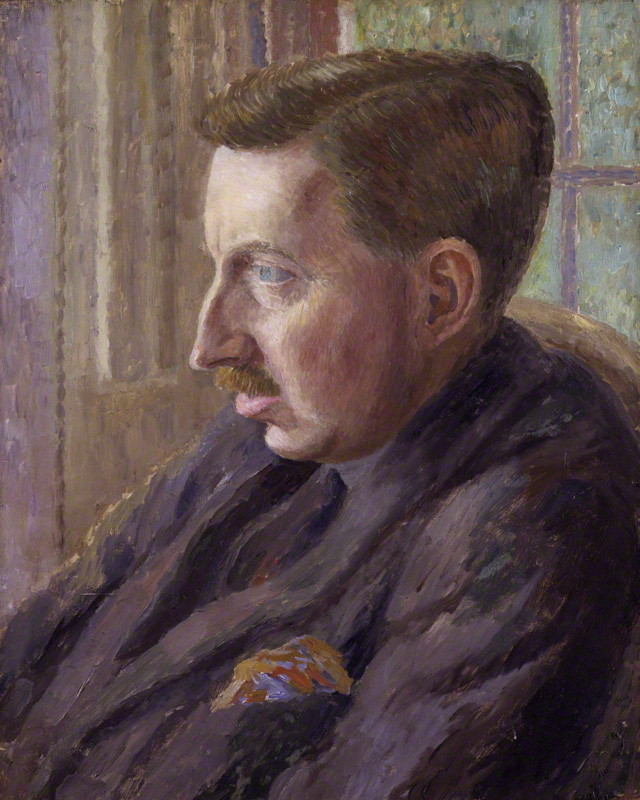
Forster

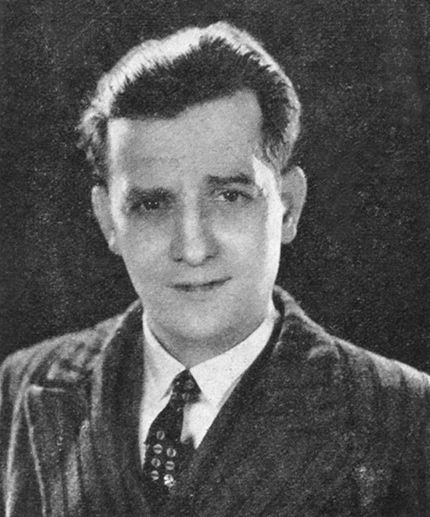
Pagnol

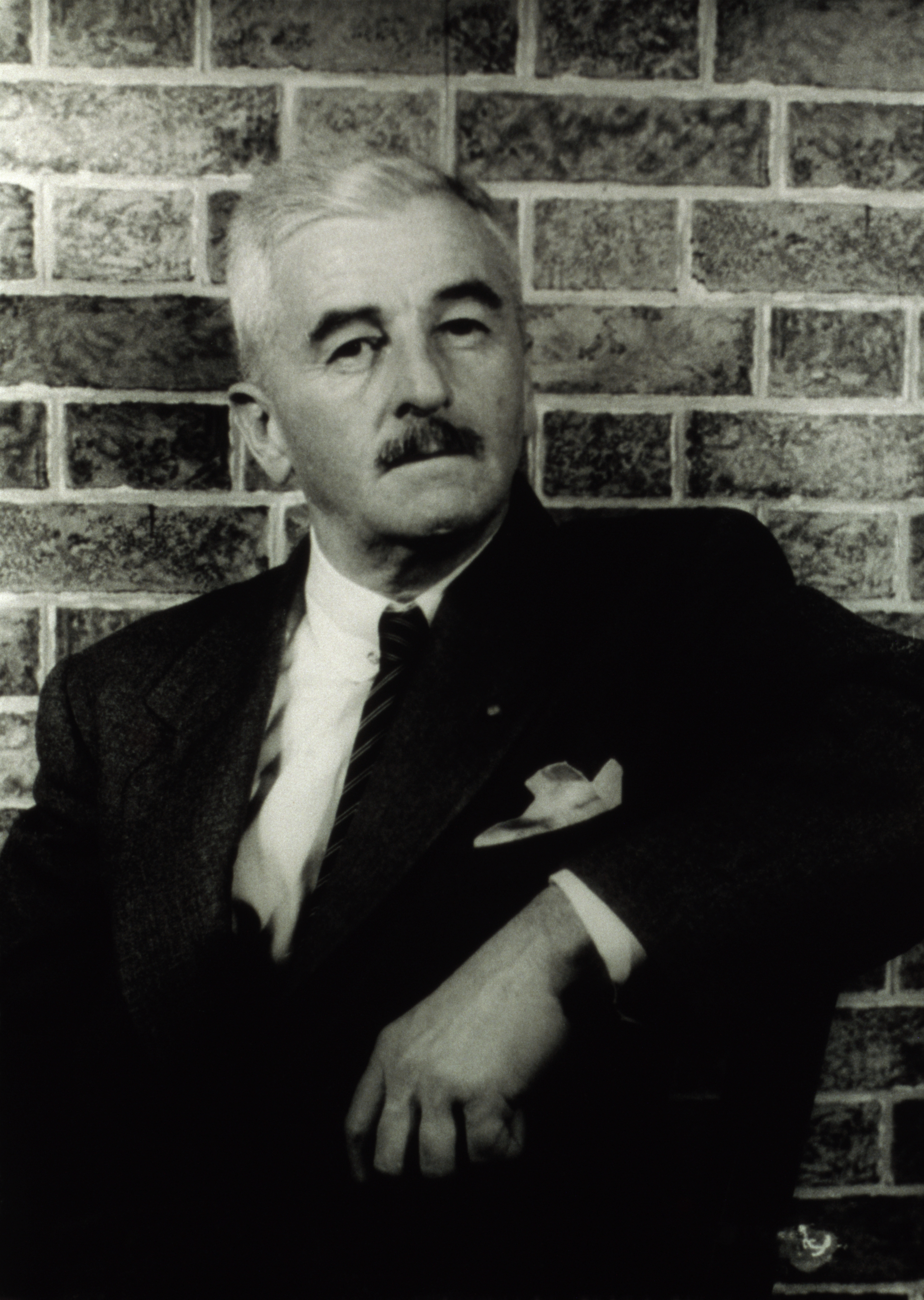
Faulkner

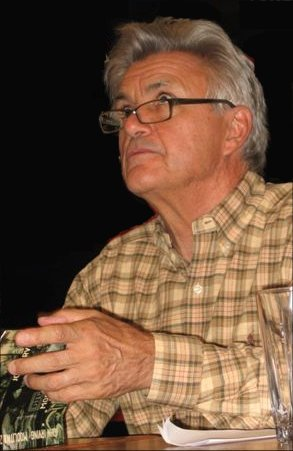
Irving

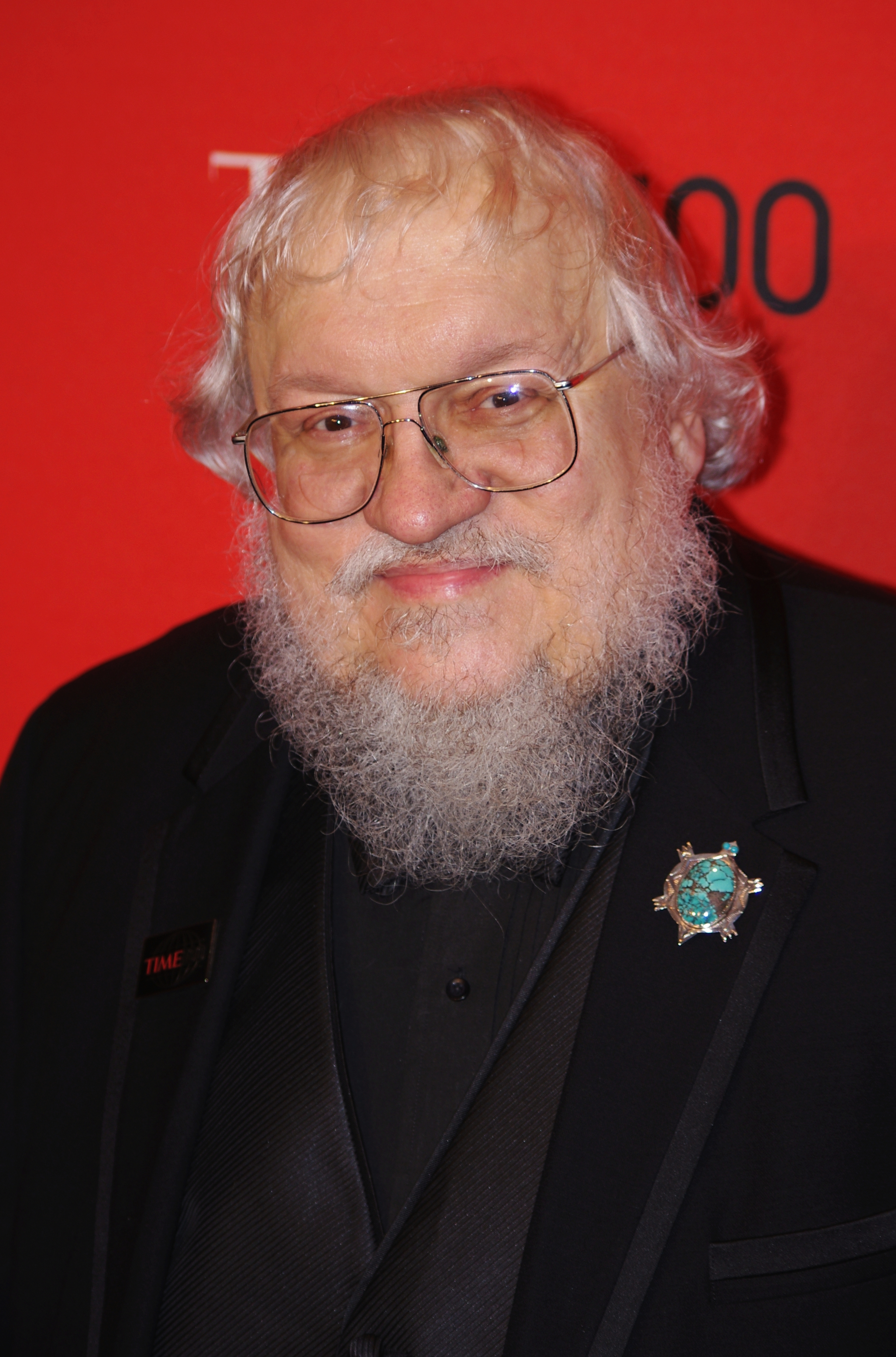
Martin

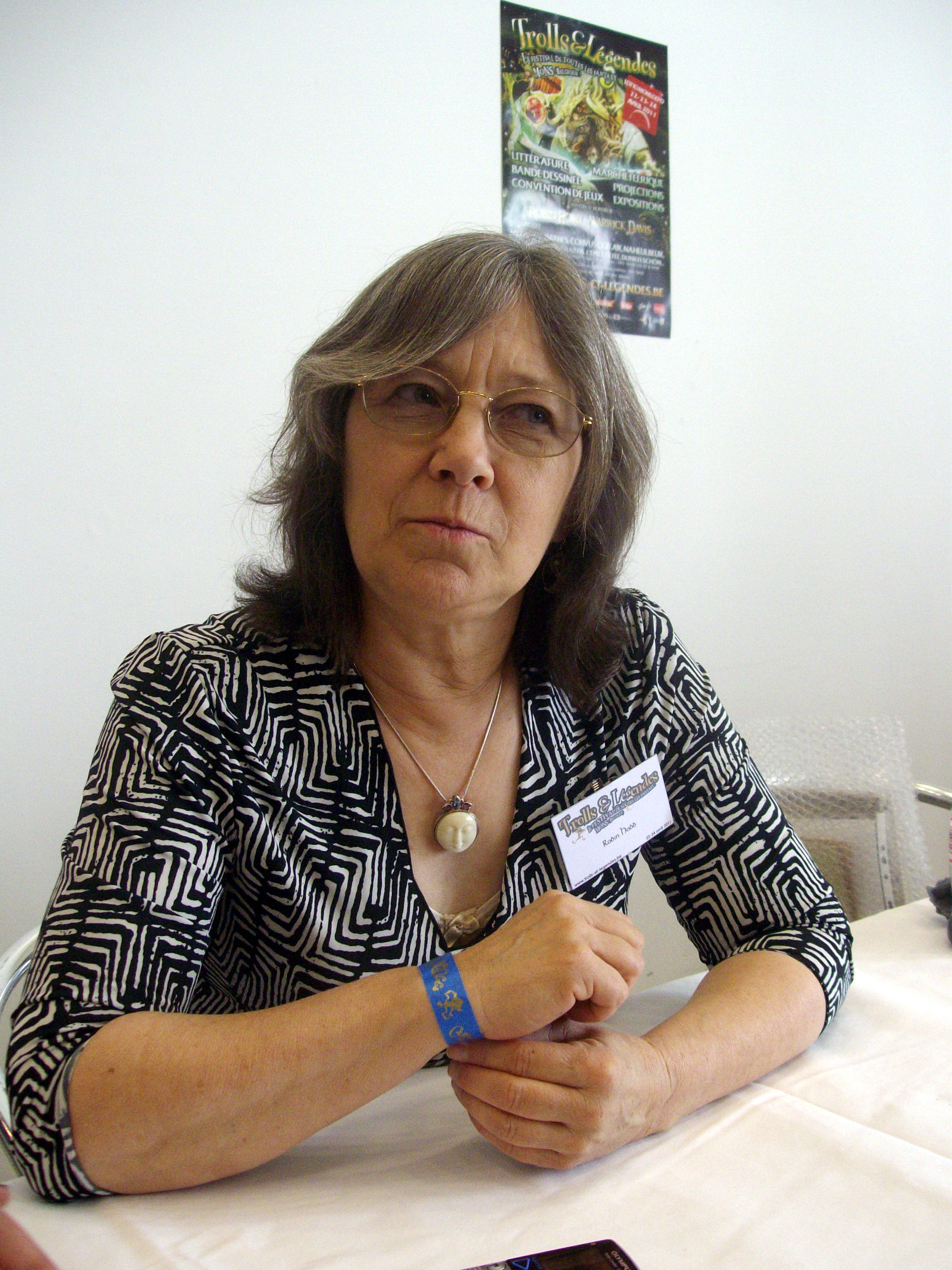
Hobb

- Harold Bell Wright, The Shepherd of the Hills (1907): the Shepherd's son ("Mad Howard") has fathered an illegitimate child (Pete) with Grant "Old Matt" Matthews' daughter (who died giving birth). Mad Howard leaves the Ozarks but returns and secretly converses with Pete; separately, the Shepherd relocates to the Ozarks and befriends Old Matt. Old Matt, meanwhile, has sworn vengeance on Pete's father and grandfather, not knowing that the Shepherd is Pete's grandfather. At the end, Old Matt forgives the Shepherd and Mad Howard.
- Johannes Linnankoski, The Fugitives (1908): based on actual events, the novella tells of a peasant family which moved from Tavastia to Savonia due to shame and fear of gossip because the daughter of the family had married an elderly widower but had had an illegitimate child with another man.
- Joseph Conrad, Under Western Eyes (1910): the protagonist, Razumov, is the illegitimate son of a Russian prince, by whom he is unacknowledged save to the extent of being supported as a student at the University of St. Petersburg. A fellow-student, Victor Haldin, a revolutionist who has just assassinated a savagely repressive government minister, asks Razumov to help him escape. Razumov, with his father's help, turns him in, and Haldin is hanged. Razumov finds himself admired by university companions as Haldin's associate in killing the detested minister. The authorities send him as a government spy to Geneva, a center of anti-tsarist intrigue. There, he finds, live Haldin's mother and sister, who share Haldin's liberal convictions; Razumov falls in love with the sister and eventually confesses having turned in her brother. He then confesses the same to the assembled revolutionists, who burst his eardrums, making him deaf for life. He staggers away, is knocked down by a streetcar, and finally returns as an obscure cripple to Russia.
- E. M. Forster, Howards End (1910): Helen Schlegel has a brief affair with Leonard Bast, resulting in a pregnancy which she tries to conceal from her family by going abroad. The discovery of this fact and of the identity of her lover causes a rift between Margaret and Henry Wilcox and has tragic consequences for Leonard.
- David Graham Phillips, Susan Lenox: Her Fall and Rise (1912), made into a movie starring Clark Gable and Greta Garbo.
- C. S. Forester, Brown on Resolution (1929 novel): the protagonist, an illegitimate British sailor and the only survivor of his ship, escapes custody aboard an Imperial German raider making repairs off an island in the South Atlantic and delays the ship's departure long enough for a British ship to arrive and destroy it, losing his life in the process. The captain of the British ship is the sailor's father, who never knew of his son's existence.
- Marcel Pagnol:
  - Marius (1929 play).
  - Fanny (1932 play).
  - César (1936 play).
- William Faulkner, As I Lay Dying (1930 novel): The character Jewel Bundren is revealed to be the illegitimate child of Addie Bundren and Reverend Whitfield.
- Dorothy L. Sayers, The Nine Tailors (1934 mystery novel): fear of uncovering illegitimacy and the social shame that that would bring are key plot drivers in the murder.
- Grace Metalious, Peyton Place (1956 novel): The main plot follows the lives of three women in a small New England town — lonely, repressed Constance MacKenzie, her illegitimate daughter Allison, and her employee Selena Cross.
- Violette Leduc, La Batarde (1964 autobiography).
- Marguerite Yourcenar, The Abyss (1968 historical novel): centres on a man's quest for meaning in his life, and the consequences of his illegitimate birth on his mother (devastating) and his father (very little). Belgian filmmaker André Delvaux adapted it into a movie in 1988.
- Patrick O'Brian's Aubrey-Maturin series, set in the Regency era, has Dr. Stephen Maturin y Domanova as one of its main characters. Being the illegitimate son of an Irish official and a Catalan lady, he faces many small but significant problems, such as being considered a poor match by many people (including himself) when contemplating marriage, risking insult often, in a society in which offenses and their settlement through a duel have an important weight in a gentleman's honour, and feeling anxious when one of his close friends is pregnant with an illegitimate child herself.
- Ellis Peters' The Cadfael Chronicles, a series of historical mysteries set during the Anarchy, has several important illegitimate characters appearing in several of the books. The difference between Welsh and English law regarding inheritance as well as different customs and attitudes regarding illegitimacy (for both the parents and the children) comes up more than once; additionally, in the sixth book, Cadfael discovers that he had fathered an illegitimate child during his days as a crusader, and said child appears in three of the novels all told.
- John Irving, The World According to Garp (1982 novel): the eponymous protagonist is conceived outside of marriage, under bizarre circumstances that permeate the book.
- Angela Carter, Wise Children (1991 novel): several generations of illegitimacy in a theatrical family.
- Tanya Huff, Blood Books (1991–97 series of novels): Henry Fitzroy, the illegitimate son of Henry VIII, lives in modern-day Toronto, Canada, having long ago been turned into a vampire. He now earns a living writing romance novels and forms a relationship with Vicki Nelson, a former police officer.
- Melina Marchetta, Looking for Alibrandi (1993 novel): involves a main theme of illegitimacy—of a year-12 student, whose father comes back into her life after having left her mother 18 years earlier. It also involves a massive theme of multiculturalism.
- Dorothy Allison, Bastard out of Carolina (1993 novel): Bone, the protagonist, is an illegitimate child referred to as a bastard. Her mother, Anney, is fifteen years old when she gives birth to her, and she unsuccessfully tries to petition for Bone's legitimacy. Anney goes on to marry a man named Lyle and have a legitimate daughter named Reese.
- Robin Hobb, The Farseer Trilogy (1995–97) and subsequent novels set in The Realm of the Elderlings focus on "Fitz", a prince's illegitimate son who is named for his bastardy.
- George R. R. Martin, A Song of Ice and Fire (series of novels, 1996–present): Illegitimacy is a central theme throughout the series, and many major characters have or are illegitimate children. Illegitimacy also instigates the War of Five Kings when Ned Stark discovers that Queen Cersei's children are actually bastards.

== Musicals ==
- Fanny (1954–57?, based on Marcel Pagnol's trilogy of plays, Marius, Fanny and César)

== Music ==
- Cher, "Gypsys, Tramps & Thieves" (1971)
- Diana Ross and the Supremes, "Love Child" (1968 number-one hit single)
- Michael Jackson, "Billie Jean" from Thriller (1982).

== Films ==
- Marius—Marcel Pagnol's 1931 French-language film adapted from his 1929 play Marius
- Fanny—Marcel Pagnol's 1932 French-language film adapted from his 1932 play Fanny
- Brown on Resolution (1935), based on C. S. Forester's book of the same name
- César—Marcel Pagnol's 1936 French-language comedy-drama conclusion to his trilogy about a Marseille couple, played by Pierre Fresnay and Orane Demazis.
- Port of Seven Seas—1938 dramatic film written by Preston Sturges, based on the plays of Marcel Pagnol and the films based on them. The film was directed by James Whale, starred Wallace Beery, and featured Frank Morgan and Maureen O'Sullivan.
- La Fille du Puisatier (The Well-Digger's Daughter) — a 1940 French romantic comedy drama directed by Marcel Pagnol.
- Blossoms in the Dust (1941), which tells the story of the non-fictional Edna Gladney who takes it upon herself to help orphaned children to find homes, despite the opposition of the "good" citizens who think that illegitimate children are beneath their interest.
- In Arsenic and Old Lace (1944) Mortimer Brewster, (played by Cary Grant), is relieved to learn he is a bastard and no relation to the socially eminent but murderous Mayflower settlers who "scalped the Indians" whose descendants brought him up and so has no taint of hereditary insanity.
- Sailor of the King (1953), also based on Brown on Resolution. The film has two endings; in one, the sailor dies and his origin is revealed; in the other, he survives and his origin is not revealed. In both endings the sailor is shown to be Canadian, as the actor chosen for the part (Jeffrey Hunter) was American.
- Peyton Place (1957), based on the best-selling novel by Grace Metalious
- Fanny (1961, adapted from the musical play, which in turn had been adapted from Marcel Pagnol's trilogy of plays, Fanny, Marius and César)
- The Godfather Part III (1990), Vincent Corleone (Andy Garcia), the son of Sonny Corleone and his mistress, Lucy Mancini, succeeds Michael Corleone as the new Don of the Corleone Family.
- King Ralph (1991), American ex-lounge entertainer Ralph Jones (John Goodman) is chosen to be the next king of England by representatives of the British Royal family after the family's demise following a freak accident. Ralph discovers that his paternal grandfather was the fictional Duke of Warren (of the House of Wyndham), the current ruling dynasty, and he was therefore the surviving illegitimate heir.
- In Robin Hood: Prince of Thieves (1991), Robin learns he has a half-brother whom their father sired by his mistress; the Sheriff of Nottingham discovers that Mortianna is his mother, his father being implied to be Satan himself.
- In The Devil's Advocate (1997), the mother of Kevin Lomax reveals that his father is John Milton.
- In The Man in the Iron Mask (1998), Philippe Bourbon is informed about D'Artagnan being his father.
- Gosford Park (2001), a murder mystery set in 1932, driven by hidden illegitimacy
- In Snow Dogs (2002), Ted Brooks discovers that his father is Jack Johnson.
- In Garfield: A Tail of Two Kitties (2006), Lady Eleanor Carlyle bequeaths her Castle to Prince XII, her beloved cat who bears a strong resemblance to Garfield. The Prince inherits the grand estate after Lady Eleanor Carlyle's death, which enrages the Lady's greedy nephew, Lord Manfred Dargis, who will now only inherit the grand estate once Prince passes away.
- The protagonist of In the Name of the King (2007) discovers that he is Konreid's son.
- The titular protagonist of Indiana Jones and the Kingdom of the Crystal Skull (2008) discovers that Mutt Williams is his son from an affair with Marion Ravenwood.
- La Fille du Puisatier (The Well-Digger's Daughter) — Daniel Auteuil's 2011 remake of Marcel Pagnol's 1940 film.
- In Thor (2011), Loki learns that Laufey is his biological father and that he was adopted by Odin.
- In Abduction (2011), Nathan Harper discovers that he was adopted and his real name is Steven Price.
- In Immortals (2011), Zeus is revealed to be the father of Theseus.
- In The Dark Knight Rises (2012), Miranda Tate is revealed to be the daughter of Ra's al Ghul.
- In The Cold Light of Day (2012), Will Shaw discovers that Lucia Caldera is his half-sister.
- In Resident Evil: The Final Chapter (2016), Alice discovers that she is a clone.
- In Joker (2019), the unknown father of Arthur Fleck is suspected to be Thomas Wayne.
- In Gemini Man (2019), Junior is unaware that he was Henry Brogan's clone before being adopted by Clay Varris.
- In “War of the Worlds (2025 film)”, William Bradford’s daughter is pregnant but isn’t married.

== Television ==
- Peyton Place (1964–69) – ABC TV series based on Grace Metalious' novel
- Dynasty (1981-1989) - Dominique Deveraux (born Millie Cox [ Diahann Carroll ]) was revealed to be the illegitimate daughter of Blake Carrington (John Forsythe)'s father Tom Carrington and, therefore, Blake's half-sister.
- Murphy Brown (1988–98) – the title character bore a baby out of wedlock, prompting criticism from Vice President Dan Quayle
- Friends (1994–2004) – Ross Geller and Rachel Green, two of the main characters, have an illegitimate child.
- Bastard out of Carolina (1996) – film made by Showtime Networks, directed by Anjelica Huston, based on a novel by Dorothy Allison, adapted by Anne Meredith; Jena Malone stars as a poor, physically abused and sexually molested girl.
- South Park (1997–present) – Eric Cartman is the illegitimate son of Liane Cartman and a fictitious Denver Broncos player, Jack Tenorman
- Midsomer Murders (1997–present) – the episode, "Bantling Boy", centered on the illegitimate son of a baronet.
- Gilmore Girls (2000–2007): the premise of the show is Lorelai Gilmore's raising her daughter out of wedlock, as a single mother, with the help of the fictitious town of Stars Hollow, Connecticut.
- One Tree Hill (2003–12) – Lucas Scott, illegitimate son of Dan Scott
- NCIS (2003–present) – Ziva David's paternal half-brother, Ari Haswari, is an illegitimate half-Jewish, half-Arab Mossad traitor.
- Justice League Unlimited (2004–2006) – Terry McGinnis and Matt McGinnis are illegitimate sons of Bruce Wayne. Their father Warren's reproductive DNA was replaced with that of Wayne's in an attempt to create a successor to Batman.
- 16 and Pregnant (2009-present) and its many spin-offs are reality TV shows about teenage girls who get pregnant out of wedlock.
- Downton Abbey (2010–15) – Charlie, the illegitimate son of Ethel Parks; Marigold, the illegitimate daughter of Lady Edith; Daniel Clark, the illegitimate son of Lord Sinderby.
- Archer (2009–2023) – Sterling Archer is the illegitimate son of Mallory Archer and a currently unknown father.
- Grimm (2011–17) – Sean Renard is the illegitimate son of a king and a hexenbiest; Adalind Schade has two love children, Diana and Kelly, respectively by Renard and Nick Burkhardt.
- Game of Thrones (2011–2019) – The series' plot is sparked by Jon Arryn learning that the royal children are all illegitimate due to Queen Cersei having committed incest with her twin brother, this being explored at length. Jon Snow, presumed illegitimate son of Eddard Stark; Ramsay Snow, illegitimate son of Roose Bolton; and Gendry, illegitimate son of Robert Baratheon, are also main characters. In each case, their being illegitimate (or presumed so) is explored, and it affects them in different ways. Ellaria Sand is the illegitimate daughter of Harmen Uller.
- Reign (2013) – Sebastian 'Bash' de Poitiers, part of the main cast, is the bastard son of King Henry II.
- House of the Dragon (2022–present) – Princess Rhaenyra Targaryen's three sons with her first husband Laenor Velaryon are bastards who were actually fathered by Harwin Strong, as all three children resemble him rather than Laenor, who is homosexual. Rumors surrounding their legitimacy weaken Rhaenyra's claim to the Iron Throne, leading to the war of succession known as the "Dance of the Dragons".
- Steven Universe - Though this is more of a technicality, Pink Diamond and Greg were unmarried when Pink gave up her existence to create the title character.

== Manga, anime, comic, game ==
- Assassin's Creed III – Connor Kenway (Ratonhnhaké:ton) the protagonist, is the illegitimate son of Haytham Kenway and Kaniehtí꞉io
- JoJo's Bizarre Adventure – Josuke Higashikata, the protagonist of Diamond Is Unbreakable, is the illegitimate son of Joseph Joestar, as the result of an extramarital affair with Tomoko Higashikata. In addition, Giorno Giovanna, the protagonist of Vento Aureo, is the illegitimate son of Dio Brando and an unnamed Japanese woman, being conceived with the body of Jonathan Joestar.
- Gakuen Alice – Mikan Sakura, the protagonist, is the illegitimate daughter of Izumi Yukihira and Yuka Azumi, though her parents were recognized as married after their deaths.
- Dragon Ball Z – Trunks is the illegitimate son of Vegeta and Bulma, (his parents got married one year after his birth).
- Blue Exorcist – Rin and Yukio Okumura are the illegitimate half-demons sons of Satan through unknown human woman.
- Ai Yori Aoshi – Kaoru Hanabishi (Honjo) is the son of parents who never married.
- Godchild – Cain Hargreaves and his half-brother are illegitimate children of the same father.
- Bunny Drop – Rin is thought the illegitimate daughter of Daikichi's grandfather.
- Kodomo no Jikan – Rin Kokonoe was born to an unwed mother.
- Kaze to Ki no Uta – Gilbert is the product of an affair between his father and his father's sister-in-law.
- Kare Kano – Soichiro was born of an affair, as his father had been.
- Ouran High School Host Club – Tamaki Suoh is the illegitimate son of Yuzuru Suoh.
- Batman – Damian Wayne (the fifth sidekick known as Robin) is the illegitimate son of Bruce Wayne and Talia al Ghul.
- Tekken – Jin Kazama is the illegitimate son of Kazuya Mishima and Jun Kazama. Lars Alexandersson is the illegitimate son of Heihachi Mishima.
- Fate/Apocrypha- Like her Arthurian counterpart, Mordred is an illegitimate child conceived between Artoria and Morgan le Fay via magic and was made into a homunculus clone of Artoria.
- Attack on Titan – Eren's friend, Historia Reiss, is the illegitimate daughter of Rod Reiss and a beautiful servant.
- Princess Jellyfish – Kuranosuke Koibuchi is the illegitimate son of Keiichiro Koibuchi and singer Lina as a result of their affair.
- Persona 5 – Futaba Sakura is the illegitimate daughter of Wakaba Isshiki and an unknown father. Goro Akechi is the illegitimate son of Masayoshi Shido, a politician.
- Marmalade Boy – Yuu Matsuura believes he is illegitimate, which colors his relationships with others, including the girl who loves him. This belief turns out to be mistaken.
- Maid Sama! – Takumi Usui is an illegitimate child as a result of an affair between his mother and her butler.
- Gatchaman Fighter – Count Egobossler is an illegitimate child as a result of an affair between his father and a beautiful maid.
- Marvel Comics – Tony Stark learns that his biological mother is Amanda Armstrong.
- BioShock Infinite – Elizabeth is adopted by Comstock, an alternate reality version of her real father Booker DeWitt.
- The Witcher 3: Wild Hunt – Ciri discovers that she is the princess of Cintra.
- Devil May Cry 5 – Dante reveals his twin brother Vergil as the father of Nero.
- Candy Candy - Terence "Terry" Graham Granchester is the illegitimate son of a British duke and an American actress
- The Elder Scrolls IV: Oblivion - Martin Septim is presented as the last surviving, illegitimate son of Emperor Uriel Septim VII
- Resident Evil 6 - Jake Muller is the illegitimate son of series antagonist Albert Wesker and an unnamed woman.
- Dishonored - Emily Kaldwin is the illegitimate daughter of the Empress Jessamine Kaldwin and her bodyguard Corvo Attano. Delilah Copperspoon is revealed to be the illegitimate daughter of Jessamine's father Euhorn Kaldwin and a kitchen maid.
- In the Kingdom Come video game franchise, the protagonist Henry is the fictional illegitimate son of the real proto-Protestant Czech nobleman Racek Kobyla of Dvorce who was assassinated by a Catholic mob in early 1416.

== See also ==
- Legitimacy (family law)
