= Trash: Short Stories =

1988 short story collection by Dorothy Allison

- Author: Dorothy Allison
- Language: English
- Subject: Short story anthology
- Published: 1988
- Publisher: Firebrand Books (1988); Penguin (1990); Plume (2002)
- Pages: 219
- Awards: 1989 Lambda Literary Award for Best Lesbian Small Press Book; 1989 Lambda Literary Award for Best Lesbian Fiction
- ISBN: 9780932379511
- OCLC: 49525897

Trash: Short Stories is a short story collection by Dorothy Allison first published in 1988 by Firebrand Books, and later by Penguin (1990) and Plume (2002). It won the 1989 Lambda Literary Award for Lesbian Small Press Book and the Lambda Literary Award for Lesbian Fiction. Its linked stories explore "a poor white Southern woman's decision to confront the violence, poverty and pain of her existence, and in the face of all of it to embrace her class, her culture and her lesbian sexuality."

== Contents ==
- River of Names
- Meanest Woman Ever Left Tennessee
- Mama
- Gospel Song
- I'm Working On My Charm
- Steal Away
- Monkeybites
- Don't Tell Me You Don't Know
- Demon Lover
- Her Thighs
- Muscles of the Mind
- Violence Against Women Begins at Home
- A Lesbian Appetite
- Lupus

== Re-release ==
The re-release by Plume in 2002 contained a new short-story:

- Compassion

The 2002 re-release also included Deciding to Live: Preface to the First Edition, which details the transformation Allison goes through after a fight she has had with her lover, and her mother's reaction to her. It showcases Allison's beginning as a writer, a time when she wrote as a way to escape the monotony of her job as a low-level government clerk. Detailing the reasons for which she has decided to live, Allison reveals the underlying truth behind her stories and the reasons for which she writes fiction.

== Themes ==
Allison's short stories address themes such as: strength, cycles of poverty, identity, aggression, mother/daughter relationships, survival.

Survival: Allison's short story "Mama" showcases the correlation between abuse and poverty and what one must to do keep alive. Jack, the step-father, abuses the narrator and her mother. This abuse stems from the stress of Jack's unemployment. The lack of a steady pay labels the family as a lower economic household. The narrator's mother wants to leave Jack. We find this out in the short story "Don't Tell Me You Don't Know". The narrator quotes, "Some people get raped at eleven by a stepfather their mama half hates but can't afford to leave" (Allison, 105). This quote and different abuse instincts throughout "Mama" show us how the narrator's mother had to choose between an abusive household or homelessness. Both outcomes are undesirable. The mother used her survival instincts to choose the one that would keep her family alive.
