= Cavedweller =

Novel by Dorothy Allison

Cavedweller is the second novel from author Dorothy Allison. Much like her award-winning novel, Bastard Out of Carolina, Cavedweller deals with domestic violence, friendship among women, mother–daughter bonds, and poverty in the small-town American South. Although the point of view shifts throughout the novel, the story is told primarily from the perspective of Delia Byrd.

== Plot ==
Delia Byrd is a native of Cayro, Georgia, and a recovering alcoholic who lives in Los Angeles with her surly ten-year-old daughter, Cissy. The former lead singer of the obscure blues-rock band Mud Dog, Delia is supported primarily by Randall Pritchard, Cissy's father and a member of Mud Dog. The novel opens with Randall being killed in a motorcycle accident. Grief-stricken, nearly penniless, and desperate to reconcile with the daughters she left behind in Georgia, Delia packs up her daughter and drives nearly non-stop cross-country.

When she arrives in Cayro, she is confronted by townspeople who think she is a "hussy" for having left her two daughters despite being aware of the fact that Delia's husband was often abusive toward her. After a disappointing reunion with the grandfather who raised her, Delia enrolls Cissy at the local school, gets a job as a cleaning woman and sinks into a deep depression.

After emerging from the depression, Delia embarks on a quest to regain custody of her now-pubescent daughters, Amanda and Dede, from their hateful and puritanical paternal grandmother. She enlists the aid of the preacher at her mother-in-law's church. Despite the fact that the minister is able to convince the grandmother to consent to visits, Grandma Windsor does not keep her side of the bargain. Desperate, Delia approaches the girls' father, Clint, and makes a deal with him. Clint, who is gravely ill with cancer, agrees to transfer legal custody of the girls to Delia if she moves into his house and cares for him as he is unwilling to spend his last days in a hospital. After thoroughly cleaning the house, Delia moves all three girls in.

Things between Delia and her daughters are tense at first. Fourteen-year-old Amanda is as rigid and religion obsessed as her grandmother, frequently telling Cissy that she is going to hell. Dede is a sexually precocious twelve-year-old who likes to smoke cigarettes. They initially ignore their younger sister and her mother. The two older girls also hate their father, remembering the times that he assaulted his parents.

Cissy, unable to get along with any of her female relatives, takes pity on the bedridden Clint. She begins reading to him. Eventually, Clint begins to tell her about the early days of his marriage to Delia, expressing remorse about the violence he subjected her to.

After Clint dies, Cissy and Dede form a tight bond. However, Amanda remains intractable, frequently arguing with her mother and sisters. Amanda goes on to marry an aspiring preacher and gives birth to two sons in short order. After undergoing a procedure to remove gallstones, Amanda suffers a minor nervous collapse and begins rethinking her previous religiosity.

Cissy, who has had problems fitting in at school, develops an abiding friendship with Nolan, a classmate who shares her passion for science fiction novels. Nolan eventually introduces Cissy to spelunking and falls madly in love with Dede, who scorns his advances.

Dede, who has several brushes with the law and briefly battles drug addiction, eventually gets a job managing the convenience store. After Nolan rescues Dede from a gun-toting ex-boyfriend, the two embark on a passionate love affair.

Cissy begins making plans to return to Los Angeles to study at UCLA. This leaves the forty-something Delia at loose ends as the two older girls have already left home. She has broken up with Cayro's deputy sheriff and has no romantic prospects. Delia then resolves to begin a new chapter of her life by becoming more involved with her young grandsons.

== Critical reception ==
This book received mostly good reviews. The New York Times wrote, "This is not a novel interested in formal invention, in ironic distance or even in elegant prose ... It is clear-eyed about the economic forces that shape these women's lives, but it is also unabashedly emotional and hopeful about their futures. It reaches back to the conventions of straightforward storytelling and pays close attention to the way women get by, the way they come to forgive one another, the way they choose who they will be." Time magazine noted that "the central story of mother and daughter runs true, both on and beneath the surface." The book made the Los Angeles Times bestsellers list in 1998.
