= Bastard Out of Carolina (film) =

1996 film by Anjelica Huston

- DVD cover for Bastard Out of Carolina
- Directed by: Anjelica Huston
- Written by: Anne Meredith
- Based on: Bastard Out of Carolina by Dorothy Allison
- Produced by: Amanda DiGiulio
- Starring: Jennifer Jason Leigh; Jena Malone; Ron Eldard; Glenne Headly; Dermot Mulroney; Grace Zabriskie; Michael Rooker; Christina Ricci
- Narrated by: Laura Dern
- Cinematography: Anthony B. Richmond
- Edited by: Éva Gárdos
- Music by: Van Dyke Parks
- Distributed by: Showtime Networks
- Release date: December 15, 1996
- Running time: 96 minutes
- Country: United States
- Language: English

Bastard Out of Carolina is a 1996 American drama film made by Showtime Networks, directed by Anjelica Huston. It is based on the 1992 novel by Dorothy Allison and adapted for the screen by Anne Meredith. Jena Malone stars in her debut as a poor, physically abused and sexually molested girl.

In 1997, the theatrical and video releases of the film were banned by Canada's Maritime Film Classification Board. The video was eventually granted release upon appeal.

The film won an Emmy Award for Outstanding Casting for a Miniseries or a Special (Linda Lowy) and was nominated for Outstanding Directing for a Miniseries or a Special (Anjelica Huston), Outstanding Supporting Actress in a Miniseries or a Special (Glenne Headly), and Outstanding Made for Television Movie (Amanda DiGiulio, Gary Hoffman). It was screened in the Un Certain Regard section at the 1996 Cannes Film Festival.

== Plot ==
Ruth Anne "Bone" Boatwright is a young girl growing up in Greenville in the 1950s. Born out of wedlock to Anney, Bone lives with her mother and their extended family in a poor part of town. Anney loves Bone, but is still very much a child herself, exhausted from working and needy for both attention and adoration. Bone and Anney nearly always face the shame of the "ILLEGITIMATE" stamp on Bone's birth certificate. When the county courthouse burns down, Anney is happy that a copy of Bone's birth certificate no longer exists.

After her kind, hardworking first husband, Lyle Parsons, the father of Bone's half-sister, is killed in an automobile accident, Anney remarries a man named Glen Waddell, who seems attentive until Anney and Glen's baby dies at birth. Glen first molests Bone while waiting in the car for the birth of his child. Frustrated by the loss of his eagerly anticipated son, Anney's inability to have more children, and his own inability to manage his temper as well as maintain steady employment, Glen begins to physically and sexually abuse Bone regularly, beating her in the bathroom. Bone wakes her mother in the middle of the night, barely able to walk because of the immense pain she is in. Anney takes her to the hospital, where the doctor berates Anney for beating the child so badly that her coccyx is broken. The only thing Bone says is 'Mama.' Anney takes Bone to the car, leaving the hospital against the doctor's wishes, and slaps Glen's hand away as he tries to comfort the girl. Anney is saddened and angered by her new husband's behavior towards her child and takes Bone to her sister Alma's house to recover. However, once Bone is better, Anney returns to Glen after he swears to never touch Bone again. Yet the abuse resumes not long after.

While reading with her daughter at the cafe, Anney asks Bone to go stay with her Aunt Ruth, who is very sick. Ruth asks Bone about Glen and if he has ever hurt her. Bone says no, and the two grow close, listening to gospel music on the radio. After a visit from Dee Dee, Ruth dies from her illness. At Aunt Ruth's funeral, Bone's Aunt Raylene finds her in the bathroom, falling over drunk; when she tries to take her to a bed, she discovers lashes on her legs and alerts the girl's uncles, Earle, Wade, and Travis, who brutalize Glen for what he did to her. Bone is sent to live with her aunts, and eventually tells her mother that she will forgive her if she chooses Glen over her, but that she will never live under the same roof with him again.

Eventually, Glen comes around while the aunts are out, trying to force Bone to come back. But she refuses, asks him to leave, and then threatens to tell Anney everything he has done to her, even saying that she'd rather die than live with him again.

When Bone fights back, Glen brutally punches and then rapes her out of anger, breaking her arm. Anney discovers the rape and retaliates by beating Glen over the head with a glass bottle full of milk, breaking it and resulting in him bleeding profusely from his head, then screams at him, before kicking him off of her daughter in a protective rage and carrying her out of the house away from him and to her car.

Desperate, Glen (with his pants still around his knees) stumbles out of the house after Anney, begging her to forgive him and saying he can't live without her. Ignoring his pleas, she gets into her car, starts it, and tries to drive away, leaving him for good. Glen then leans against the car door and repeatedly smashes his head against it, screaming for Anney to kill him if he can't be with her anymore, as he breaks down crying. Instead, she strokes his head in forgiveness, believing he will never hurt Bone again. This causes Bone to feel disgusted and shocked, making her, for the first time, hate her own mother. Ultimately, Anney returns to Glen.

Moments after, Bone is visited at the hospital by her Aunt Raylene. When the cops attempt to question her about who brutalized her, she still refuses to reveal that it was Glen and calls out for her mother, who is nowhere to be found.

In the end, Bone is allowed to stay with her Aunt Raylene and Uncle Earle, far away from the reach of those who would harm her. Her mother visits one final time to deliver to her the copy of her birth certificate without the mark of "ILLEGITIMATE" and apologizes for what happened, saying that she loved Glen too much to see who he really was, and she tells Bone that she loves her, before ultimately driving away to rejoin Glen and split town with him without telling her where she's going. Bone, now estranged from her mother and Glen, remains with her Aunt Raylene and Uncle Earle, and with this final, tearful goodbye, she cries for her mother's sacrifice and for the freedom she has at last achieved. The film ends with Bone declaring that she forgives her mother.

== Cast ==
- Jena Malone as Ruth Anne "Bone" Boatwright
- Jennifer Jason Leigh as Anney Boatwright
- Ron Eldard as Glen Waddell
- Glenne Headly as Ruth
- Lyle Lovett as Wade
- Kelsey Elizabeth Boulware as Bone at age 4
- Dermot Mulroney as Lyle Parsons
- Christina Ricci as Dee Dee
- Michael Rooker as Earle
- Diana Scarwid as Raylene
- Susan Traylor as Alma
- Grace Zabriskie as Granny
- Laura Dern as Narrator (voice-over)
- Lindley Mayer as Reese
- Pat Hingle as Mr. Waddell
- Richard Todd Sullivan as Travis
- Jamison Stewart as Grey
- Timothy Stewart as Garvey
- Jeffrey Pillars as Truck Driver
- Rick Warner as Young Clerk
- Joe Maggard as Man at Cafe
- D.L. Anderson as Woman at Cafe
- Nelson George as Justice of the Peace
- Gene Dann as Worker
- Jim Gloster as Intern
- Derin Altay as Mrs. Parsons
- Sue Ellen Yates as Mr. Waddell's wife
- Sonny Shroyer as Sheriff
- Jerry Winsett as Brother Calvin
- J.C. Quinn as Officer
- Janice McQueen Ward as Neighbor (uncredited)

== Reception ==
On Rotten Tomatoes the film has an approval rating of 100% based on reviews from 9 critics. On Metacritic the film has a score of 75% based on reviews from 11 critics, indicating "generally favorable" reviews.

== See also ==
- Child sexual abuse
- Illegitimacy in fiction
