= Skin: Talking About Sex, Class & Literature =

Book by Dorothy Allison

- Author: Dorothy Allison
- Publisher: Firebrand Books
- Publication date: 1994
- Pages: 261 pp.
- ISBN: 978-1-56341-045-1
- OCLC: 30319398

Skin: Talking About Sex, Class & Literature is a collection of essays written by award-winning author Dorothy Allison. Published in 1994, the book contains original essays as well as updated versions of essays that appeared in anthologies and magazines like New York Native, The Village Voice, and Forum. As the title suggests, Allison gives the reader her take on her difficult childhood, race- and class-based schisms within the lesbian community, feminism, pornography, sadomasochism, and the transcending effect that literature can have on children.

== List of essays ==
1. Context
2. A Question of Class
3. Never Expected To Live Forever
4. Gun Crazy
5. Shotgun Strategies
6. What Do We See? What Do We Not See?
7. Neighbors
8. Not As a Stranger
9. Sex Writing, the Importance and the Difficulty
10. Puritans, Perverts, and Feminists
11. Public Silence, Private Terror
12. Her Body, Mine, and His
13. The Theory and the Practice of the Strap-on Dildo
14. Conceptual Lesbianism
15. Talking To Straight People
16. Femme
17. Sex Talk
18. Believing in Literature
19. A Personal History of Lesbian Porn
20. Myths and Images
21. Bertha Harris, a Memoir
22. Survival Is the Least of My Desires
23. Skin, Where She Touches Me
24. Promises

== Reviews ==
Sobriquet Magazine wrote: "In all, Skin: Talking About Sex, Class and Literature serves as a revealing and important work for scholars of working-class studies, feminism and gender politics, and queer theory...Allison’s collection is an interesting and personal look at the complexities of her identity formation, and the levels on which she engages each category of self is both honest and sometimes painful. What shapes Allison’s writing is not only her recognition of Self and need for Truth, but admittance to all facets of her identity." Publishers Weekly noted that the book was "impassioned, personal and highly intelligent, Allison's collection of published writings and addresses examines issues of class and sexuality through the intricate lenses of autobiography and the literary experience."

== Editions ==
- Allison, Dorothy. Skin: Talking About Sex, Class, and Literature, Firebrand Books, 1994.
