= Dorothy Allison =

American writer (1949–2024)

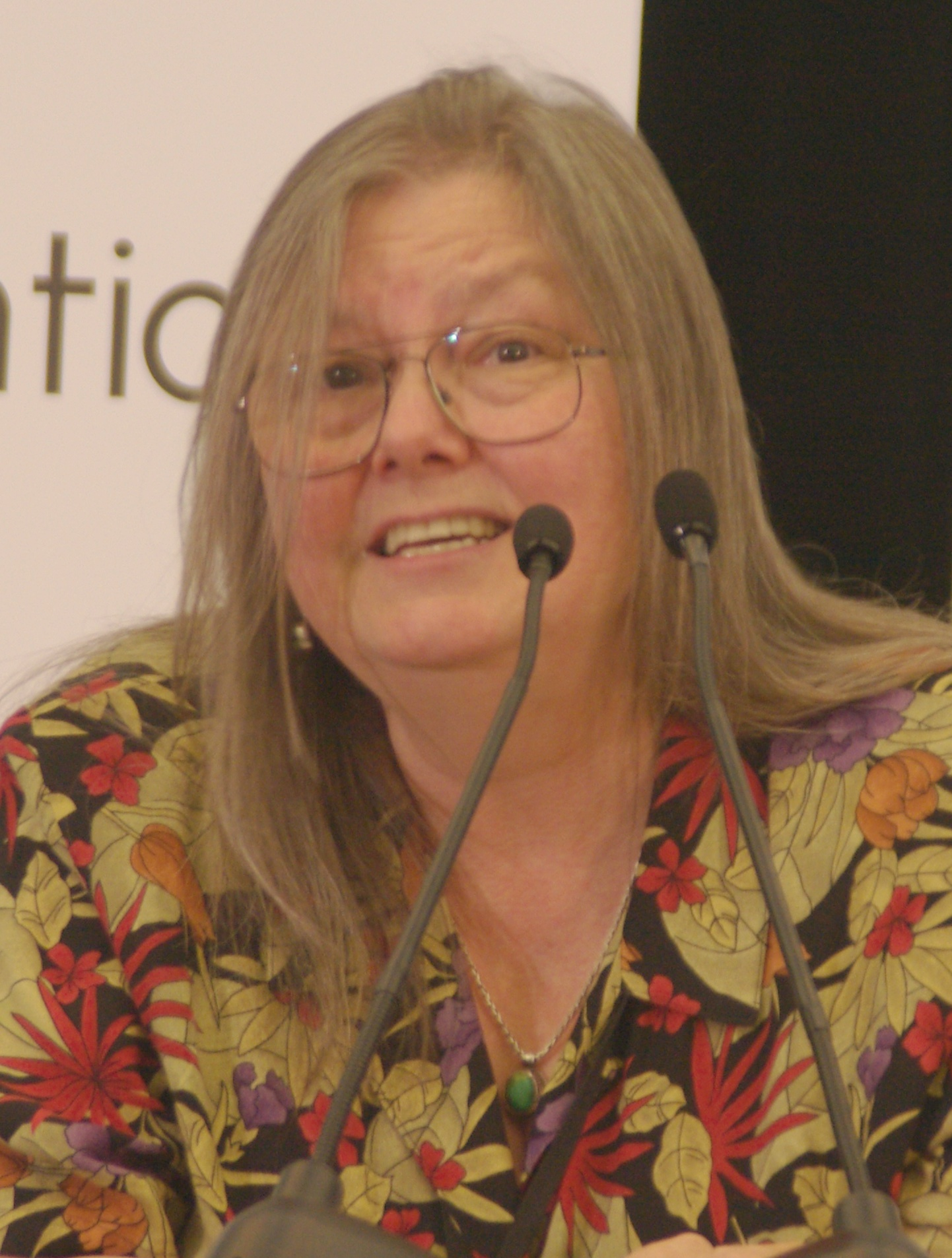
- Allison at the 2011 Miami Book Fair
- Born: April 11, 1949; Greenville, South Carolina, U.S.
- Died: November 6, 2024 (aged 75); Guerneville, California, U.S.
- Education: Florida Presbyterian College (BA); Florida State University; The New School for Social Research (MA)
- Occupations: Writer; poet; novelist
- Spouse: Alix Layman (died 2022)
- Children: 1
- Writing career
- Subjects: class struggle, child and sexual abuse, women, lesbianism, feminism, and family
- Literary movement: Feminism
- Website: dorothyallison.com (archived)

Dorothy Earlene Allison (April 11, 1949 – November 6, 2024) was an American writer whose writing focused on class struggle, sexual abuse, child abuse, feminism, and lesbianism. She was a self-identified femme lesbian. Allison won several Lambda Literary Awards. In 2014, Allison was elected to membership in the Fellowship of Southern Writers.

== Early life ==
Dorothy Earlene Allison was born in Greenville, South Carolina, on April 11, 1949, to Ruth Gibson Allison, who was 15 years old at the time. Her father died when she was a baby. Her single mother was poor, working as a waitress and cook. Ruth eventually married, but when Dorothy was five, her stepfather began to abuse her sexually. This abuse lasted for seven years. At the age of 12, Allison told a relative about it, who told her mother. Ruth forced her husband to leave the girl alone, and the family remained together. The respite did not last long, as the stepfather resumed the sexual abuse, continuing for five years. Allison suffered mentally and physically, contracting gonorrhea that was not diagnosed and treated until she was in her 20s. The untreated disease left her unable to have children.

When aged about 11, Allison moved with her family to Central Florida. Allison found respite from her family life in school. She said that she became aware of her lesbian sexuality during her early adolescence.

== Education ==
Allison was the first of her family to graduate from high school.

In 1967, Allison attended Florida Presbyterian College on a National Merit scholarship. While in college, she joined the women's movement by way of a feminist collective. She credited "militant feminists" for encouraging her decision to write. Also around this time, Allison severed all ties to her family until 1981. She graduated in 1971 with a Bachelor of Arts in anthropology.

Allison subsequently did graduate work in anthropology at Florida State University, the Sagaris Institute, and the New School for Social Research, where she earned a M.A. in urban anthropology in 1981.

== Career ==
Allison held a variety of jobs before gaining any success as a writer. From 1973 to 1974, she was the editor of the feminist magazine Amazing Grace, in Tallahassee, Florida. During this time, she was also a founding manager of Herstore Feminist Bookstore in Tallahassee. She worked as a salad girl, a maid, a nanny, and a substitute teacher. She also worked at a child-care center, answered phones at a rape crisis center, and clerked with the Social Security Administration. In certain periods, she trained during the day and at night sat in her motel room and wrote on yellow legal pads. She wrote about her life experiences, including the abuse by her stepfather, dealing with poverty, and her lust for women.

Allison's first book of poetry, The Women Who Hate Me, was published with Long Haul Press in 1983. In 1988, her first short story collection, Trash, was published by Firebrand Books. Her first novel Bastard Out of Carolina was published in 1992, becoming a best-seller. It was later adapted as a film of the same name, directed by Anjelica Huston for TNT. The book and film both generated controversy because of the graphic content, and the TV film was aired on Showtime rather than TNT. The Canadian Maritime Film Classification Board initially banned distribution of the film in Canada, but the ban was reversed on appeal. In November 1997, the Maine Supreme Judicial Court affirmed a State Board of Education decision to ban the book in public high schools because of its graphic content.

Allison published another novel, Cavedweller, and two collections of poetry and short stories.

In 1998, Allison founded The Independent Spirit Award to support writers who help sustain small presses and independent bookstores.

In 2006, Allison was the writer in residence at Columbia College in Chicago. The following year, Allison was Emory University Center for Humanistic Inquiry's Distinguished Visiting Professor and Famosa in residence at Macondo in San Antonio, Texas. In 2007, Allison announced that she was working on a new novel entitled She Who, to be published by Riverhead Books.

Allison held a three-month residency at Emory University in Atlanta in 2008 as the Bill and Carol Fox Center Distinguished Visiting Professor. In 2009, Allison was The McGee Professor and writer in residence at Davidson College, in North Carolina.

== Writing ==
Themes in Allison's work include class struggle, child and sexual abuse, women, lesbianism, feminism, and family. French literary scholar Mélanie Grué describes Allison's work as a celebration of "the vilified transgressive lesbian body." Grué also notes Allison's ability "to make [lesbian] desire and pleasure public" in her writing, in contrast to the second-wave feminist views on "correct expressions" of sexuality.

Her influences include Judy Grahn, Flannery O'Connor, James Baldwin, Jewelle Gomez, Toni Morrison, Bertha Harris, and Audre Lorde. Allison said The Bluest Eye by Morrison helped her to write about incest. In the early 1980s, Allison met Lorde at a poetry reading. After reading what would eventually become her short story "River of Names", Lorde approached her and told her that she simply must write. Upon moving to California, Allison explored the people and histories of the early gay women's liberation presses, stating "There were some great lesbian writers. You know, I made my pilgrimage to go see Judy Grahn."

== Activism ==
Allison said that the early feminist movement changed her life. "It was like opening your eyes under water. It hurt, but suddenly everything that had been dark and mysterious became visible and open to change." However, she admitted that she would never have begun to publish her stories if she had not gotten over her prejudices, and started talking to her mother and sisters again.

Allison advocated for safer sex and was active in feminist and lesbian communities. She and Jo Arnone cofounded the Lesbian Sex Mafia in 1981, the "oldest continuously running women's BDSM support and education group in the country".

== Honors and awards ==
Allison's first novel, the semi-autobiographical Bastard Out of Carolina (1992), was one of five finalists for the 1992 National Book Award. Publishing Triangle named Bastard Out of Carolina one of "The Triangle's 100 Best" novels of the 1990s. In 2007, Allison was elected to the Fellowship of Southern Writers. The same year, she was awarded the Jim Duggins Outstanding Mid-Career Novelists' Prize at the Saints and Sinners Literary Festival, as well as the Robert Penn Warren Award for Fiction.

In 2018, Allison received the Trailblazer Award from the Golden Crown Literary Society for being, in the words of Karin Kallmaker, "the original firebrand. She didn't write for approval, she wrote to survive. She is a firebrand, truthteller, and trailblazer." In 2019, the Alice B Readers Appreciation Committee of The Alice B Readers Award bestowed the Alice B Medal and honorarium upon Allison and the Thomas Wolfe Prize. Allison was the 2024 recipient of the Publishing Triangle's Bill Whitehead Award for Lifetime Achievement. This award celebrated the recipient's lifetime of work and commitment to fostering queer culture. She received a $3,000 prize, one of the largest cash prizes in LGBTQ+ letters.

Awards and honors for Allison's writing
Year	Title	Award	Result	Ref.
1989	Trash	Lambda Literary Award for Lesbian Fiction	Winner	
1989	Trash	Lambda Literary Award for Lesbian Small Press Book Award	Winner	
1992	Bastard Out of Carolina	ALA Outstanding Books for the College Bound and Lifelong Learners	Selection	
1993	Bastard Out of Carolina	Ferro Grumley Award for Lesbian Fiction	Winner	
1995	Skin	Stonewall Book Award	Winner	
1995	Skin	Lambda Literary Award for Small Press Book Award	Finalist	
1995	Skin	Lambda Literary Award for Lesbian Studies	Winner	
1996	Two or Three Things I Know for Sure	Stonewall Book Award	Finalist	
1998	Two or Three Things I Know for Sure	Lambda Literary Award for Lesbian Memoir or Biography	Finalist	
1998	Cavedweller	New York Times Notable Book of the Year	Selection	
1999	Cavedweller	Lambda Literary Award for Lesbian Fiction	Winner	
2013	Conversations with Dorothy Allison	ALA Over the Rainbow Project Book List	Selection	
2025	Trash	Golden Crown Literary Society Lee Lynch Classic Award	Winner	

== Personal life and death ==
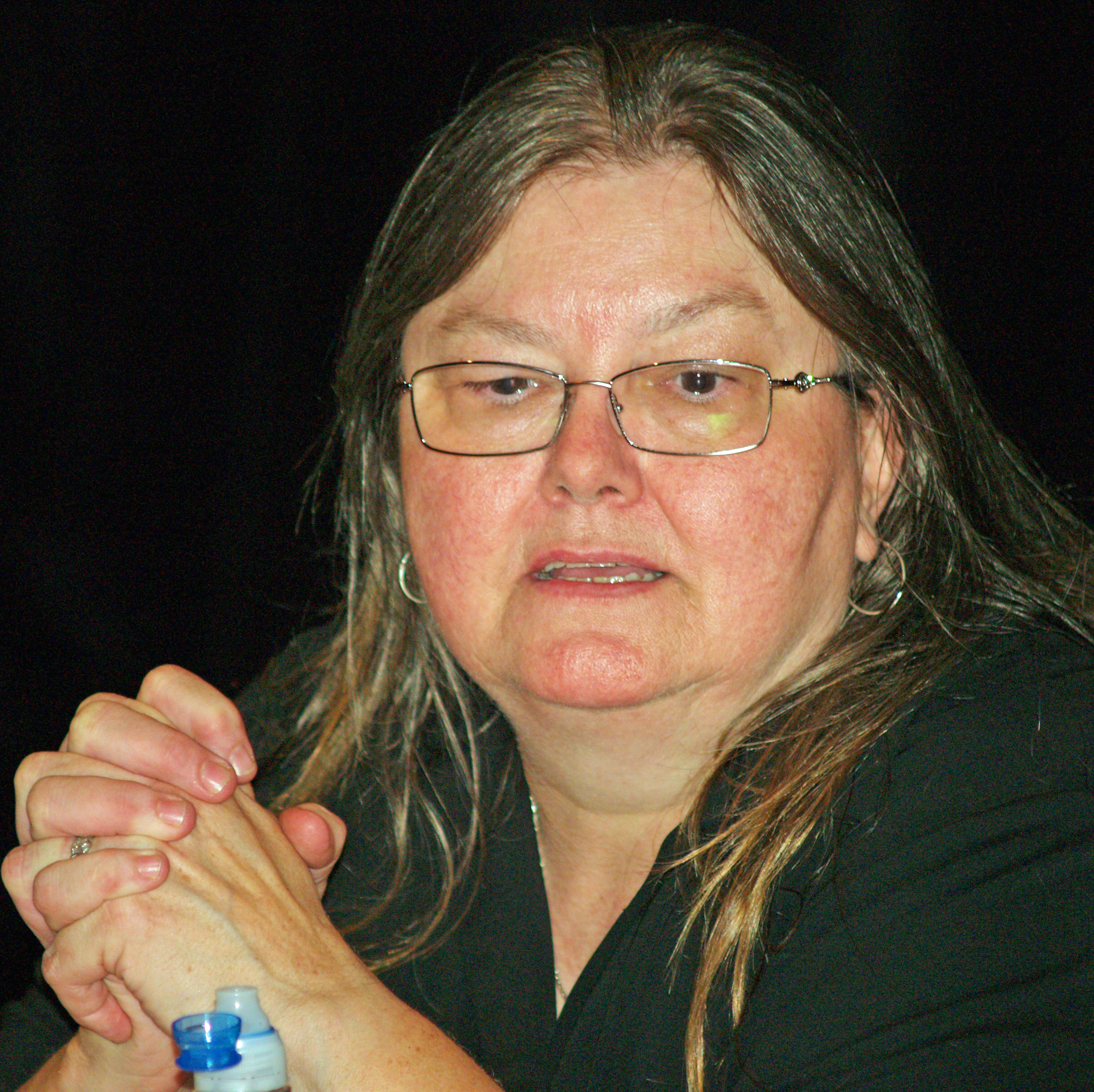
Allison at the 2008 Brooklyn Book Festival.

Allison later lived in Guerneville, California, calling herself a "happily born-again Californian". She lived with Alix Layman, her partner, and with her son, Wolf Michael. California is the setting of her third novel, She Who (unpublished and unfinished), which speaks about the lives of three women trying to figure out how to live in the aftermath of personal violence.

Layman died in 2022. Allison died of cancer on November 6, 2024. Her death was announced by the Frances Goldin Literary Agency, which represented her.

== Bibliography ==
=== Writing ===
- The Women Who Hate Me: Poems by Dorothy Allison (1983)
- Trash: Short Stories (1988) ISBN 978-0-452-28351-0
- The Women Who Hate Me: Poetry 1980–1990 (1991) ISBN 978-0-932379-98-6
- Bastard Out of Carolina (1992) ISBN 978-0-452-29775-3
- Skin: Talking About Sex, Class & Literature (1994) ISBN 978-0-04-440944-1
- Two or Three Things I Know for Sure (1995) ISBN 978-0-00-654881-2
- Cavedweller (1998) ISBN 978-0-452-27969-8
- Conversations with Dorothy Allison (2012) ISBN 978-1-61703-286-8
- Jason Who Will Be Famous (2009)

==== Anthology contributions ====
- Women on Women: An Anthology of American Lesbian Short Fiction, edited by Joan Nestle (1990) ISBN 978-0-452-26388-8
- High Risk: An Anthology of Forbidden Writings, edited by Amy Scholder and Ira Silverberg (1991) ISBN 978-0-452-26582-0
- Leatherfolk: Radical Sex, People, Politics and Practice, edited by Mark Thompson (1991) ISBN 978-1-55583-186-8
- Growing Up Gay/Growing Up Lesbian: A Literary Anthology, edited by Bennett L. Singer (1993) ISBN 978-1-56584-103-1
- Writing Women's Lives: An Anthology Of Autobiographical Narratives By Twentieth Century American Women Writers, edited by Susan Cahill (1994) ISBN 978-0-06-096998-1
- Downhome: An Anthology of Southern Women Writers, edited by Susie Mee (1995) ISBN 978-0-15-600121-2
- Swords of the Rainbow, edited by Eric Garber and Jewelle L. Gómez (1996) ISBN 978-1-55583-266-7
- The Best American Short Stories 2003, edited by Walter Mosley and Katrina Kenison (2003) ISBN 978-0-618-19733-0
- What Are You Looking At?: The First Fat Fiction Anthology, edited by Ira Sukrungruang and Donna Jarrell (2003) ISBN 978-0-15-602907-0
- Without a Net: The Female Experience of Growing Up Working Class, edited by Michelle Tea (2004) ISBN 978-1-58005-103-3
- Rhetorical Women: Roles and Representations, edited by Hildy Miller and Lillian Bridwell-Bowles (2005) ISBN 978-0-8173-5183-0
- All Out of Faith: Southern Women on Spirituality, edited by Wendy Reed (2006) ISBN 978-0-8173-1534-4
- New Stories from the South 2010: The Year's Best (2010) ISBN 978-1-58005-103-3
- Gay City: Volume 5: Ghosts in Gaslight, Monsters in Steam, edited by Vincent Kovar and Evan J. Peterson (2013) ISBN 978-1-4895-8014-6
- The Queer South: LGBTQ Writers on the American South, edited by Douglas Ray (2014) ISBN 978-1-937420-80-2
- Crooked Letter i: Coming Out in the South, edited by Connie Griffin (2015)
- Walk Till the Dogs Get Mean: Meditations on the Forbidden from Contemporary Appalachia, edited by Adrian Blevins and Karen Salyer McElmurray (2015) ISBN 978-0-8214-2168-0
- Badass Women Give the Best Advice: Everything You Need to Know About Love and Life (2018)
- LGBTQ Fiction and Poetry from Appalachia, edited by Jeff Mann and Julia Watts (2019) ISBN 978-1-946684-93-6
- The Penguin Book of the Modern American Short Story, edited by John Freeman (2021)

=== Filmography ===
- Bastard Out of Carolina (1996)
- 2 or 3 Things But Nothing for Sure (1997)
- After Stonewall (1999)
- Cavedweller (2004), directed by Lisa Cholodenko with Aidan Quinn and Kyra Sedgwick

=== Stage ===
- Cavedweller (2003), adapted for stage by Kate Moira Ryan at the New York Theatre Workshop

== In popular culture ==
Her name appears in the lyrics of the Le Tigre song "Hot Topic".
