= Bastard Out of Carolina =

1992 novel by Dorothy Allison

- Author: Dorothy Allison
- Language: English
- Genre: Drama; Coming-of-age novel
- Publisher: Dutton
- Publication date: March 1992
- Publication place: United States
- Media type: Print (hardcover & paperback)
- Pages: 309 pp
- ISBN: 978-0-525-93425-7 (1st ed. hardcover)
- OCLC: 24502970

Bastard Out of Carolina is a 1992 novel by Dorothy Allison. Semi-autobiographical in nature, the book is set in Allison's hometown of Greenville, South Carolina in the 1950s. Narrated by Ruth Anne "Bone" Boatwright, the primary conflict occurs between Bone and her mother's husband, Glen Waddell.

The novel examines the complexities of mother–child relationships, as well as conditions of class, race, and sexuality in the American South, all of which play out in Bone's life and her relationships with others.

The book has been translated into over a dozen languages, and was adapted into a film in 1996.

Named as one of the 136 Great American Novels by The Atlantic in March 2024.

== Plot ==
The book opens with Bone relating the details of her birth. Bone's 15-year-old mother, Anney, gives birth after being seriously injured in a car accident. Anney is not married, and is unconscious during delivery. Anney's older sister, Ruth, and their mother try to give a false name for Bone's father, and are caught in their deception. Bone is declared a bastard, a child born out of wedlock, and "illegitimate" is stamped in big red letters on her birth certificate. Anney, who "hated to be called trash", spends the next two years unsuccessfully petitioning to get a new birth certificate issued. This opens her up to the ridicule of customers at the diner where she works.

At 17, Anney marries Lyle Parsons and gives birth to another daughter, Reese, soon after. Lyle is killed in a car accident, leaving Anney "all bitter grief and hunger". After remaining single for a few years, she dates Glen Waddell, the son of a socially prominent dairy owner. They marry two years later, when Anney is pregnant once again.

Anney gives birth to a stillborn boy, and is unable to have more children. While Anney is in labor, Glen molests Bone in the car. The family's fortunes plummet, with Glen losing job after job due to his inability to control his anger. He begins abusing Bone physically; beatings and whippings leave her with bruises.

When Anney discovers the abuse, she leaves Glen, who promises never to do it again. Anney takes him back, and the abuse resumes. Anney leaves Glen again after her tough, hard-drinking brothers beat Glen to a bloody pulp when they discover the abuse. Bone then tells Anney that she will never live in the same house with Glen again. Bone says that she loves Anney and will forgive her if she decides to go back to Glen, but she remains firm that she will never live with him again. Anney vows not to go back to Glen unless Bone comes with her.

When Glen discovers this, he attacks Bone at her Aunt Alma's house, breaking her arm and raping her on the kitchen floor. Anney walks in on the assault and fights him off. Glen follows the two out to the car, with his pants around his knees, begging Anney to kill him rather than abandon him. To Bone's disgust and amazement, Anney ends up crying and throwing her arms around Glen. Anney then leaves with Glen.

Bone's Aunt Raylene takes her to the hospital and takes custody of her. While Bone is recovering at Raylene's house, Anney shows up with a new birth certificate for Bone, one without "illegitimate" stamped at the bottom. She begs Bone's forgiveness, and leaves without saying where she is going.

== Background ==
Bastard Out of Carolina is semi-autobiographical, echoing major parts of Allison's childhood, including being born to a teenaged mother, marked at birth as illegitimate, and suffering physical and sexual abuse at the hands of her stepfather throughout her childhood. The setting is the same: A poor white family in the 1950s deep South. However, in her 1995 memoir Two or Three Things I Know for Sure, she detailed which parts of Bone's story were similar to her own, and which were different. Allison named main character Bone after a poem she wrote about her own abuse, "To the Bone", which was included in her book of poems The Women Who Hate Me, which was published in 1991, a year before Bastard came out.

== Reviews ==
Upon publication, Bastard Out of Carolina achieved immediate mainstream success, with rave reviews from theVillage Voice, the San Francisco Chronicle, and The New York Times Book Review. In his NYTBR review, George Garrett notes that though some of the topics were the same as her earlier collection of short stories, the book "in no way seems to be a patchwork of short stories linked together. Everything, each part, belongs only to the novel" and is "as close to flawless as any reader could hope for". He compares it to J.D. Salinger's novel Catcher in the Rye and Harper Lee's novel To Kill a Mockingbird, writing, "Special qualities of her style include a perfect ear for speech and its natural rhythms; an unassertive, cumulative lyricism; an intensely imagined and presented sensory world, with all five senses working together; and, above all, again and again a language for the direct articulation of deep and complex feelings."

K. K. Roeder in the San Francisco Review of Books states that Allison "relates the difficulty of Bone's struggles with intensity, humor, and hard-wrought rejection of self-pity, rendering Bastard a rare achievement among works of fiction dealing with abused children." The New Yorker review called Bastard Out of Carolina a profound portrait of family dynamics in the rural South and "an essential novel". It asserts that "one way of reading Allison's novel is as a story about the power of such stories"—about who counts and who doesn't—"the ones that are told about us, the ones that we learn to tell about ourselves—and the way that they can expand our possibilities, or steamroll them."

Publishers Weekly says of the novel that "Allison spikes her critically acclaimed first novel, a National Book Award nominee, with pungent characters, and saturates it with a sense of its setting--Greenville, S.C." Kirkus Reviews provides a mixed review, lauding Allison's handling of sensitive yet overly familiar topics, like child abuse and sexual molestation, but concluding that as opposed to Allison's shorter-form works, Bastard Out of Carolina end up "compassionate if not very compelling", claiming that "after the often searing power of Allison's short stories, she seems not to have claimed her voice so much as tamed it."

Bastard Out of Carolina was named one of The Atlantic's Great American Novels of the Past 100 Years.

== Awards ==
Awards for Bastard Out of Carolina
| Year | Award | Result | Ref. |
|---|---|---|---|
| 1992 | ALA Outstanding Books for the College Bound and Lifelong Learners | Selection | |
| 1992 | National Book Awards for Fiction | Finalist | |
| 1993 | Ferro Grumley Award for Lesbian Fiction | Winner | |

== See also ==
- Illegitimacy in fiction
