= List of lesbian fiction =

This is a list of lesbian-themed fiction. It includes books and plays. The lists of adult and of YA-appropriate works are split into separate headings.

To keep this list a manageable length, the list is confined to those works and authors who have been notable enough to merit Wikipedia pages in their own right.

Below the main list, the article also includes:

- information on particularly prolific publishing subcultures like fanfiction and mysteries;
- a list of lesbian and feminist publishing houses; and
- a list of nonfiction works on this topic.

== Works of lesbian fiction, in chronological order ==
=== Pre-1700 ===
- Symposium. By Plato. c. 300s BC. (There's a story about how all soulmate couples, including female-female couples, used to be joined into one two-faced body.) (Note: "[H]e begins by treating of the origin of human nature. The sexes were originally three, men, women, and the union of the two; and they were made round—having four hands, four feet, two faces on a round neck, and the rest to correspond. Terrible was their strength and swiftness; and they were essaying to scale heaven and attack the gods. Doubt reigned in the celestial councils; the gods were divided between the desire of quelling the pride of man and the fear of losing the sacrifices. At last Zeus hit upon an expedient. Let us cut them in two, he said; then they will only have half their strength, and we shall have twice as many sacrifices. He spake, and split them as you might split an egg with an hair; and when this was done, he told Apollo to give their faces a twist and re-arrange their persons, taking out the wrinkles and tying the skin in a knot about the navel. The two halves went about looking for one another, and were ready to die of hunger in one another's arms. Then Zeus invented an adjustment of the sexes, which enabled them to marry and go their way to the business of life. Now the characters of men differ accordingly as they are derived from the original man or the original woman, or the original man-woman. Those who come from the man-woman are lascivious and adulterous; those who come from the woman form female attachments; those who are a section of the male follow the male and embrace him, and in him all their desires centre.")
- Dialogues of the Courtesans. By Lucian of Samosata. c. 100s AD. (A character Leaina confesses to having a relationship with another woman, Megilla.)
- Epigrams. By Martial. c. 100s AD. (Contains satirical poems about a masculine lesbian character named Philaenis.)
- Waga mi ni tadoru himegimi (Japanese: わが身にたどる姫君) (The Princess in Search of Herself). Author unknown. c.1259-1276. (A passage in volume 6 describes a former priestess and her lady-in-waiting having sex.)

=== 1700-1799 ===
- Fanny Hill. By John Cleland. 1748. (Fanny has an encounter with Phoebe, a prostitute)
- La Religieuse. By Denis Diderot. 1796. (A Reverend Mother wants to seduce a nun.)
- L'Espion Anglais. 1778.

=== 1800-1899 ===
- Mademoiselle Maupin. By Théophile Gautier. 1835. (A fiction work inspired by Julie d'Aubigny, who had relationships with both women and men.)
- La Fille aux yeux d'or. By Honoré de Balzac. 1835.
- Carmilla. By Sheridan Le Fanu. 1872.
- Der Liebe Lust und Leid der Frau zur Frau. Author unknown. 1895. (The only known exemplar is in the Berlin State Library (RVKO number Yx 27911)).
- Nana. By Émile Zola. 1880. (An extended description of Chez Laure, a Parisian restaurant that caters to a lesbian clientele; the relationship of Nana and the unfaithful Satin, "with her blue eyes and schoolgirlish look", "bitten and beaten and torn this way and that by the two women".)
- Mademoiselle Giraud, My Wife. By Adolphe Belot. 1891.
- Phoenixes Flying Together (凤双飞; 鳳雙飛; Fèng Shuāngfēi), by Cheng Huiying (程蕙英). 1899.

=== 1900-1949 ===
- Sind es Frauen? Roman über das dritte Geschlecht. By Minna Wettstein-Adelt. 1901.
- God of Vengeance. By Sholem Asch. 1906. (A Yiddish play where a married woman falls in love with a prostitute her father is pimping out. First lesbian kiss on an American theater stage.)
- Thirty-Three Abominations. By Lydia Zinovieva-Annibal. 1907.
- The Rainbow. By D. H. Lawrence. 1915. (In the chapter "Shame", Ursula has an affair with another woman, Winifred.)
- 花物語 (Hana Monogatari, "Flower Tales"). By Nobuko Yoshiya. 1916–1925. (Short stories.)
- Regiment of Women. By Winifred Ashton (under the pseudonym Clemence Dane. 1917.
- The Scorpion. Anna Elisabet Weirauch. 1919. (1930) (1931)
- 屋根裏の二處女 (Yaneura no Nishojo, "Two Virgins in the Attic"). By Nobuko Yoshiya. 1920.
- The Bachelor Girl. By Victor Margueritte. 1922.
- Freundinnen. By Maximiliane Ackers. 1923.
- Anja und Esther (play). By Klaus Mann. 1925.
- The Captive (play). By Edouard Bourdet. 1926. (Tragedy of a young woman who falls into a twisted relationship with another woman.)
- Vestal Fire. By Compton Mackenzie. 1927. (Male main character is invited on a trip to Capri by a lesbian couple, Miss Virginia and Maimie Pepworth-Norton.)
- The Well of Loneliness. By Radclyffe Hall. 1928. (Subject of an obscenity trial that banned the book in the United Kingdom until 1949, though "there are no descriptions of sex in it, no rude words, and the lesbian lovers do not live happily ever after".)
- Ladies Almanack. By Djuna Barnes. 1928.
- Orlando: A Biography. By Virginia Woolf. 1928.
- Extraordinary Women. By Compton Mackenzie. 1928.
- Paying Guests. By E. F. Benson. 1929. (The happy ending revolves around a lesbian and a bisexual moving in together after the bisexual rejects a marriage proposal from a man.)
- Kariera Nikodema Dyzmy. By Tadeusz Dołęga-Mostowicz. 1931. (A lesbian character has an affair with her father's wife. The wife eventually marries the main character, but there is no question of the lesbian feeling any sentiments towards a man.)
- The Autobiography of Alice B. Toklas. By Gertrude Stein. 1933. (One of Stein's more accessible works. Others, whose lesbian content may not be apparent to the uninformed reader, include As a Wife Has a Cow: A Love Story and Lifting Belly.)
- The Child Manuela. By Christa Winsloe. 1933.
- The Children's Hour (play). By Lillian Hellman. 1934.
- We Too Are Drifting. By Gale Wilhelm. 1935.
- Nightwood. By Djuna Barnes. 1936.
- Lulu. By Alban Berg. 1937.
- Young Man with a Horn. By Dorothy Baker. 1938. (Amy has a relationship with the singer Josephine Jordan.)
- Torchlight to Valhalla. By Gale Wilhelm. 1938.
- The Friendly Young Ladies. By Mary Renault. 1943.
- Two Serious Ladies. By Jane Bowles. 1943.
- No Exit. By Jean-Paul Sartre. 1944. (Inès Serrano, a lesbian, is sent to Hell for murder.)

=== 1950-1999 ===
- Women's Barracks. By Tereska Torres. 1950. (Credited as the first US paperback-original bestseller. Its popularity prompted the formation of the House Select Committee on Current Pornographic Materials in the United States.)
- Spring Fire. By Marijane Meaker (as Vin Packer). 1952.
- Le Rempart des Béguines. By Françoise Mallet-Joris. 1951. Translated as The Illusionist. 1952. (Helene, a 15-year-old schoolgirl, is seduced by her father's mistress, Tamara.)
- The Price of Salt. By Patricia Highsmith (under the pseudonym "Claire Morgan" before 1990). 1952. (Considered the first lesbian novel with a 'happy ending'; basis for the 2015 film Carol.)
- The Tree and the Vine. By Dola de Jong. 1954. (Portrays a reckless political journalist and a quiet woman in love in Amsterdam, in the years leading up to WWII.)
- Chocolates for Breakfast. By Pamela Moore. 1956. (Portrays the bond between the protagonist Courtney Farrell and her boarding school teacher Miss Rosen, and the backlash against them from other teachers and students.)
- Odd Girl Out, I Am a Woman, Women in the Shadows, Journey to a Woman, and Beebo Brinker (a.k.a. The Beebo Brinker Chronicles), Ann Bannon (1957–1962)
- The Girls in 3-B. By Valerie Taylor. 1959.
- Cassandra at the Wedding. Dorothy Baker. 1962.
- The Group. By Mary McCarthy. 1962.
- Winter Love. By Han Suyin. 1962.
- The Killing of Sister George. By Frank Marcus. 1963. (Basis for the 1968 film The Killing of Sister George (1968).)
- Desert of the Heart. By Jane Rule. 1964. (Basis for the 1985 film Desert Hearts.)
- From Doon with Death. By Ruth Rendell. 1964.
- The_Man_from_C.A.M.P.. By Victor J. Banis writing as "Don Holliday". 1966. (The gang the main character is investigating is headed by a lesbian nicknamed Big Daddy.)
- The Microcosm. By Maureen Duffy. 1966.
- Applesauce by June Arnold. 1966.
- A Compass Error. By Sybille Bedford. 1968.
- Patience and Sarah. By Isabel Miller. 1969.
- The Female Man. By Joanna Russ. 1970.
- Rubyfruit Jungle. By Rita Mae Brown. 1973.
- Loving Her. By Ann Allen Shockley. 1974. (Openly features a black lesbian protagonist and an interracial lesbian relationship. Widely considered to be the first published African-American lesbian literature.)
- Lover. By Bertha Harris. 1976.
- Cytherea's Breath. By Sarah Aldridge. 1976.
- Zami: A New Spelling of My Name. By Audre Lorde. 1982. (A biomythography, or autobiographical novel interweaving mythical and historical elements.)
- The Color Purple. By Alice Walker. 1982.
- Toothpick House. By Lee Lynch. 1983.
- Curious Wine. By Katherine V. Forrest. 1983.
- Daughters of a Coral Dawn. By Katherine V. Forrest. 1984.
- Oranges Are Not the Only Fruit. By Jeanette Winterson. 1985. (A fictionalized autobiography; a coming-of-age story. Follows a lesbian girl raised in an English Pentecostal church. Included in the GCSE and A-Level reading lists for England and Wales.)
- Mohawk Trail. By Beth Brant. 1985. (This collection of stories, poems, and anecdotes about families connected by blood, gayness, and poverty.)
- Mousson de femmes (Monsoon of Women). By Elula Perrin. 1985.
- The Swashbuckler. By Lee Lynch. 1985.
- Lesbian Body. By Monique Wittig. 1986.
- The Riverhouse Stories. By Andrea Carlisle. 1986 (Republished 2026).
- Say Jesus and Come to Me. By Ann Allen Shockley. 1986.
- Memory Board. By Jane Rule. 1987.
- Trash. By Dorothy Allison. 1988.
- The Child Garden. By Geoff Ryman. 1989. (This work by a gay male author features a lesbian protagonist. Winner of Arthur C. Clarke Award.)
- July Nights and Other Stories. By Jane Eaton Hamilton. 1991.
- Touchwood. By Karin Kallmaker. 1991.
- The Gilda Stories. By Jewelle Gomez. 1991.
- Ammonite. By Nicola Griffith. 1991.
- Send My Roots Rain. By Ibis Gómez-Vega. 1991.
- Six of One. By Rita Mae Brown. 1991
- Aquamarine. By Carol Anshaw. 1993.
- Bastard Out of Carolina. By Dorothy Allison. 1993.
- Stone Butch Blues. By Leslie Feinberg. 1993. (A fictionalized autobiography portraying working-class butch-femme culture, following a butch main character.)
- Chelsea Girls. By Eileen Myles. 1994.
- Empire of Dreams. By Giannina Braschi. 1994.
- Written on the Body. By Jeanette Winterson. 1994.
- Hadra. By Diana Rivers. 1995.
- Flashpoint. By Katherine V. Forrest. 1995.
- Slow River. By Nicola Griffith. 1995.
- Along the Journey River. By Carole LaFavor. 1996.
- Fall on Your Knees. By Ann-Marie MacDonald. 1996
- Memory Mambo. By Achy Obejas. 1996.
- Living at Night. By Mariana Romo Carmona. 1997.
- Sweet Bitter Love. By Rita Schiano. 1997
- The Passion. By Jeanette Winterson. 1997.
- Working Parts. By Lucy Jane Bledsoe. 1997.
- Hood. By Emma Donoghue. 1998.
- Don't Explain: Short Fiction. By Jewelle Gomez. 1998. (Short stories.)
- Coachella. By Sheila Ortiz Taylor. 1998.
- Summer Sisters. By Judy Blume. 1998.
- Like. By Ali Smith. 1998.
- The Hours. By Michael Cunningham. 1998. (A tribute to Virginia Woolf's Mrs. Dalloway, the novel depicts lesbian characters in the 1940s and 1990s.)
- Kissing the Witch. By Emma Donoghue. 1999.

=== 2000-present ===
- Stirfry. By Emma Donoghue. 2000.
- Doc and Fluff: The Dystopian Tale of a Girl and Her Biker. By Pat Califia. 2000.
- Tipping the Velvet. By Sarah Waters. 2000.
- Gun Shy. By Lori L. Lake. 2001.
- The World Unseen. By Shamim Sarif, 2001. (Portrays a relationship between conformist Miriam and rebellious Amina in South Africa.)
- Fingersmith. By Sarah Waters. 2002.
- Affinity. By Sarah Waters. 2002.
- Hotel World. By Ali Smith. 2002.
- Love Ruins Everything. By Aren X. Tulchinsky. 2002.
- The Wanderground. By Sally Miller Gearhart. 2002.
- Hunger. By Jane Eaton Hamilton. 2002.
- Fire Logic. By Laurie J. Marks. 2002. (And the remainder of the Elemental Logic series, which contain depictions of same-sex relationships.)
- Garis Tepi Seorang Lesbian. By Herlinatiens. 2003.
- The Salt Roads. By Nalo Hopkinson. 2003.
- Love and Other Ruins. By Aren X. Tulchinsky. 2003.
- Maybe Next Time. By Karin Kallmaker. 2003.
- Southland. By Nina Revoyr. 2003.
- Crybaby Butch. By Judith Frank. 2004.
- Love's Masquerade. By Radclyffe. 2004.
- Celebrating Hotchclaw. By Ann Allen Shockley. 2005. (Latest novel as of 2005 by noted novelist Shockley. Covers the inner workings of an HBCU with a lesbian plot.)
- Desert Blood. By Alicia Gaspar de Alba. 2005.
- Bliss. By Fiona Zedde. 2005.
- The Five Books of Moses Lapinsky. By Aren X. Tulchinsky. 2005.
- Daughters of an Emerald Dusk. By Katherine V. Forrest. 2005.
- The Walls of Westernfort. By Jane Fletcher's. 2005.
- Life Mask. By Emma Donoghue. 2005.
- The Empress and the Acolyte. By Jane Fletcher's. 2005.
- Fresh Tracks. By Georgia Beers. 2006.
- Of Drag Kings and the Wheel of Fate. By Susan "Smitty" Smith. 2006.
- Sword of the Guardian. By Merry Shannon. 2006.
- Snow Moon Rising. By Lori L. Lake. 2006.
- The Night Watch. By Sarah Waters. 2006.
- A Taste of Sin. By Fiona Zedde. 2006.
- Drag King Dreams. By Leslie Feinberg. 2006.
- Every Dark Desire. By Fiona Zedde. 2007.
- Gerhana Kembar, trans. Twin Eclipse. By Clara Ng. 2007. (Indonesian novel portraying lesbianism.)
- Flight Risk. By Kim Baldwin. 2007.
- The Teahouse Fire. By Ellis Avery. 2007.
- Among Other Things, I've Taken Up Smoking. By Aoibheann Sweeney. 2008.
- Beyond the Pale. By Elana Dykewomon. 2008.
- Hungry for I. By Fiona Zedde. 2008.
- Landing. By Emma Donoghue. 2008.
- Your Sad Eyes and Unforgettable Mouth. By Edeet Ravel. 2008.
- Branded Ann. By Merry Shannon. 2008.
- Girl Meets Boy. By Ali Smith. 2009.
- Lesbians Roaring Like A Tsunami. By Mikhail Volokhov. 2010.
- Un Soir du Paris. 2010. (The first Indonesian short story collection dealing with lesbianism. Twelve stories published to mixed critical reception.)
- Buyer's Remorse. By Lori L. Lake. 2011.
- Cinnamon. By Samar Yazbek. 2012.
- Misconceptions. By Erika Renee Land. 2012.
- Prairie Ostrich. By Tamai Kobayashi. 2014.
- Under the Udala Trees. By Chinelo Okparanta. 2015. (A girl growing up in war-torn Nigeria falls in love with another girl.)
- Bury Me When I'm Dead: A Charlie Mack Motown Mystery. By Cheryl A Head. 2016
- Weekend. By Jane Eaton Hamilton. 2016.
- Here Comes the Sun. By Nicole Dennis-Benn. 2016.
- Scorned. By Erika Renee Land. 2017.
- Death's Echoes. By Penny Mickelbury. 2018.
- This Is How You Lose the Time War. By Amal El-Mohtar and Max Gladstone. 2019.
- The Tiger Flu. By Larissa Lai. 2019. (Nominated for the Sunburst Award and Otherwise Award.)
- Punishment: A Love Story. By Eve Tushnet. 2019. (A novel featuring a lesbian parolee main character re-integrating into life outside prison.)
- Because I Said So. By Jane Eaton Hamilton. 2019. (Romance.)
- Gideon the Ninth. By Tamsyn Muir. 2019.
- Cantoras. By Carolina De Robertis. 2019
- Stay and Fight: A Novel. By Madeline ffitch. 2019. (A novel about a lesbian queer family trying to survive on the outskirts of society in Appalachia.)
- Between A Rock and A Soft Place: Selected Works. By S. Renee Bess. 2021.
- Bestiary. By K-Ming Chang. 2020.
- Skye Falling. By Mia McKenzie. 2021.
- Matrix. By Lauren Groff. 2021.
- The Jasmine Throne by Tasha Suri 2021, The Oleander Sword by Tasha Suri 2022, The Lotus Empire by Tasha Suri 2024.
- Gods of Want. By K-Ming Chang. 2022.
- Big Swiss. By Jen Beagin. 2023.
- Dance With Me. By Georgia Beers. 2023. (Won the 2024 Lambda Literary Award for Best Lesbian Romance.)
- Hijab Butch Blues. By Lamya H. 2023.
- Biography of X. By Catherine Lacey. 2023.
- The Safekeep. By Yael van der Wouden. 2024.
- Atmosphere. By Taylor Jenkins Reid. 2025. (Historical fiction; a romance between a 1980s astronaut and her girlfriend.) ISBN 978-0593158715
- The Isle in the Silver Sea. By Tasha Suri. 2025. (Romance.)
- Bury Our Bones in the Midnight Soil. By V.E. Schwab. 2025. (Vampire historical fiction.)
- Almost Life. By Kiran Millwood Hargrave. 2026.

== Young adult fiction ==
This section is intended for lesbian-themed fiction that is suitable in complexity and content for teenage readers. Since there is some variability in these individual judgments, a work being marketed under "YA" is sufficient to meet the criteria for inclusion. It can include novels, graphic novels, and plays.

- Ruby. By Rosa Guy. 1976.
- Happy Endings Are All Alike. By Sandra Scoppettone. 1978
- The Last of Eden. By Stephanie Tolan. 1980.
- Crush. By Jane Futcher. 1981. (One of the earliest examples of lesbian YA, this book portrays two girls in boarding school who are drawn to one another.)
- Annie on My Mind. By Nancy Garden. 1982.
- Death Wore a Diadem. By Iona McGregor. 1989.
- Lark in the Morning. By Nancy Garden. 1991.
- Deliver Us from Evie. By M.E. Kerr. 1994.
- Good Moon Rising. By Nancy Garden. 1996.
- The House You Pass on the Way. By Jacqueline Woodson. 1997.
- The Year of Freaking Out. By Sarah Walker. 1997.
- Dare Truth or Promise. By Paula Boock. 1997.
- Tomorrow Wendy. By Shelley Stoehr. 1998.
- Out of the Shadows. By Sue Hines. 2000.
- Empress of the World. By Sara Ryan. 2001.
- Finding H.F.. By Julia Watts. 2001.
- Keeping You a Secret. By Julie Anne Peters. 2003.
- Kissing Kate. By Lauren Myracle. 2003.
- The Bermudez Triangle. By Maureen Johnson. 2004.
- A Great and Terrible Beauty. By Libba Bray. 2004. (The trilogy gradually reveals a romance between characters Felicity and Pippa.)
- Good Girls Don't. By Claire Hennessy. 2004.
- Orphea Proud. By Sharon Dennis Wyeth. 2004.
- Sugar Rush. By Julie Burchill. 2004.
- Babyji. By Abha Dawesar. 2005. (Depicts the varying secret lesbian relationships and crushes of a dishonest high schooler.)
- Far from Xanadu. By Julie Anne Peters. 2005.
- The Will of the Empress. By Tamora Pierce. 2005.
- grl2grl. By Julie Anne Peters. 2007.
- The Rules for Hearts. By Sara Ryan. 2007.
- Split Screen. By Brent Hartinger. 2007.
- My Tiki Girl. By Jennifer McMahon. 2008.
- Pretty Little Liars. By Sara Shepard. 2008-Present. (A main character, Emily Fields, is bisexual and has a crush on her friend Allison and a later relationship with her neighbor Maya.)
- The Girl from Mars (Marsmädchen). By Tamara Bach. 2008.
- Skim. By Mariko Tamaki and Jillian Tamaki. 2008. (A graphic novel portraying a teenage misfit with a schoolgirl crush on a teacher.)
- Rage: A Love Story. By Julie Anne Peters. 2009.
- Ash. By Malinda Lo. 2009.
- Of All the Stupid Things. By Alexandra Diaz. 2009
- Huntress. By Malinda Lo. 2011.
- The Miseducation of Cameron Post. By Emily Danforth. 2012.
- Candlelight. By Sara C. Roethle. 2013.
- Afterworlds. By Scott Westerfeld. 2014.
- Tell Me Again How a Crush Should Feel. By Sara Farizan. 2014. (A closeted high schooler who already feels out of place crushes on a new fellow student.)
- Laura Dean Keeps Breaking Up with Me. By Mariko Tamaki. 2019. (A graphic novel portraying unhealthy and healthy dynamics of a high school aged lesbian's relationships.)
- The Stars and the Blackness Between Them. By Junauda Petrus. 2019.
- Last Night at the Telegraph Club. By Malinda Lo. 2021.
- She Drives Me Crazy. By Kelly Quindlen. 2021.
- The Lesbiana's Guide to Catholic School. By Sonora Reyes. 2022.
- Imogen, Obviously. By Becky Albertalli. 2023.
- Amelia, If Only. By Becky Albertalli. 2025.

== Modern lesbian fiction subcultures ==
In addition to the ongoing publication of lesbian novels, plays, and stories, several lesbian publishing subcultures have emerged in modern times.

=== Fanfiction ===
Fanfiction writers have produced many works in which female characters from fictional sources (such as television shows, movies, video games, anime, manga or comic books) are paired in romantic, spiritual, or sexual relationships. The genre is known by a variety of terms, including femslash, saffic, yuri and f/f slash. Lesbian content in fanfiction dates at least to 1977, but has become more popular during the 1990s and 2000s.

=== Mystery series ===
There is also a culture of mystery novels and series starring lesbian detectives. This includes lengthy mystery series by Kate Calloway, Cheryl A Head, Claire McNab, Mary Wings, Penny Mickelbury, Sarah Caudwell, Ellen Hart, Katherine V. Forrest, Laurie R. King, Manda Scott, Sandra Scoppettone, Lori L. Lake, J.M. Redmann, Amelia Ellis, Nikki Baker, Sarah Dreher, Stella Duffy, and Jessie Chandler, among many others.

== Lesbian and feminist publishing houses ==
- Alyson Books
- Aunt Lute Books
- AUSXIP Publishing
- Bella Books
- Blue Feather Books
- Bold Strokes Books
- Bywater Books
- Colbere Publishing
- Crossing Press
- Daughters, Inc.
- Dukebox.life
- Desert Palm Press
- Firebrand Books
- Intaglio Publications
- Kitchen Table: Women of Color Press
- Launch Point Press
- Naiad Press
- Onlywomen Press
- Press Gang Publishers
- Regal Crest Enterprises
- Spinsters Ink
- Supposed Crimes
- Virago Press
- Ylva Publishing

== See also ==
- Books
- Drama
- Lesbian literature
- Lambda Literary Award for Lesbian Fiction
- Lesbian pulp fiction
- Lesbian crime fiction
- Lesbian teen fiction
- List of nonfiction books about homosexuality
- List of poetry portraying sexual relations between women
- Literature
- Novel
- Young adult literature
- Yuri (genre)
