= S. Renee Bess =

American writer

S. Renée Bess
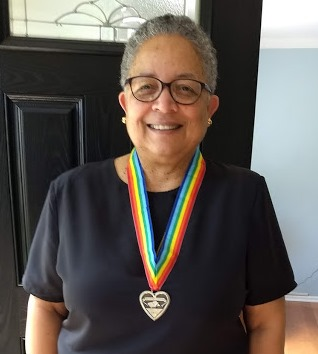
- S. Renee Bess, wearing the Alice B Medal Awarded in 2019
- Born: Philadelphia, Pennsylvania, U.S.
- Occupations: writer, novelist, teacher, anthologist
- Style: multi-ethnic representation, social themes, African-American culture, lesbianism, feminism, complex female characters, and family relationships
- Movement: Social Justice and Black Lives Matter
- Spouse: Vivian Lotz
- Website: www.reneebess.com

S. Renée Bess (also known as Renée Bess) is an American author from Pennsylvania whose writing focuses on multi-ethnic and cultural representation in literature, social themes, African-American culture, lesbianism, feminism, complex female characters, and family relationships. She is a retired Spanish and French teacher who has been writing for most of her life. Her writing has won a number of awards including a Golden Crown Literary Society “Goldie” for Our Happy Hours: LGBT Voices from the Gay Bars, a 2017 anthology that came about as a result of the massacre at the gay Pulse nightclub in Orlando, Florida. She serves as a member of the GCLS Sandra Moran Writing Academy Scholarship board. and is a long-time member of the Golden Crown Literary Society and the Lambda Literary Foundation.

== Biography ==
=== Early life and education ===
At the age of six, Renée was captivated by the plot of “Dr. Dan The Bandage Man.” She subsequently became enamored of Nancy Drew, the Hardy boys, and years later, Celie and Shug from “The Color Purple”. Books became a necessary part of her life, and writing became the natural corollary. Poetry, short fiction, and later on, novels flowed from her pen. She expects there are more stories eager to come tumbling forth.

In the late 1960s, Renée graduated from the Philadelphia High School for Girls, an integrated, all-girls high school in Philadelphia, then went on to Temple University outside Philadelphia where she earned degrees in education and languages. She spent her professional career teaching both Spanish and French full-time in a Philadelphia public high school and later worked part-time with student teachers at a local university while writing as much as possible.

=== Personal life ===
In March 2025, Renee lost her wife of 49 years. Renee continues to live in the Philadelphia area where she writes, edits, and advises other authors.

== Career ==
In 1994, a short story, "At the Beauty Parlor," won first place in a literary contest sponsored by Labyrinth Newspaper. Following that honor, two pieces of her short fiction were included in the Canadian LGBT anthologies, "Piece of My Heart: A Lesbian of Colour Anthology" and "Ma-Ka: Diasporic Juks." Bess is committed to writing artistic prose and filling her stories with multi-ethnic casts of characters, timely social themes, intrigue, and mystery. Leaning toward her predilection to create complex but realistic characters and using well-crafted language, she has been accused by one of her readers of "writing stories for the thinking lesbian."

She published her first full-length novel, Leave of Absence, with Borders Personal Publishing in 2005. Upon meeting representatives from Regal Crest Enterprises (now Flashpoint Publications) at a conference in 2006, she submitted her second novel Breaking Jaie to them and it was published in 2007. Three other novels followed, then the Our Happy Hours anthology, and most recently, Between a Rock and a Soft Place: Selected Works. In addition, her first novel was re-edited and republished in a new edition in 2013.

From the beginning of her writing career, Bess has been a proponent of writing about diverse people. In a statement at LezReviewBooks.com, she said: “It’s important for us to tell our own stories because we need to affirm our right to exist in the world and in the body of lesbian and gay literature…many times we are not only invisible to the non-black gay and lesbian community. We are invisible to each other.”

In a 2020 op-ed piece at Women & Words called “Excuse Me While I Burn a Few Bridges,” Bess urges all readers to take the time to discover Black voices, especially those of feminist and lesbian authors. She talks about how her second novel “was praised for its literary merit but rejected by a lesbian-owned publishing house because, ‘no one will be interested in reading about a black girl’s coming out.’ That happened only thirteen years ago, decades after the Jim Crow era.”

To talk about publishing and the place of writers in the world and to encourage people to read the writings of Black women, Bess had an hour-long interview with Lez Talk Books Radio in 2016. She and the interviewers, Dr. Stephanie Andrea Allen and Lauren Cherelle, discussed issues about racism, class, inclusion, diversity, and lesbian publishing.

In 2017, Bess compiled an anthology in remembrance of those killed during the 2016 Pulse Nightclub shooting in Orlando, Florida. She worked closely with author Lee Lynch who described the project as also being "about the role gay bars have played in our lives.” The collection, containing stories and poetry from 48 writers went on to receive positive reviews and the 2019 Goldie Award for Best Anthology from the Golden Crown Literary Society.

== Published works ==
=== Novels ===
- Leave of Absence (2005), second edition (2013) ISBN 9781619291065
- Breaking Jaie (2007) ISBN 9781932300840
- Re: Building Sasha (2008) ISBN 9781935053071
- The Butterfly Moments (2010) ISBN 9781935053378
- The Rules (2014) ISBN 9781619291577
- Our Happy Hours: LGBT Voices from the Gay Bars (2017) ISBN 9781633048133
- Between a Rock and a Soft Place: Selected Works (2021) ISBN 9781949096347
- Her Last Secret (2024) ISBN 9781619295698

=== Short works ===
- Driving Alone to P-Town is No Easy Thing, "Piece of My Heart: A Lesbian of Colour Anthology", Sister Vision Press (1991).
- At the Beauty Parlor, "Labyrinth Newspaper" (1994)
- TBA, "Ma-Ka Diasporic Juks: Contemporary Writings by Queers of African Descent," Sister Vision Press (1998)
- Long Story Short: a poem, "Our Happy Hours: LGBT Voices from the Gay Bars", Flashpoint Publications (2017)
- A Night Beyond the City Limits, "Our Happy Hours: LGBT Voices from the Gay Bars", Flashpoint Publications (2017)

== Honors and awards ==
- 1994 – Labyrinth Newspaper, First Place in the publication's Short Story Contest
- 2018 – The Golden Crown Literary Society Goldie Award for “Our Happy Hours: LGBT Voices from the Gay Bars”
- 2019 – Recipient of The Alice B Readers Award Medal of Appreciation
