= Birthday Deathday and Other Stories =

1985 short story collection by Padma Perera

- First edition
- Author: Padma Perera
- Cover artist: Katy Bailey
- Language: English
- Genre: Short story collection
- Published: 1985
- Publisher: The Women's Press
- Publication place: England
- Media type: Print (hardback)
- Pages: 178
- ISBN: 9780704328747
- OCLC: 16921690

Birthday Deathday and Other Stories is a 1985 collection of twelve short stories by Padma Perera, written and published from 1974 onwards. Eight provide vignettes of upper-class family life in India, while four others deal with cultural displacement and exile in North America.

== Contents ==
Birthday Deathday
The Schoolmaster
Letter
Appa-mam
Monologue For Foreigners
Too Late For Anger
Pilgrimage
Dr. Salaam
Mauna
Afternoon Of The House
Weather Report
Spaces Of Decision, South India, 1890s to 1970s

== Publication history ==
Individual stories first appeared in The New Yorker (The Schoolmaster, Too Late For Anger, Dr. Salaam, Mauna, and Afternoon Of The House), Helicon Nine (Spaces Of Decision), The Southern Review, (Birthday Deathday, and Eknath (Pilgrimage)), and The Illustrated Weekly of India (Appa-mam, and Monologue For Foreigners).

Nine stories (Birthday Deathday, The Schoolmaster, Letter, Appa-mam, Monologue For Foreigners, Too Late For Anger, Eknath's Pilgrimage, Dr. Salaam, and Mauna) were published in Dr. Salaam & Other Stories Of India, 1978, USA, Capra Press ISBN 9780884960898, with the twelve stories being published as Birthday Deathday and Other Stories, 1985, England, The Women's Press ISBN 9780704328747.

== Reception ==
Birthday Deathday has been reviewed by the New Statesman, World Literature Today, and Dr. Salaam by the Library Journal.
