= Victor Perera (writer) =

American academic and writer (1934–2003)

Victor Perera

Victor Haim Perera (1934 – 14 June 2003) was an American educator, historian, journalist and novelist, primarily concerned with Latin America and Sephardic Jewry.

He is known for his history of the Sephardic Jews, The Cross and The Pear Tree (1995), which traced the path of his own family from 15th-century Spain to 20th-century Guatemala.

== Personal life ==
Perera was born in Guatemala to Sephardic Jewish parents. After the end of the Second World War, the family left an increasingly dangerous Guatemala for Brooklyn, New York.

Perera studied at Brooklyn College, and went on to study English at the University of Michigan.

There he met, and in 1960 married, Padma Hejmadi, an Indian writer and artist and Hindu. The marriage, which caused a rift in his family, broke down in 1972, and Perera moved to California.

In his writing, he expressed his belief that his family was suffering under a curse for leaving Palestine two generations earlier.

After retiring, he co-founded Sephardic/Mizrahi Artists and Writers International, which sponsors the Sephardic arts.

In 1998, Perera suffered a severe stroke while swimming, and was largely forced to give up his writing. He had been working on a book about whales.

== Writing career ==
Perera's first job was as a fact-checker at The New Yorker magazine. Working as a journalist, he also taught journalism for twenty years at the University of California's campuses at Santa Cruz and Berkeley.

His numerous articles and essays were published by, among others, The Atlantic magazine, Harper's Magazine, The Nation Magazine, The New York Review of Books, and The New Yorker.

His writing included ethnographic work as well. With the anthropologist Robert D. Bruce, he wrote Last Lords of Palenque (1982), a first-hand account of life among the Lacandon Indians. In Unfinished Conquest: The Guatemalan Tragedy (1993), he collected oral accounts of the lives of modern Mayans, and of the murders of many of them by the country's army. These books helped enhance his reputation as a voice for the oppressed.

== Works ==
- The Conversion (1970), a novel
- The Loch Ness Monster Watchers: An Essay by Victor Perera (1974)
- Last Lords of Palenque (1982), an ethnographic study co-written by Robert Bruce
- Rites (1986), a memoir, republished in a new edition by Eland Books in 2011
- Unfinished Conquest: The Guatemalan Tragedy (1993), a history of Mayan persecution
- The Cross and The Pear Tree (1995), a family history

== See also ==
- List of American writers
- List of people from Brooklyn
- List of people from California
