= Sue Hardesty =

American writer (1933–2022)

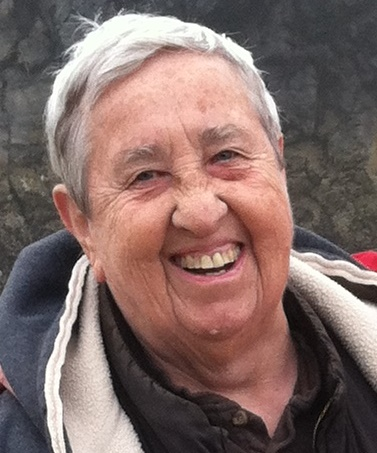
- Born: July 11, 1933; Buckeye, Arizona, U.S.
- Died: December 16, 2022 (aged 89); Newport, Oregon, U.S.
- Education: Arizona State University
- Writing career
- Subjects: Lesbianism, feminism, Southwestern United States, complex female characters, and family relationships
- Literary movement: Social Justice and Lesbian feminism
- Website: www.suehardesty.com

Sue Aileen Hardesty (July 11, 1933 – December 16, 2022) was an American author from Buckeye, Arizona, whose writing focused on plots and characters from the Southwestern United States, and social themes of lesbianism and feminism, as well as complex female characters and family relationships. She was a long-time supporter of the NOW (the Central Oregon Coast Chapter), the Rainbow Round Table of the American Library Association, PFLAG, the Golden Crown Literary Society, and the Lambda Literary Foundation.

== Biography ==
Hardesty was born in Buckeye, Arizona, and grew up on horseback in the desert area. Her mother was a prospector and a homemaker while her father farmed and ran a ranch. Hardesty grew up with a twin brother and two elder brothers. She graduated from Buckeye Union High School and went on to earn an undergraduate degree in English from Arizona State University followed by a master's degree in Communication.

Hardesty taught English and media in high school for twenty-seven years. She met her long-time partner, Dr. Nel Ward, in 1969 at Arizona State University. In 1992, they left the Southwest and moved to the Oregon Coast where they ran a bookstore called 14/Green Gable Books and two B&Bs and also rehabbed houses and re-sold them. For several decades she has been an avid photographer, especially of birds and wildlife, but she’s also furnished head shots for various authors, including Lee Lynch.

Hardesty was politically and socially active with the Central Coast chapter of PFLAG, with the local NOW, and with the community lesbian group (CLASS) in hosting potlucks and assisting with the monthly newsletter for the group. Hardesty and her wife, Nel Ward, were awarded the Lincoln County CAN award for their contributions to the lesbian community. She retired from all but writing, photography, and managing a guest cottage on the Oregon Coast near the Pacific Ocean.

== Writing career ==
With Nel Ward and Lee Lynch, Hardesty collaborated in the editing and publishing of The Butch Cook Book (2008). Reviewer Malinda Lo, at AfterEllen.com, wrote: "Cookbooks, especially those written by and for a community (like your local church’s cookbook) do a lot more than just collect recipes. They have a lot to say about domestic ideals, gender roles and even ethnic identity. They can be part of construction sexual identity, too...the butch cook book embraces lesbian sexuality, but from a butch-loving perspective." Julie Bindel wrote in The Guardian, "In the authors' world, any good butch will have a beautiful femme on her arm, who, every now and again, needs to be allowed to put her feet up." The collection won the Huffington Post contest called "The Most Unusual Cookbooks", and it made a brief appearance in the movie The Perfect Family.

Katharina Vester wrote about the cookbook in Volume 3 of Queers in American Popular Culture: “People loved its generosity, gentleness and great sense of humor.” Ilene Cooper, in a Booklist review, writes: "But this is more than just a witty cookbook. The editors envision the volume as a 'validation of who we are', and the personal stories that accompany the recipes (as well as the forays into lesbian history) are as comforting as the food."

Hardesty published her first full-length novel, The Truck Comes on Thursday: Book 1 in the Loni Wagner Series, in 2010 through Teal Ribbon Publications and a second edition through L-Books in 2011. The American Library Association's Rainbow Table Reviews wrote: "Plot twists, romance, hope, and despair all come together in this gut-wrenching, tear-jerking, hope raising tale of romance and mystery. This book is a wonderful addition to any romance or mystery collection as well as for those interested in reading about police work, Native American culture, and a touch of Arizona history."

The second book in the Loni Wagner series, Bus Stop at the Last Chance, came out in 2014. In 2019, Hardesty signed with Launch Point Press to reissue the first two books and publish the third and any subsequent books in the series.

A novel, Panic, about three teens who get lost in the Arizona desert, was published in 2013 and can be classified as a lesbian YA novel. After releasing Nine Muses: Open the Door to Let Your Muses In in 2020, Hardesty's last venture was the compilation of a book she co-wrote with her wife, Through The Knothole: Musings from Newport (2023) in which she was able to convey her love of Yaquina Bay, the ocean and coastline, and the development of NOAA and the Hatfield Marine Science Center across the bay. Sue said: “My joy was the view from the windows of our Newport home with all the boats and ships. I loved the town so much that it became my last project with my spouse, about our impressions, both facts and ideas, while we ‘mused’ on our lives.” She also indulged her love of gadgets with powerful binoculars and camera, “toys” allowing her to closely observe her surroundings.

Over the years, Hardesty served as a reviewer for the American Library Association's Rainbow Round Table, focusing specifically on works by notable lesbian authors.

== Death ==
Hardesty died of cancer on December 16, 2022, at the age of 89.

== Published works ==
=== Novels ===
- The Truck Comes on Thursday: Book 1 in the Loni Wagner Crime Fiction Series, first edition (2010), second edition (2011), third edition (2019) ISBN 9781633042070
- Panic, (2013), ISBN 9780979270161
- Bus Stop at The Last Chance: Book 2 of The Loni Wagner Crime Fiction Series, first edition (2014), second edition (2019) ISBN 9781633042094
- Taking the Long Road Home: Book 3 in The Loni Wagner Crime Fiction Series, (2019) ISBN 9781633042063

=== Other works ===
- Electric Media: A Practical Hands-on Media Guide, co-written with Nel Ward (1971)
- The Butch Cook Book, ed. with Lee Lynch and Nel Ward (2008) ISBN 9780979270109
- Nine Muses: Open the Door to Let Your Muses In, (2020) ISBN 9781633042995
- Through The Knothole: Musings from Newport, (forthcoming, Winter 2023) ISBN 9781633042339

=== Short fiction in anthologies ===
- A Fine Mess This Is, in "Lesbians on the Loose: Crime Writers on the Lam", (2015).
- Coming Home, in "Time’s Rainbow: Writing Ourselves Back Into American History" (2017)

== Honors and awards ==
- The Butch Cook Book, Bronze Medal, Gay/Lesbian Books, from the 2010 eLit Awards
- The Lincoln County CAN award for contributions to the lesbian community
