= Elizabeth Sims =

American novelist

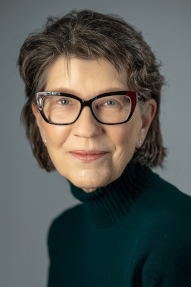
- Sims in 2025
- Born: September 30, 1957 (age 69); Wyandotte, Michigan, U.S.
- Education: Michigan State University; Wayne State University
- Occupations: Writer and editor
- Spouse: Marcia Burrows
- Writing career
- Genres: Nonfiction, fiction
- Subjects: Mystery, crime
- Notable awards: Florida Book Award; Golden Crown Literary Society Award; Lambda Literary Award; Tompkins Award for Graduate Fiction
- Website: www.elizabethsims.com

Elizabeth Sims (born September 30, 1957) is an American writer, journalist, and contributing editor at Writer's Digest magazine. She is a former correspondent for the Sarasota Herald-Tribune and author of two series of crime novels, including her Rita Farmer Mystery Series, originally published by St. Martin's Press Minotaur and Lillian Byrd Crime Series, originally published by Alyson Books.

== Early life and education ==
Elizabeth Sims was born on September 30, 1957, in Wyandotte, Michigan. She was raised in Detroit and attended Michigan State University and Wayne State University, graduating with degrees in English and composition theory. She is a member of the Mystery Writers of America, Novelists, Inc., and American Mensa.

== Professional background ==
In 1992, Sims began a two-year term on the editorial board of Moving Out literary journal, during which she submitted the short story "Beautiful" in 1987, and "Cleva" in 1989. In 2006, she began writing features for Writer's Digest magazine. She became a contributing editor in 2009, specializing in the art and craft of fiction. She worked as a freelance correspondent for the Sarasota Herald-Tribune in 2011. Sims taught creative writing at Sarasota’s Ringling College of Art and Design in 2017 and 2018.

Rita Farmer Mystery Series

In May 2008, she launched the Rita Farmer Mystery Series with The Actress. The main character, Rita Farmer, is a single mother and struggling Hollywood actress who is recruited to coach the defendant in a murder trial.

The Extra, second in the Rita Farmer Mystery Series was published by St. Martin's Press Minotaur in June 2009.

Sims moves the action from Los Angeles to Washington's Olympic Peninsula in On Location, published by Minotaur in August 2010.

Lillian Byrd Crime Series

The Lillian Byrd Crime Series is a six-novel series, originally published by Alyson Books (New York), beginning with Holy Hell in 2002. The series focuses on lesbian culture, mystery, and love. The second book in the series, Damn Straight, won a 2003 Lambda Literary Award. Lucky Stiff and Easy Street followed in 2004 and 2005. The main character, Lillian Byrd, is a reporter turned sleuth whose quest for true love takes her into dangerous places. The series, set mostly in the Detroit, Michigan area, is noted for its off-kilter characters and wry humor. The fifth novel in the series, Left Field, was published in 2014 by Spruce Park Press. It received a Golden Crown Literary Society award in 2015. The sixth in the series, Tight Race, was published in 2022 by Spruce Park Press.

Crimes in a Second Language

In 2017, Sims published Crimes in a Second Language, a departure from her series work. The novel, set in contemporary Los Angeles, features a white retired schoolteacher who befriends a young Mexican-American housecleaner. In 2018 Crimes in a Second Language was awarded the silver medal in the Florida Book Award general fiction category.

Bambi Pentecost Crime Novels

In 2025, Sims published Down to the D, as book 1 of a new series. In the novel, set in Detroit and Michigan's Upper Peninsula, Bambi Pentecost helps her daughter, Laura, solve a murder.

Public speaking

In addition to her writing, Sims lectures and presents workshops at writers' conferences and retreats around North America.

== Published works ==
=== Fiction ===
Rita Farmer Mystery Series

- Sims, Elizabeth (2008). The Actress, St. Martin's Minotaur, 336 pages. ISBN 978-0312377281
- Sims, Elizabeth (2009). The Extra, St. Martin's Minotaur, 400 pages. ISBN 978-1429987134
- Sims, Elizabeth (2010). On Location, St. Martin's Minotaur, 384 pages. ISBN 978-1429951272

Lillian Byrd Crime Series

- Sims, Elizabeth (2002). Holy Hell, Alyson Books, 270 pages. ISBN 978-1555836535
- Sims, Elizabeth (2003). Damn Straight, Alyson Books, 272 pages. ISBN 978-1555837860
- Sims, Elizabeth (2004). Lucky Stiff, Alyson Books, 243 pages. ISBN 978-1555838584
- Sims, Elizabeth (2005). Easy Street, Alyson Books, 229 pages. ISBN 978-1555839260
- Sims, Elizabeth (2014), Left Field, Spruce Park Press, 269 pages. ISBN 978-0692351772
- Sims, Elizabeth (2022), Tight Race, Spruce Park Press, 298 pages. ISBN 978-1733996747

Other Novels

- Sims, Elizabeth (2017), Crimes in a Second Language, Spruce Park Press, 266 pages. ISBN 978-1520300443
- Sims, Elizabeth (2025), Down to the D, Spruce Park Press, 344 pages. ISBN 978-1733996778

Short Story Collections

- Sims, Elizabeth (2015). I am Calico Jones: Four Short Stories, Spruce Park Press, 76 pages.
- Sims, Elizabeth (2018). Go-Go Day: Four Literary Tales with a Dash of Dark, Spruce Park Press, 73 pages.

Short Stories

- Sims, Elizabeth (1987). "Beautiful", Moving Out, vol. 13
- Sims, Elizabeth (1989). "Cleva", Moving Out, vol. 14
- Sims, Elizabeth; and Valerie Reed (editor, 2003). "For Faye", A Woman's Touch, Alyson Books
- Sims, Elizabeth; and Angela Brown (editor, 2004). "Play Money", Best Lesbian Love Stories 2004, Alyson Books
- Sims, Elizabeth; and Lake, Lori L. and Tara Young (editors, 2006). "I am Calico Jones", Romance for Life, Intaglio Publications
- Sims, Elizabeth; and Lake, Lori L. and Jessie Chandler (editors, 2014). "Untold Riches", Lesbians on the Loose: Crime Writers on the Lam, Launch Point Press
- Sims, Elizabeth; (2015). I am Calico Jones: Four Short Stories, Spruce Park Press
- Sims, Elizabeth; (2016), "Go-Go Day", Scene Magazine, August 2016

=== Nonfiction ===
- Sims, Elizabeth; and Ned Thomas (2007). Port Angeles Symphony Orchestra: Seventy-Five Years of Music on the Strait, Port Angeles Symphony Orchestra
- Sims, Elizabeth (contributor, 2010); and Editors of Writer's Digest. The Complete Handbook Of Novel Writing: Everything You Need to Know About Creating & Selling Your Work, Writer's Digest Books, 528 pages. ISBN 978-1582979588
- Sims, Elizabeth (contributor, 2012); and Editors of Writer's Digest. Crafting Novels & Short Stories: The Complete Guide to Writing Great Fiction, Writer's Digest Books, 368 pages. ISBN 978-1599635712
- Sims, Elizabeth (contributor); and Chuck Sambuchino, (editor, 2012). 2013 Guide to Literary Agents, Writer's Digest Books, 364 pages. ISBN 978-1599635972
- Sims, Elizabeth (2013). You've Got a Book in You: A Stress-Free Guide to Writing the Book of Your Dreams, Writer's Digest Books, 282 pages. ISBN 978-1599635545
- Sims, Elizabeth (contributor); and Rachel Randall, (editor, 2014). 2015 Novel & Short Story Writer's Market , Writer's Digest Books, 580 pages. ISBN 978-1599638416
- Sims, Elizabeth (contributor); and Chuck Sambuchino, (editor, 2014). 2015 Guide to Literary Agents, Writer's Digest Books, 363 pages. ISBN 978-1599638430
- Sims, Elizabeth (contributor, 2016); and Editors of Writer's Digest Books. Creating Characters: The Complete Guide to Populating Your Fiction, Writer's Digest Books, 342 pages. ISBN 978-1599638768
- Sims, Elizabeth (contributor, 2016); and Editors of Writer's Digest Books. Crafting Dynamic Dialogue: The Complete Guide to Speaking, Conversing, Arguing, and Thinking in Fiction (Creative Writing Essentials), Writer's Digest Books, 296 pages. ISBN 978-1440345548
- Sims, Elizabeth (contributor, 2017); and Editors of Writer's Digest. The Complete Handbook Of Novel Writing: Everything You Need to Know About Creating & Selling Your Work, Writer's Digest Books, 528 pages. ISBN 978-1440348396
- Sims, Elizabeth (contributor 2019); and Amy Jones, (editor, 2019). 2020 Novel & Short Story Writer's Market , Writer's Digest Books, 512 pages. ISBN 978-1440354939
- Sims, Elizabeth (contributor 2021); and Lee Child, (editor, 2021) and Laurie R. King (editor 2021). How to Write a Mystery: A Handbook from Mystery Writers of America, Scribner, 336 pages. ISBN 978-1982149437
- Sims, Elizabeth (contributor 2022); and Amy Jones, (editor, 2022). Children's Writer's & Illustrator's Market 33rd Edition, Writer's Digest Books, 416 pages. ISBN 978-0593332054

=== Poetry ===
- The Smudge literary journal – Spring 1978, Summer 1978, Winter 1978–79

=== Articles ===
- "Store Wars", LOGOS: Journal of the World Book Community, vol. 13, issue 2, 2002
- "Start Me Up!", Writer's Digest, December 2006
- "A Hollywood Hunt for Deep Background", Writer's Digest, December 2007
- "Face-to-Face with an Agent", Writer's Digest, August 2008
- "Rough It Up", Writer's Digest, February 2009
- "What Not to Expect When You're Expecting", Writer's Digest, July 2009
- "A Notebook, a PT Cruiser, and a Week In L.A.", Mystery Readers Journal: Los Angeles Mysteries I, Summer 2009
- "How Even a Bad Conference Can Make You a Better Writer", Writer's Digest, October 2009
- "How to Make Your Novel a Page Turner", Writer's Digest, January 2010
- "Handsell Your Book: 10 Simple Steps", Writer's Digest, March/April 2010
- "Write This, Not That", Writer's Digest, May/June 2010
- "10-Minute Fixes to 10 Common Plot Problems", Writer's Digest, the BIG 10 issue, September 2010
- "On the Loose in LA", Crimespree Magazine, #38 September/October 2010
- "8 Ways to Write a 5-Star Chapter One", Writer's Digest, January 2011
- "It's All Relative", Writer's Digest, February 2011
- "The Long and Short of It", Writer's Digest, March/April 2011
- "How to Gain Perspective on Your Work", Writer's Digest, July/August 2011
- "10 Things for Every Writer's Bucket List", Writer's Digest, September 2011
- "Fan Out!", Writer's Digest, October 2011
- "Spin Subplots Like a Master Weaver", Writer's Digest, November/December 2011
- "Namedropping: Craft Perfect Names for Your Characters", Writer's Digest, January 2012
- "7 Simple Ways to Make a Good Story Great", Writer's Digest, March/April 2012
- "The Reluctant Risk-Taker's Guide to Filling the Creative Well", Writer's Digest, July/August 2012
- "10 Fast Hacks for Fiction Writers", Writer's Digest, September 2012
- "How to Develop Any Idea Into a Great Story", Writer's Digest, December 2012
- "Master Description Through Sensory Detail", Writer's Digest, January 2013
- "True Story", Writer's Digest, March/April 2013
- "Breaking Bad", Writer's Digest, May/June 2013
- "Going Public", Writer's Digest, September 2013
- "Transform Your Novel into a Symphony", Writer's Digest, November/December 2013
- "Miscalculations and Missteps", Writer's Digest, January 2014
- "Mapping Out Your Hero's Adventure", Writer's Digest, February 2014
- "Finding the Funny in Fiction", Writer's Digest, June 2014
- "Shelf Savvy", Writer's Digest, September 2014
- "21 Fast Hacks to Fuel Your Story With Suspense", Writer's Digest, November/December 2014
- "How to Craft Flawless Dialogue", Writer's Digest, January 2015
- "15 Hacks for Characterizing Fast", Writer's Digest, May/June 2015
- "What Real Revision Looks Like", Writer's Digest, September 2015
- "Make a New Commitment to Your Writing", Writer's Digest, November/December 2015 and Writing Basics 2016
- "Characterizing Quick", Writer's Digest, Novel Writing 2015 Yearbook
- "Power Tools", Writer's Digest, January 2016
- "It’s the Little Things", Writer's Digest, September 2016
- "21 Ways to Pivot Your Plot", Writer's Digest, January 2017
- "Stepping Up Your Sidekicks", Writer's Digest, February 2017
- "Knock 'em Dead", Writer's Digest, March/April 2017
- "The Lake Effect", Mystery Readers Journal: Midwestern Mysteries, Volume 33, No. 1, Spring 2017
- "Fiction Lab", Writer's Digest, September 2017
- "Should You Go There?", Writer's Digest, January 2018
- "Funny People", Writer's Digest, July/August 2018
- "The Pen is Mightier (Than the Word Processor)", Writer's Digest, November/December 2018
- "Writing Queer", Writer's Digest, February 2019
- "Plotting Your Way", Writer's Digest, September 2019
- "Truth and Consequences", Writer's Digest, November/December 2019
- "The Frugal Writer’s Guide to Everything", Writer's Digest, March 2020
- "Creating a Writing Retreat for One", Writer's Digest, July/August 2020
- "100 Ways to Buff Your Book", Writer's Digest, November/December 2020
- "The Time and Energy Game: Maximizing Your Inner ROI", Writer's Digest, March/April 2021
- "The Quest for the Edge", Writer's Digest, July/August 2021
- "Behind the Curtain", Writer's Digest, November/December 2021
- "11 Writing Career Crossroads", Writer's Digest, July/August 2022
- "How to Write a Dynamite Last Chapter", Writer's Digest, November/December 2022
- "Writing Those Pesky Ratings, Reviews, and Blurbs Without Stress", Writer's Digest, May/June 2023
- "Building the Essential Linkages", Writer's Digest, July/August 2023
- "Los Angeles: Boundless, Disturbing, Inspiring", Mystery Readers Journal: Southern California Mysteries, Spring 2024
- "The Ecology of the Family", Writer's Digest, July/August 2024
- "Childhood: Our Touchstone for Wonder", Writer's Digest, September/October 2024
- "Bridge Characters", Writer's Digest, September/October 2025
- "Creatures of the Night", Writer's Digest, November/December 2025
- "The Pause is the Point", Writer's Digest, March/April 2026
- "Allegory in Action", Writer's Digest, July/August 2026
- "The 12-Minute Draft", Writer's Digest, November/December 2026

== Honors and awards ==
- Tompkins Award for graduate fiction – Wayne State University
- Writer's Digest – Short story fiction (1986)
- Lambda Literary Award – Damn Straight 2003
- Golden Crown Literary Society Award - Left Field 2015
- Florida Book Award Silver Medal – Crimes in a Second Language 2017
