= Luna (Peters novel) =

2004 novel by Julie Anne Peters

- The hardback cover of Luna
- Author: Julie Anne Peters
- Language: English
- Genre: Young adult fiction
- Publisher: Little, Brown
- Publication date: 2004
- Publication place: United States
- Media type: Print (hardback & paperback)
- Pages: 256 pg
- ISBN: 0-316-73369-5
- OCLC: 53880041
- LC Class: PZ7.P44158 Lu 2004

Luna is a young adult novel, by Julie Anne Peters, and was first published in 2004.

== Plot summary ==
Luna follows the life of sixteen-year-old Regan as she keeps the secret of her older sister Luna's transgender identity. During the day, Luna pretends to be an average senior boy named Liam. But at night, Luna is allowed to be her true self: Lia Marie, a girl. Later, she changes her female name to Luna, which means "moon", to reflect that her true identity could only be seen at night. After years of ‘transforming’ only at night, Luna confides in her sister that she wants to transition into a full-time female. Luna asks Regan to help her with her transitioning and, although she agrees, she finds herself worried about Luna and her safety. The novel follows Regan as she makes sense of her sister's decision.

Other problems arise for Regan as she is attending high school. She spends most of her life avoiding other students, in fear of letting the secret slip. But a new boy at school, Chris, becomes interested in her. Although Regan enjoys attention from Chris, she draws away from him, choosing to stay focused on Luna.

As Luna is coming out more, her father starts to notice differences in his child and tries to push a more masculine role onto Luna. Regan's father confides in her that he believes Luna is gay. Meanwhile, their mother remains oblivious to the rising tension in the household. Consumed by the workload of her wedding planning business, the mother is constantly out of the house and distant from her family.

Despite the tensions and the negativity weighing on her choice, Luna fights for her right to be the person she feels that she was meant to be. Alongside her, Regan learns to stand her ground, to think more of herself, and discovers the person she wants to be.

== Characters ==
Regan: The story is told from Regan's point of view. She is a 16-year-old sophomore in high school. She avoids other students in order to keep her "brother's" secret of being transgender, but holds a babysitting job with a neighboring family. She's a fan of Opera. When her "brother" decides to fully transition into a female, Regan supports her despite growing fears. At the same time, a new student named Chris takes an interest in her and despite keeping herself distant, Regan finds herself attracted to him.

Liam/Luna: Liam is an attractive senior in high school and the "brother" of Regan. During the day, she is a mild mannered student and computer programmer/builder. She runs a small business with her best friend Aly. However, she identifies as female and at night, dresses as her true self, a girl named "Lia Marie". At the beginning of the story, Liam changes her female name to Luna to reflect how she can only transition at night. As the story progresses, Liam comes to the decision of wanting to transition and starts to dress in public as Luna. With her sister as support, Luna makes the decision to transition and be the person she was truly meant to be.

Chris: Chris is a new student at Liam and Regan's high school. Regan first meets him in chemistry class and they become lab partners. Although he's new, he makes it onto the baseball team and becomes popular. Chris starts to like Regan although she isn't the most popular and distances herself from him. He tries to get to know Regan and date her which causes a conflict of interest within Regan.

Aly: Aly is Liam's best friend. Although they are close friends, Aly does not know Liam's secret and secretly wishes they were together. She works with Liam with computers and also hangs out with Regan. When Aly first discovers Liam's secret, she is mad and avoids Liam and Regan, but eventually comes to terms with it.

Jack (Dad): The father of Regan and Liam, Jack, works as a salesman at Sears. He has a set idea that men are supposed to be masculine while girls are meant to be feminine. Although he loves his children, he finds Liam's lack of athletic participation and other 'masculine' activities strange and thinks that his "son" may be homosexual. He doesn't understand the concept of transgender people and gets angry when Luna tries to tell him that, although born a boy, she was meant to be a girl.

Patrice (Mother): Patrice is the valetudinarian mother of Regan and Liam. After being a stay-at-home mom, she makes a career for herself as a wedding planner. She throws herself into her job, often ignoring her family and the problems that arise. Although she discovers Liam's gender dysphoria when he is young, she decides to ignore it. Although she outwardly neglects Liam when he gets older, she and Liam have a complex relationship with Jack. Patrice is aware that, should Jack find out about Luna, he will throw Liam out; she is otherwise not pointedly adverse to Luna. Indeed, Patrice humours Luna passively when she does not question the absence of her various medications though she is aware that Liam is suicidal, tells Elise, "I don't think that's any of your business," when it is inferred that, after she sees Liam as Luna, Elise calls Patrice to ask if he's mentally ill, and calls her doctor to ask for an early refill of her estrogen prescription (the book hints that Luna is on transsexual hormone replacement therapy using cross-hormones from her mother's menopause hormone replacement therapy) without questioning how the estrogen had gone. Patrice does not want Jack to find out about Luna because she is afraid of losing Liam, so she keeps Liam's gender dysphoria secret, and only clandestinely helps Luna. When confronted with the secret by Regan, Patrice admits that she 'can't deal' and continues to ignore her family as it falls apart.

== Minor characters ==
Hoyt Doucet: An upperclassman at Regan's school, Regan identifies him as a bully and shows anger towards him. He torments Liam often for being transgender.

Mr. Bruchac: He is Regan's chemistry teacher. Seen as sexist by Chris and Regan, he tells the girls they have to wear the goggles claiming that 'Chemistry is not a beauty contest.'

Carmen: Seen only in Regan's flashbacks, she was Regan's best friend before she decided to steer away from people. Sharing a love for Opera, they became close friends until they had a slumber party with a bunch of girls. Liam comes down to the party and accidentally lets Luna (Lia Marie at the time) out as he dances. The girls suspect him to be gay and in turn they 'drift away' from Regan.

The Matera Family: Regan babysits the three children of Elise and David Matera, neighbors of Regan's family. She sees them as the 'perfect family' and loves to baby sit for them.

Teri-Lynn: After Luna decides she wants to fully transition, she does research and comes across the story of Teri-Lynn, a trans woman who has fully transitioned into a female. She inspires and motivates Luna to transition and not back down from her choice. At the end of the novel, Luna goes to find Teri-Lynn for support as she transitions.

== LGBT content and banning ==
Luna is the first young adult novel to feature a transgender character, aside from Carol Plum-Ucci's What Happened to Lani Garver in which the main character may possibly be perceived as transgender. Peters introduced the idea that a transgender person may not be an extreme form of homosexuality as one may have previously thought.

The novel is part of the list of restricted/banned books of Texas due to the topics of gender identity and homosexuality as well as rough language.

== Awards and nominations ==
Luna has been nominated for four readers' choice state book awards, including the Vermont Green Mountain Book Award, Rhode Island Teen Book Award, Missouri Gateway Book Award, and the Michigan Thumbs Up! Award. In addition, it has won numerous awards.

- 2004 National Book Award Finalist in Young People's Literature
- 2005 Stonewall Honor Book, awarded by the GLBTQ Round Table of the American Library Association
- An American Library Association Best Book for Young Adults 2005
- 2005 Colorado Book Award for Young Adult Literature
- 2005 Lambda Literary Award Finalist
- 2004 Borders Original Voices Award Finalist
- Chicago Public Library Best of the Best 2004, Books for Great Teens
- Michigan Library Association 2005 Thumbs Up! Award Nominee
- Rhode Island Teen Book Award 2006 Nominee
- Missouri Gateway Book Award 2006 Nominee
- Vermont Green Mountain Book Award 2006 Nominee
- New York Public Library Books for the Teen-Age List 2005
- An Original Voices selection by Borders Books and Music. Original Voices recognizes innovative and ambitious books from new and emerging talents, as well as outstanding works from established authors.
- 2004 Book Sense Summer Reading List for Teens
- An ALA Popular Paperbacks for Young Adults

== See also ==
- Transgender and transsexual fiction
