= Between Mom and Jo =

2006 American young adult novel by Julie Anne Peters

- Author: Julie Anne Peters
- Cover artist: Roger Hagadone
- Language: English
- Genre: Young adult novel
- Publisher: Little, Brown and Company
- Publication date: 2006
- Publication place: United States
- Media type: Print (hardback & paperback)
- ISBN: 0-316-73906-5

Between Mom and Jo is a 2006 American young adult novel by Julie Anne Peters.

== Plot summary ==
The main character Nick has two mothers who conceived him through in vitro fertilisation, one of whom he simply refers to as Jo. Growing up, Nick gets along more with Jo than with his other mother Erin since they spend more time together and have similar interests. As he gets older, he questions certain aspects of his family life. Like the rift between Jo and Erin's family, or whether he will be gay just because he was raised by a same-sex couple. Meanwhile, over the course of several years, Erin and Jo begin to grow apart, ultimately separating by the time Nick is fourteen and Erin has an affair with another woman. After Jo moves out, Erin tells Nick that he and Jo can no longer see each other since she believes that Jo is too unstable. While Nick protests that Jo has rights, he finds out that since Jo never legally adopted him, she has no influence over visitation or custody. The separation causes Nick to go into a deep depression where he doesn't want to leave his room or be around people. When Erin confronts him about his behavior, he explains that even though she is his mother biologically, Jo has always been his real mom. Erin ultimately decides to let Nick move in with Jo in order to make him happy. By the end of the novel, Erin and Jo are on civil terms.

== Real-world context ==
This novel provides a story for readers searching for a maturation story along with those pursuing a novel evaluating patience, diversification, and LGBT themes.

== Awards ==
- Lambda Literary Award for Children's/Young Adult, 2007
