= List of poets portraying sexual relations between women =

This is a list of poets portraying sexual relations between women, who may include both lesbians and other WSW. The major poetic works depicting relationship among women are shown next to the respective poet's name in italics.

Notably, the word "lesbian" derives from Lesbos, due to the description of female homosexual love prominently featured in the poetry of Sappho of Lesbos.

== Poets and their works ==
- Adrienne Rich – Twenty-one Love Poems; Dream of a Common Language
- Amy Lowell – Picture of the Floating World; Two Speak Together
- Anna de Noailles – Love Poem; Book of My Life
- Audre Lorde – Cables to Rage, Martha
- Becky Birtha – The Forbidden Poems
- Carol Ann Duffy – Feminine Gospels; Love Poems
- Cherríe Moraga – La Guera
- Chrystos – In Her I Am
- Edna St Vincent Millay – Women Have Loved Before as I Love Now; What Lips My Lips Have Kissed
- Eileen Myles – Sappho's Boat; Irony of the Leash
- Elizabeth Bishop – North and South
- Ellen Bass – Mules of Love
- Gertrude Stein – Three Sisters Who Are Not Sisters
- H.D. (Hilda Doolittle) – Hymen
- Eaton Hamilton – Body Rain; Love Will Burst into a Thousand Shapes
- Judy Grahn – She Who; Love Belongs to Those Who Do the Feeling
- Kamala Das – The Descendants
- Kay Ryan – Erratic Facts
- Marilyn Hacker – Hang Glider's Daughter; Love, Death and Changing Seasons
- Mary Dorcey – Noise from the Woodshed
- Mary Oliver – Thirst; Night Traveler; Sleeping in the Forest
- May Swenson – Another Animal
- Mercedes de Acosta – Moods; Streets and Shadows; Archways of Life
- Michael Field – Works and Days (love diary); Poems of Adoration
- Michelle Tea – Rent Girl; Rose of No Man's Land; Passionate Mistake and Intricate Corruption of One Girl in America
- Monique Wittig – Women Warriors (a novel)
- Natalie Clifford Barney – Other Alliances; Indiscreet Souvenirs
- Nella Nobili – Les femmes et l'amour homosexuel
- Nidia Barboza – Hasta me da miedo decirlo
- Otep Shamaya – Little Sins
- Pat Parker – Child of Myself
- Renée Vivien – A Woman Appeared to Me
- Rita Mae Brown – Songs to a Handsome Woman; Venus Envy
- Robin Becker – All American Girl
- Sappho – Ode to Aphrodite
- Sarah Pinder – Cutting Room
- Sophia Parnok – Roses of Pieria
- Tapan Kumar Pradhan – Three Women in One
- Taslima Nasrin – Game of the Girls; Hunger in the Roots
- Trista Mateer – Aphrodite Made Me Do It

== Lesbian periodicals, journals and literary magazines ==
See List of lesbian periodicals

=== History and criticism ===
- Lesbianism in Germany: 1890s to 1920s. Lillian Faderman and Brigitte Eriksson.
- Passions Between Women: British Lesbian Culture 1668–1801. Emma Donoghue
- Odd Girls and Twilight Lovers: A History of Lesbian Life in Twentieth-Century America. Lillian Faderman
- Lesbian Texts and Contexts: Radical Revisions, ed. Karla Jay and Joanne Glasgow, New York University Press 1990
- The Literature of Lesbianism, ed. Terry Castle, Columbia University Press 2003

== Awards for lesbian literature ==
- Golden Crown Literary Society
- Lambda Literary Award
- Awards from the Publishing Triangle
- Gaylactic Spectrum Award (GLBT science fiction, fantasy and horror)
- Ferro-Grumley Literary Prize

== See also ==
- List of lesbian fiction
