= Padma Hejmadi =

Indian-born writer and artist

Padma Hejmadi is an Indian-born writer and artist, who has also written under the name Padma Perera.

== Life ==
Padma Hejmadi was born in Madras and grew up in India. She did graduate study at the University of Michigan, where she won the Hopwood Award For Fiction.

She has taught seminars and given readings at Vassar College, Columbia University and the Rhode Island School of Design, and has taught at the University of Colorado at Boulder. She has published essays and stories in magazines including The New Yorker, The Saturday Evening Post and The Iowa Review.

Her 1985 collection of short stories, Birthday, Deathday, collected twelve stories, written and published from 1974 onwards. Eight stories provided vignettes of upper-class family life in India, while four others dealt with cultural displacement and exile in North America.

== Works ==
as Padma Perera

- Coigns of Vantage. Calcutta: Writer's Workshop, 1972.
- The Challenge of Indian Fiction in English. Albany, NY: University of Delhi and the State University of New York, 1975.
- Dr. Salaam and Other Stories of India. Santa Barbara: Capra, 1978.
- Birthday, Deathday and Other Stories. London: Women's Press, 1985.

as Padma Hejmadi

- Room to Fly: A Transcultural Memoir. Berkeley: University of California Press, 1999.
