= Rage: A Love Story =

2009 novel by Julie Anne Peters

- Author: Julie Anne Peters
- Language: English
- Genre: Young adult novel
- Publisher: Knopf Books for Young Readers
- Publication date: September 8, 2009
- Publication place: United States
- Media type: Print Hardcover
- Pages: 304pp
- ISBN: 0-375-85209-3

Rage: A Love Story is a young adult novel by Julie Anne Peters. It was first published in hardback in 2009. The story follows Johanna who falls in love with Reeve who has suffered much abuse in her life. When their relationship struggles, Reeve begins to physically abuse Johanna who stays with her girlfriend despite the violence. The cover is a reference to the famous pop art image by Robert Indiana.

== Plot ==
Johanna is a senior in high school living in the apartment above the home occupied by her older sister Tessa. Both her parents have died and she has come out as a lesbian to her best friend Novak and her sister Tessa. A teacher ropes Johanna into tutoring Robbie, a boy with mild autism so he can graduate; Robbie happens to be the twin brother of Johanna's secret crush, Reeve Hartt. As Johanna tries to get closer to Reeve, she begins to experience some of the abuse drawn from Reeve's home life. Because Johanna believes she is in love with Reeve, she suffers through the violence of the girl she wants as her girlfriend.

== See also ==
- Lesbian teen fiction
