= Merry Shannon =

American author (born 1979)

- Born: June 12, 1979 (age 47); Sacramento, California, U.S.
- Education: University of Colorado Colorado Springs (BA)
- Occupation: Novelist
- Writing career
- Genres: lesbian romance fantasy
- Website: www.merryshannon.com

Merry Shannon (born June 12, 1979) is an American author. She writes lesbian romance/adventure novels and short stories published by Bold Strokes Books.

== Life ==
Shannon was born in Sacramento, California, and grew up in Texas and Colorado. She received her B.A. in English from the University of Colorado at Colorado Springs in 2001, and went on to a career in social work. She is presently a full-time social worker who writes novels in her spare time. Her first novel, Sword of the Guardian - A Legend of Ithyria was published in 2006 by Bold Strokes Books.

Shannon lives in Aurora, Colorado with her partner.

== Awards ==
Shannon has received two Golden Crown Literary Society awards for Debut Author and Speculative Fiction, and the 2008 Lesbian Fiction Readers' Choice Award for Favorite Adventure book. Her second novel, Branded Ann, was also a 2008 ForeWord Magazine Book of the Year finalist.

== Bibliography ==
Shannon has published two novels and three short stories with LGBTQ publisher Bold Strokes Books.

=== Novels ===
- Sword of the Guardian - A Legend of Ithyria, 2006 (Golden Crown Literary Society Award Winner, 2007)
- Branded Ann, 2008 (ForeWord Magazine Book of the Year Finalist, 2008)
- Prayer of the Handmaiden, 2015

=== Short stories ===
- "Rebellious Heart", published in the 2008 anthology Romantic Interludes 1: Discovery
- "The Whisper", published in the 2009 anthology Romantic Interludes 2: Secrets
- "Lucky Number Seven", published in the 2012 anthology Women of the Dark Streets: Lesbian Paranormal
