= List of women's presses =

This is a list of publishers dedicated either wholly or to a significant degree to publishing material written for, by, or about women. Many of them started during the "second wave" of feminism. The focus of this list is not on publishers which market to women, but on publishers who have a stated commitment to publishing feminist and other women's studies texts.

List of women's presses, with city, state or country location, and the year of their founding.

- 13th Moon Press (2009–?)
- Affinity Rainbow Publications
- Arktoi Books (2006–present)
- Artemis Press (2000–2012?)
- Ash Tree Publishing (Woodstock, New York, 1985–present)
- Aunt Lute Books (San Francisco, California, 1982–present)
- Ayizi Yayınevi (İstanbul, Turkey, 2010–2019)
- Bedazzled Ink Publishing (2014–present)
- Bella Books (2001–present)
- Belladonna* (2000–present)
- Black Woman Talk Collective (London, UK, 1983)
- BLF Press (Bloomington, Indiana, 2014)
- Bold Story Press (Washington, DC, 2020–present)
- Bold Strokes Books (2004–present)
- Boston Women's Health Book Collective
- Boudicca Press
- Brain Mill Press (Green Bay, Wisconsin, US, 2016–present)
- Bur Press (Lexington, Kentucky, 1942–1947)
- Bywater Books (2004–present)
- Caitlin Press (Sunshine Coast, Canada 1977–present)
- Calisi Press
- Calyx Press, Inc. (Corvallis, Oregon, 1976–present)
- Cleis Press (Berkeley, California, 1980–present)
- The Crossing Press (Berkeley, California, 1963–2002)
- Desert Palm Press
- Éditions des Femmes (Paris, France, 1972–present)
- fr:Éditions du remue-ménage (Montreal, 1976–present)
- Editions iXe (Donnemarie-Dontilly, France, 2010–present)
- Eiderdown Books: books on female artists (UK, 2018–present)
- Elly Blue Publishing (Portland, Oregon, 2010–present)
- Feminist Forum: Feminism in Japan and the World (Tokyo, Japan, 1979–1985)
- The Feminist Press (New York City, New York, 1970–present)
- FEMRITE - Uganda Women Writers Association (Kampala, Uganda, 1995–present)
- Flashpoint Publications (Ohio, US, 2018–present)
- Furore Verlag (Kassel, Germany, 1986–present)
- Gazing Grain Press
- Green Dragon Press
- Headmistress Press (2013–present)
- Heartspark Press, (Olympia, Washington)
- Héloïse Press, (Canterbury, UK, 2021–present)
- HerBooks Feminist Press (Santa Cruz, California, 1984–2002)
- Herself Press
- The HerStories Project
- Honno (Aberystwyth, Wales, 1986–present)
- Iowa City Women's Press (Iowa City, Iowa, 1972–1985)
- Inanna Publications (Toronto, Ontario, Canada, 1972–present)
- ISM Press
- Jan-Carol Publishing
- Josha Publishing (Haymarket, Virginia, 2020–present)
- Kali for Women (India, 1984–2003)
- Kelsey St. Press
- Kitchen Table: Women of Color Press (New York City, New York, 1982–1989)
- Kore Press
- KT Press (London, England, 1998–present), publisher of n.paradoxa: international feminist art journal and ebooks on women artists
- Launch Point Press (Portland, Oregon, US, 2014–present)
- Linen Press Books (Edinburgh, Scotland, 2007–present)
- Magnetewan Books (Vancouver, British Columbia, Canada, 2010–present)
- Midmarch Arts Press (New York, US, 1975–2018), publishers of Women Arts News (1975–1998) and Women in the Arts books
- Modjaji Books (Cape Town, South Africa, 2007–present)
- Monsters In My Head Press, publishers of the WorryWoo Series, Jersey City NJ, established in 2007
- Mother's Milk Books
- New Victoria Publishers
- Onlywomen Press (London, UK, 1974–2010)
- Pandora Press (London, UK, 1983–1996)
- Paris Press (Ashfield, Massachusetts, 1995–present)
- Persephone Books (London, UK, 1999–present)
- Perugia Press (Northampton, Massachusetts, 1997–present)
- Press Gang Publishers (Vancouver, British Columbia, Canada, 1970–2002)
- PublisHERstory ([Rome, Italy]), Roma, 2024- present
- Red Letter Press (Seattle, Washington, 1990–present)
- Scarlet Press (London, UK, 1992–1999)
- Second Story Press (Toronto, Ontario, Canada, 1988–present)
- Shameless Hussy Press (Berkeley, California, 1969–1989)
- Sheba Feminist Press (London, UK, 1980–1994)
- Silver Press (UK, 2017–present)
- Sister Vision: Black Women & Women of Colour Press (Toronto, Ontario, Canada, 1985–present)
- Spinifex Press (Melbourne, Australia, 1991–present)
- Sumach Press (Toronto, Ontario, Canada, 2001–present?)
- Switchback Books (Denver, Colorado, 2006–present)
- Tender Buttons Press (New York City, 1989–present)
- Third Woman Press (San Antonio, US, 1980–present)
- Upstage Left Press (Albuquerque, New Mexico 1978-present)
- Verlag Krug & Schadenberg (Berlin, Germany, 1993–present)
- Virago Press (London, UK, 1973–present)
- With/out Pretend (Toronto, Ontario, Canada, 2015–present)
- Women Unlimited (New Delhi, India, 1985–present)
- The Women's Press (London, UK, 1978–2013)
- Women's Press (Toronto, Ontario, Canada, 1972–present)
- Zubaan (an imprint of Kali for Women; New Delhi, India, 1985–present)

== See also ==
- List of English-language book publishing companies
- List of English-language literary presses
- List of English-language small presses
- Women's writing (literary category)
