= Our Happy Hours =

US LGBT anthology

Our Happy Hours: LGBT Voices from the Gay Bars
- Genre: anthology
- Published: November 2017
- Publisher: Flashpoint Publications
- ISBN: 978-1-63304-813-3

Our Happy Hours: LGBT Voices from the Gay Bars is a 2017 anthology that came about as a result of the massacre at the Pulse nightclub in Orlando, Florida. The anthology is curated by writers Renee Bess and Lee Lynch and contains contributions from LGBT writers from all walks of life. The anthology was created to give LGBTQ writers a chance to reflect upon the role of the gay bar in their lives and to express its importance to non-LGBTQ people.

== History ==
The massacre at the Pulse nightclub in Orlando, Florida brought LGBT club life into the public view. However, it became apparent that many people outside of the LGBTQ community did not truly understand the role that bars and clubs play in the community and how their importance evolved over the years.

When writer Renee Bess read Lee Lynch's blog, "Freedom Clothes", she noticed the historical descriptions of gay bar life mirrored the contemporary descriptions of the gay bar's role in the lives of LGBTQ persons. Despite the commonly accepted belief that the gay bar is a place of refuge and self-affirmation, it is also a place that offers different experiences to different members of the LGBTQ community. Bess felt it was important to have a discussion about the significance of the gay bar/club in LGBTQ culture. The idea of inviting writers to contribute their pieces of short fiction, slices of their bar-related memoirs, and their poetry to an anthology came to mind as a means of sharing the LGBTQ club experience with the world.

Bess asked Lynch, a revered member of the lesbian writers' community, if she would like to join her in inviting LGBTQ writers to create and submit original poetry, fiction, nonfiction, essay, and memoir pieces that explore the role the gay bar's culture has played in their life or the lives of the LGBT community.

== Publication ==
The "gay bar anthology" was titled Our Happy Hours: LGBT Voices From the Gay Bars and was published in the fall of 2017 by Flashpoint Publications. It also contains memoir pieces about gay life in the 1960s before the acceptance of the LGBT community within the mainstream society.

== Context ==
The anthology contains stories and poetry from over thirty LGBT writers that were influenced or inspired by LGBT bar experience and covers themes ranging from "fiery political birthplaces", "poetic reverence", and "points of resistance.

== Donation of royalties ==
The necessity of the anthology came as a result of the massacre and the fact the many LGBT youth are homeless. The curators felt the royalties from the book should go to help homeless youth. It was decided the royalties from the anthology will go to benefit the Attic Youth Center in Philadelphia and Ali Forney Center in New York City.

== See also ==
- Gay bars
- Violence against LGBT people
