= Tomorrow Wendy: A Love Story =

1998 book by Shelley Stoehr

- Author: Shelley Stoehr
- Language: English
- Genre: Young adult
- Publisher: Iuniverse
- Publication date: 1998
- Publication place: United States
- Media type: Print
- Pages: 176
- ISBN: 0-595-26954-0

Tomorrow Wendy: A Love Story is a teen novel by Shelley Stoehr published in 1998 and republished in 2003. Set on Long Island, it deals with a teenage girl's experiences with drugs and sexuality.

== Plot summary ==
Cary considers her head messy and keeps it hidden under her floppy Audrey Hepburn hat. Her best friend Rad — whom only she can see — speaks to her in only song lyrics. Not even her boyfriend Danny knows what kind of things go through her head. He is especially oblivious to the fact that Cary has strong feelings for a girl named Wendy.

Wendy has bright green hair and "hard-candy sadness in her eyes". Cary thinks that this sexy and mysterious girl could love her just as much as her boyfriend Danny does. The only problem, is that Wendy happens to be Danny's twin sister.

== Reception ==
Kirkus Reviews referred to Tomorrow Wendy as a "steamy tale of emergent sexuality". Discussing the novel's characters, they noted that the adults in the book are "negligent or completely clueless" but highlighted how the main character had a "saving sense of irony", as well as "a keen appreciation for love's ambiguities and complexities".

Publishers Weekly critiqued both the setting and character development, noting that the author's "depiction of privileged, nihilistic teens living life in the fast lane [...] appears more L.A.-ish than its Long Island setting might allow." Further, they found that the narrator's "rough language and hard-edged attitude toward sex can seem calculated". Compared to Stoehr's earlier novel's, however, they found that "the grittier elements of the story are in clearer service of a theme and message, and when the strands of the plot come together, the impact has force and vigor".
