= Jessie Chandler =

American novelist

- Born: August 16, 1968 (age 57); Grantsburg, Wisconsin, U.S.
- Education: St. Cloud State University
- Known for: Fiction, crime fiction
- Awards: Ann Bannon Popular Choice Award for Bingo Barge Murder (2012)

Jessie Chandler (born August 16, 1968) is an American author of mystery and humorous caper fiction, most of which feature lesbian protagonists. Her work includes the Shay O'Hanlon Caper series, as well as other novels and short stories. Chandler has presented talks about the craft of writing, serves as a mentor to many up-and-coming writers, and is a contributing member of the Golden Crown Literary Society, Sisters in Crime, and serves on the board of Mystery Writers of America.

== Early life and education ==
Chandler was born in Grantsburg, Wisconsin. She was primarily raised by her single mother, her father having died before she was born. She spent part of her early life with her grandparents in Siren, Wisconsin, then lived with her mother, a school teacher, in the Minneapolis – Saint Paul metro area until attending St. Cloud State University in St. Cloud, Minnesota, where she received a bachelor's degree in journalism.

== Career ==
A former police officer, Chandler has worked in management at both Borders Books and True Colors Bookstore in Minneapolis, previously known as Amazon Bookstore Cooperative.

Chandler writes Mystery fiction and caper crime fiction. Her work has been compared to that of other lesbian authors such as Elizabeth Sims, Ann McMan, and Joan Opyr.

A Mystery Lovers Bookstore review called her first novel a "winner" and "a delightful romp." Lavender magazine said: "Coffee, romance, murder, and dog all make for Minnesota nice-nice." In a pre-publication review, Library Journal listed the new book as "Truly Wacky," and Ellen Hart said: "Bingo Barge Murder is a solid first entry in the Shay O'Hanlon mystery series. Chandler writes with a wonderful sense of place, plenty of humor, and a crisp pace. The best part for me were the characters, which were so richly drawn that they felt like instant friends. This is a great read from the very first page!"

Chandler is a mentor and coach to new and aspiring writers, including through her work at The Golden Crown Literary Society, where she has judged the literary awards, served on conference panels, and provided T-shirts for the yearly conference. She is also a member of Sisters in Crime and Mystery Writers of America, for which she critiques unpublished authors. From 2021-2022, she served on the board of Mystery Writers of America.

== Awards and recognition ==
- 2012: Golden Crown Ann Bannon Popular Choice Award winner for Bingo Barge Murder
- 2012: Golden Crown Literary Society finalist for Best Mystery/Thriller for Bingo Barge Murder
- 2013: Independent Publisher Book Award winner (IPPY): GLBT Fiction for Hide & Snake Murder
- 2013: Golden Crown Literary Society Goldie winner for Best Mystery/Thriller for Hide & Snake Murder
- 2013: Golden Crown Ann Bannon Popular Choice Award finalist for Hide & Snake Murder
- 2014: American Fiction Book Awards winner (formerly USA Best Book Awards) for LGBTQ Fiction for Chip Off the Ice Block Murder
- 2014: American Fiction Book Awards finalist (formerly USA Best Book Awards) for LGBTQ Fiction for Hide & Snake Murder
- 2014: American Fiction Book Awards finalist (formerly USA Best Book Awards) for LGBTQ Fiction for Pickle in the Middle Murder
- 2014: Golden Crown Ann Bannon Popular Choice Award finalist for Pickle in the Middle Murder
- 2015: American Fiction Book Awards winner (formerly USA Best Book Awards) for LGBTQ Fiction for Operation Stop Hate
- 2015: Golden Crown Ann Bannon Popular Choice Award finalist for Chip Off the Ice Block Murder
- 2016: Golden Crown Literary Society Goldie winner for Best Anthology with Lori L. Lake for Lesbians on the Loose: Crime Writers on the Lam
- 2016: Golden Crown Ann Bannon Popular Choice Award finalist for Operation Stop Hate
- 2017: Golden Crown Literary Society finalist for Best Mystery/Thriller for Blood Money Murder
- 2017: Lambda Literary Award finalist for Best Lesbian Mystery for Blood Money Murder
- 2020: American Fiction Book Awards: LGBTQ Fiction winner for Quest for Redemption
- 2020: Alice B Readers Award

== Selected works ==
=== Novels ===
- Bingo Barge Murder: A Shay O'Hanlon Caper (2011)
- Hide and Snake Murder: A Shay O'Hanlon Caper (2012)
- Pickle in the Middle Murder: A Shay O'Hanlon Caper (2013)
- Chip Off the Old Ice Block: A Shay O'Hanlon Caper (2014)
- Operation Stop Hate: Book 1 in the Operation Series (2015)
- Blood Money Murder: A Shay O'Hanlon Caper (2016)
- Quest for Redemption (2020)
- Shanghai Murder: A Shay O'Hanlon Caper (May 2024)

=== Anthologies edited ===
- Lesbians on the Loose: Crime Writers on the Lam, edited with Lori L. Lake (2015)

=== Anthologies containing Chandler's short fiction ===
- "Fury" in Women in Uniform: Medics & Soldiers & Cops, Oh My! (2010)
- "Silent Night, Deadly Night" in Why Did Santa Leave a Body: Yuletide Tales of Murder and Mayhem (2010)
- "Sweet Spring Revenge" in Once Upon a Crime (2011)
- "Sweet Spring Revenge" in Lesbians on the Loose: Crime Writers on the Lam, edited with Lori L. Lake (2015)
- "Red Velvet Cake to Die For" in Cooked to Death: Tales of Crime & Cookery (2016)
- "Evolution of an Art Thief" in The Law Game (2016)
- "The Purple Monkey" in Happily Ever After: Romantic Stories by Bella Authors (2016)
- "The Pink Pussy" in Women in Sports: Hot, Sweaty, Sexy, Oh My! (2016)
- "Who Knew" in Conference Call (2017)
- "Mirror Image" in Learning Curve: An Anthology of Lessons Learned (2018)
- "The Secret Adversary" in Blood Work: Remembering Gary Shulze from Once Upon a Crime (2018)
- "A Rocky Road at Interstate Park" in Down to the River (2019)
- "Send Out the Clowns" in Save the Date: A Romantic Anthology (2021)

== Personal life ==
She was with a long-time partner for 28 years, but they parted in 2023.

She lives in Oregon.
