= Lori L. Lake =

American fiction writer (born 1960)

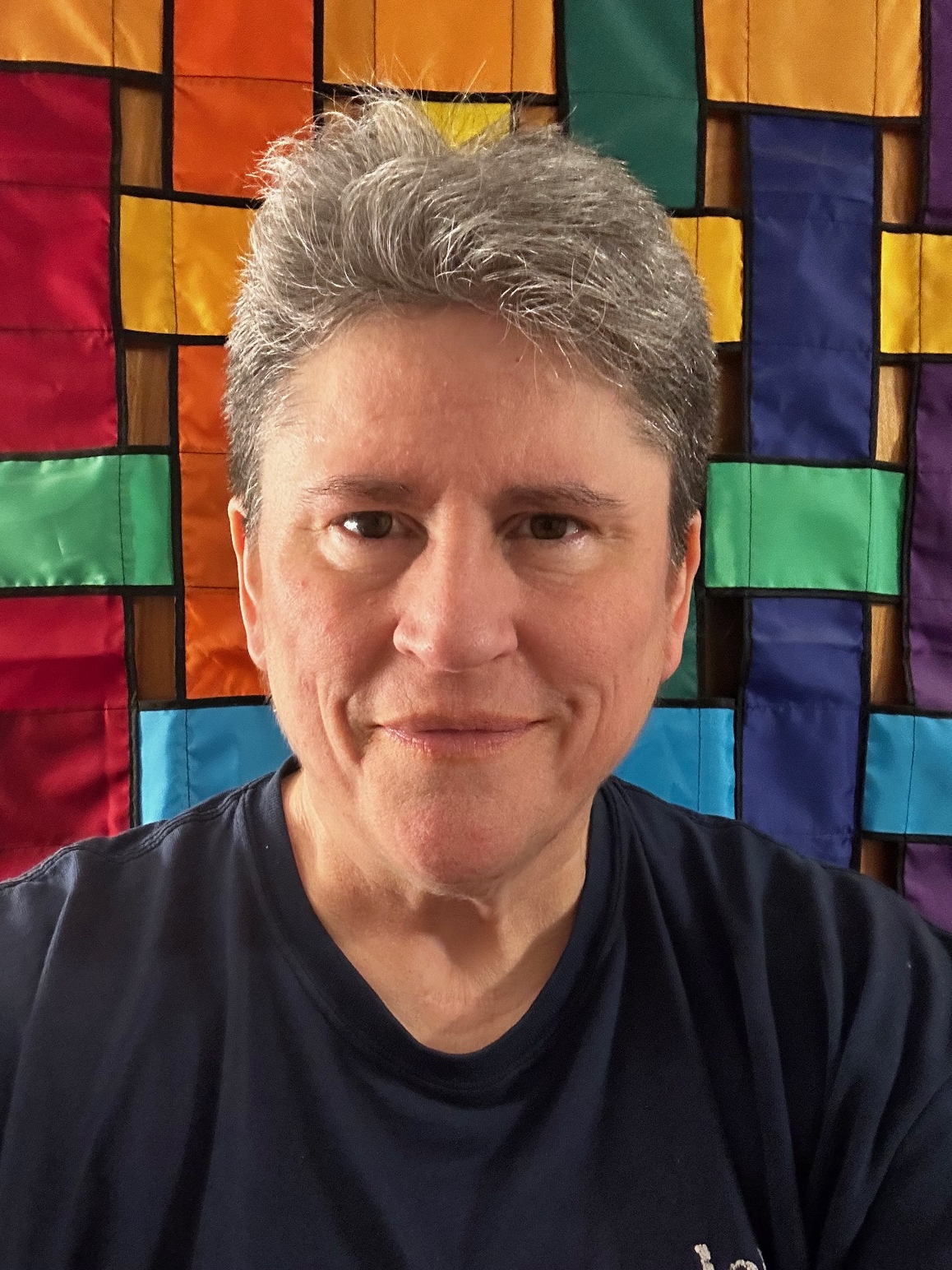
- Author, Teacher, Speaker
- Born: February 9, 1960 (age 66); Portland, Oregon, U.S.
- Education: Lewis & Clark College; Hamline University
- Writing career
- Genres: Fiction, Memoir, Short Story, Creative Writing, Nonfiction
- Notable awards: Alice B Readers Award, Golden Crown Literary Society, Rainbow Awards
- Movements: LGBTQ+ stories, human rights
- Website: www.lorillake.com

Lori L. Lake (born February 9, 1960) is an American writer of fiction, mainly about lesbian protagonists. She is also an editor, writing instructor, graphic artist, and former publisher.

== Personal life ==
Lake was born in Portland, Oregon, the oldest of five daughters, and spent her early years with her family in Seattle and Portland, then lived with an aunt and uncle in Tigard, Oregon, during her teen years and graduated from Tigard High School in 1978. She graduated from Portland's Lewis and Clark College in 1983 with a double major in English and Political Science and moved to the Twin Cities with her partner shortly after. She attended Saint Paul's Hamline University where she studied with Carol Bly and in 1989 received a Masters of Arts in Liberal Studies with an emphasis on Literature and Ethics. After working in Saint Paul in county government for nearly two decades, she quit in 2003 to work on writing and teaching. In 2009 Lake returned to her hometown in Oregon after a breakup with her partner of 27 years.

== Writing career ==
Lake's work includes The Gun Series police novels, The Public Eye Mystery Series, four standalone drama/romances, two short story collections, the Lambda Literary finalist anthology The Milk of Human Kindness, and the World War II novel Snow Moon Rising, which won the 2007 Ann Bannon Popular Choice Award, a Goldie from the Golden Crown Literary Society, and The Alice B Readers Award. In concert with fellow writer/editor Jessie Chandler, Lake also won a 2016 Golden Crown Literary Award for the anthology Lesbians on the Loose: Crime Writers on the Lam.

Lake has often cited author Lee Lynch as a big influence on her writing as well as Anne Lamott and Anne Tyler. In recent years, Lake has become a mentor and coach to many young and aspiring writers, especially through her work at The Loft Literary Center, the Portland Lesbian Writers Group, and the Oregon Writers Colony, and in her work as an organizer of writing retreats or as program director of literary conferences, particularly for the Golden Crown Literary Society from which she received the Directors' Award in 2011 for her co-founding the organization and coordinating conferences and events from 2004 to 2011.

Lake commenced publishing the work of others in 2014 upon opening Launch Point Press in Portland, Oregon. Citing time constraints, Lake sold Launch Point Press to new owners who assumed ownership in January, 2023, leaving Lake time to write once more.

In 2023, Lake collaborated in creating a new nonprofit lesbian literary organization called Opus Literary Alliance for which she served on the Board for a year and as the Co-Director of Education & Programming with Kim Dyke. Lake is also a member of Sisters in Crime, Mystery Writers of America, The Authors Guild, Poets & Writers, Oregon Writers Colony, Portland Lesbian Writers Group, Willamette Writers, and the Golden Crown Literary Society. She serves as administrator for The Alice B Readers Award.

=== Novels ===
- Gun Shy: Book 1 in The Gun Series (2001) ISBN 978-1-930-92843-5, (2019) ISBN 978-1-633-04005-2
- Ricochet in Time (2001) ISBN 978-1-633-04003-8
- Under the Gun: Book 2 in The Gun Series (2002) ISBN 978-1-633-04007-6
- Different Dress (2003) ISBN 978-1-633-04013-7
- Have Gun We'll Travel: Book 3 in The Gun Series (2005) ISBN 978-1-633-04009-0
- Snow Moon Rising (2006) ISBN 978-1-633-04021-2
- Like Lovers Do (2011) ISBN 978-1-633-04019-9
- Buyer's Remorse: Book 1 in The Public Eye Series (2011) ISBN 978-1-633-04015-1
- A Very Public Eye: Book 2 in The Public Eye Series (2012) ISBN 978-1-633-04017-5
- Jump The Gun: Book 4 in The Gun Series (2013) ISBN 978-1-633-04011-3
- Eight Dates: A Romance (2014) ISBN 978-1-633-04001-4
- Gun Shy: The 20th Anniversary Edition (2019) ISBN 978-1-633-04005-2
- Adventures Unlimited (forthcoming, 2026) ISBN 978-1-965-66112-3
- Sanctuary (forthcoming, 2027)

=== Short story collections ===
- Stepping Out: Short Stories (2004) ISBN 978-1-633-04023-6
- Shimmer & Other Stories (2007) ISBN 978-1-633-04025-0
- Serves You Right: Stories of Revenge, Reckoning, and Retribution (forthcoming 2026)

=== Anthologies edited ===
- The Milk of Human Kindness: Lesbian Authors Write about Mothers & Daughters (2004) ISBN 978-1-633-04027-4
- Romance For Life (2005) ISBN 978-1-933-11359-3
- Lesbians on the Loose: Crime Writers on the Lam (2015) ISBN 978-1-633-04031-1
- Time's Rainbow: Writing Ourselves Back Into American History – Volume I (2016) ISBN 978-1-633-04033-5
- Haunted by Her: Writers, Lovers, and Other Spirits (forthcoming, 2027)

=== Story contributions to anthologies ===
- "Take Me Out" in Silence of the Loons (2005)
- "Paige" in Best Lesbian Romance (2006)
- "Jumping Over My Head" in Toe to Toe: Standing Tall and Proud (2008)
- "Den of Iniquity" in Once Upon A Crime (2009)
- "The Penthouse Birthday" in Women in Uniform: Medics & Soldiers & Cops, Oh My! (2010)
- "Den of Iniquity" in Women of the Mean Streets: Lesbian Noir (2011)
- "A Darker Side of Green" in Writes of Spring (2012)
- "An Age Old Solution" in Minnesota Crime Wave Presents Fifteen Tales of Murder, Mayhem & Suspense (2012)
- "An Age Old Solution" in Lesbians on the Loose: Crime Writers on the Lam (2015)
- "Fighters" in Time's Rainbow: Writing Ourselves Back Into History (2016)
- "Kitchen Matters" in Cooked to Death: Lying on a Plate (2017)
- "Kindred Spirits" in Dark Side of the Loon: Where History Meets Mystery (2018)
- "Dog Eat Dog World" in Learning Curve: An Anthology of Lessons Learned (2018)
- "Writing to Wes" in Now We Heal: An Anthology of Hope (2020)
- "Missing the Boat" in Her Compass Was a Woman: Love Stories Inspired by Olivia Travel (2026)
- "Falling" in Haunted by Her: Writers, Lovers, and Other Spirits (forthcoming, 2027)

== Awards and recognition ==
- 2016 - Golden Crown Literary Society Award Winner - Fiction Anthology Category co-edited with Jessie Chandler: Lesbians on the Loose: Crime Writers on the Lam
- 2014 - Rainbow Award Winner - Best Comedic Romance: Eight Dates
- 2014 - Golden Crown Literary Society Award Finalist - Mystery/Thriller Category: Jump The Gun: Book 4 in The Gun Series
- 2013 - Rainbow Award First Runner-Up - Best Lesbian Mystery/Thriller: Jump The Gun: Book 4 in The Gun Series
- 2013 - Rainbow Award Winner - Best Lesbian Mystery/Thriller: A Very Public Eye
- 2013 - Golden Crown Literary Society Award Finalist - Mystery/Thriller Category: A Very Public Eye: Book 2 in The Public Eye Mystery Series
- 2013 - Golden Crown Literary Society Ann Bannon Popular Choice Award Finalist - A Very Public Eye: Book 2 in The Public Eye Mystery Series
- 2012 - Golden Crown Literary Society Award Winner - Mystery/Thriller Category: Buyer's Remorse: Book 1 in The Public Eye Mystery Series
- 2011 - Golden Crown Literary Society Directors' Award - For service to the GCLS 2004-2011
- 2011 - American Book Fest Fiction Awards (formerly USA Best Book Awards) Gay & Lesbian Fiction Finalist - Like Lovers Do
- 2007 - Golden Crown Literary Society Award Winner - Best Dramatic Fiction: Snow Moon Rising
- 2007 - Golden Crown Literary Society Ann Bannon Popular Choice Award Winner - Snow Moon Rising
- 2007 - Alice B Readers Award - Snow Moon Rising
- 2007 - LJ Maas Memorial Mentoring Award
- 2007 - Lesbian Fiction Readers Choice Award - Snow Moon Rising
- 2007 - Golden Crown Literary Society Award Finalist - Anthology Category: Romance For Life
- 2007 - Lesbian Fiction Readers Choice Award - Romance For Life
- 2006 - Golden Crown Literary Award Finalist - Mystery/Thriller Category: Have Gun We'll Travel
- 2005 - 17th Lambda Literary Awards Finalist - Anthology Category: The Milk of Human Kindness
