= Aren X. Tulchinsky =

Canadian writer

Aren X. Tulchinsky, formerly known as Karen X. Tulchinsky, is a Canadian novelist, short story writer, anthologist and screenwriter from Vancouver, British Columbia.

== Career ==
Tulchinsky has edited several literary anthologies of lesbian erotica. His collection of short stories In Her Nature (1996) was awarded the 1996 VanCity Book Prize. His novel The Five Books of Moses Lapinsky was a City of Toronto Book Award finalist and winner of the Vancouver Public Library's One Book One Vancouver Prize of 2008. It was named One of The Top Ten Books About Toronto, by the Toronto Star and is one of the top ten Canadian books ever borrowed at the Vancouver Public Library.

In addition to his published work, Tulchinsky is a graduate of the Canadian Film Centre. He has written six feature-length screenplays, a short film, an episode of the television series Robson Arms and the television film Floored By Love. He was story editor for the documentary series KinK, a story editor and writer on the drama series The Guard, a Story Editor on Glutton for Punishment (Food Network) and a consulting producer on Dussault Inc. and The Opener. He was Senior Story Editor on The Bachelor Canada and World's Weirdest Restaurants, and story editor/writer on Pyros, Timber Kings, The Audience, First Dates, Game of Homes and Border Security.

Tulchinsky has written several feature-length screenplays, including I Shot The Sheriff, to be directed by Clement Virgo.

His directorial debut is Ms. Thing, which has screened in 53 film festivals internationally, including screenings at Out On Screen Vancouver, Toronto Independent Film Festival, Cork Film Festival Ireland, Q Film Festival, ImageOut, Cinekink, Queer Fruits, London Lesbian Film Festival, Festival Del Sol, Pink Apple Mix Milano, and Frameline.

Ms. Thing was first runner-up at Out On Screen's Short Film Award, and WON Audience Choice Award at QueerFruits Australia.

Tulchinsky has written for numerous magazines and newspapers, including the Vancouver Sun, Quill and Quire, Herizons, Curve and Diva. He is the author of a monthly political column, "Homo Panic", for Xtra Vancouver.

In 2009, he served on the jury for the Dayne Ogilvie Prize, a literary award for emerging LGBT writers in Canada, selecting Debra Anderson as that year's prize winner. He has been on Vancouver Women in Film Festival's evaluation committee and a board member of the Queer Arts Festival. He has taught creative writing at Langara College and the University of British Columbia.

In 2019, his novel The Five Books of Moses Lapinsky was honoured with a permanent plaque in Christie Pits Park in Toronto, as part of Project Bookmark Canada.

== Selected works ==
=== Novels ===
- Love Ruins Everything (1998) Press Gang Publishers (2011) Insomniac Press
- Love and Other Ruins (2002) Polestar Publishing
- The Five Books of Moses Lapinsky (2003) Polestar Publishing (2010) Talon Books

=== Short stories ===
- In Her Nature (1996)

=== Anthologies ===
- Queer View Mirror: Lesbian and Gay Short Short Fiction (1995; with James C. Johnstone)
- Tangled Sheets (1995; with Rosamund Elwin)
- Queer View Mirror 2: Lesbian and Gay Short Short Fiction (1997; with James C. Johnstone)
- Hot and Bothered: Short Short Fiction on Lesbian Desire (1998)
- To Be Continued (1998; with Michele Karlsberg)
- Friday the Rabbi Wore Lace: Jewish Lesbian Erotica (1999)
- Hot and Bothered 2: Short Short Fiction on Lesbian Desire (1999)
- To Be Continued, Take Two (1999; with Michele Karlsberg)
- Hot and Bothered 3: Short Short Fiction on Lesbian Desire (2001)
- Hot and Bothered 4: Short Short Fiction on Lesbian Desire (2003)
