= Keeping You a Secret =

2003 young adult novel by Julie Anne Peters

- Author: Julie Anne Peters
- Language: English
- Genre: Young adult novel
- Publisher: Little, Brown
- Publication date: 2003
- Publication place: United States
- Media type: Print (hardcover and paperback)
- Pages: 250 pg
- ISBN: 0-316-00985-7
- OCLC: 59282187

Keeping You a Secret is a young adult novel by Julie Anne Peters. It was first published in hardback in 2003, and later in paperback in 2005.

The novel is about Holland, a 17-year-old girl, discovering her sexuality and what it is like to experience homophobia. What starts out as a confusing "girl crush" becomes a discovery of Holland's true feelings and coping with the concept of attraction to a member of her own sex. Other characters in the novel discover her crush and employ various means of physical and emotional abuse and violence, displaying strong homophobic behaviors.

Keeping You a Secret was a finalist for the 2004 Lambda Literary Award for Children's and Young Adult Literature and Stonewall Book Award.

== Reception ==
Kirkus Reviews referred to the novel as "revealing" and noted that "gay or straight" readers will "identify with the excitement that accompanies that first love affair. At the heart is the realization that secrecy can damage many relationships, no matter the connection".

Publishers Weekly wrote, "Peters [...] raises important points about the ramifications of coming out, but covers so much territory that her plotting suffers". They noted that some character development and action "seems too sudden", "comes across as extreme", or "feel[s] contrived". They concluded that "readers will appreciate Holland's new ability to live free of others' expectations [...] but the messages here seem to take precedence over plot".

Booklist also reviewed the novel.

== Awards and honors ==
Keeping You a Secret was a finalist for the 2004 Lambda Literary Award for Children's and Young Adult Literature and Stonewall Book Award. It was also included on the American Library Association's 2004 Amelia Bloomer List.

== See also ==
- Lesbian teen fiction
