= Erika Renee Land =

American poet

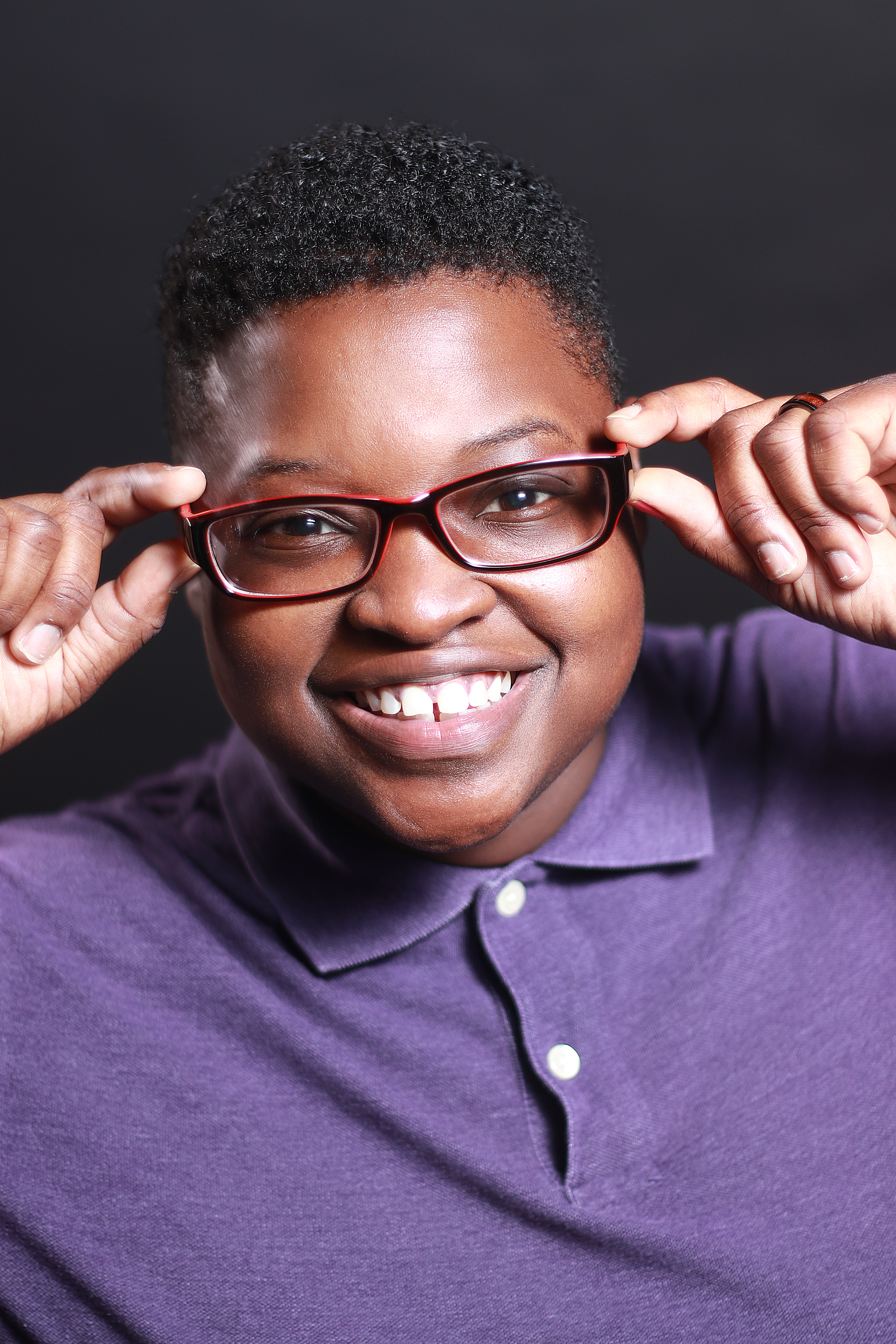
- Born: August 9, 1983 (age 43); Norfolk, Virginia, U.S.
- Other name: Lyrical Lunatic
- Education: University of Georgia
- Occupation: Writer
- Years active: 2012–present
- Known for: actress, poetry, public speaking, rapper, songwriter, writer
- Style: African-American culture, American politics, current events, everyday life, pop culture, race relations, racism, the Internet, the future, existentialism
- Height: 5 ft 2 in (157 cm)
- Spouse: Corrissa Land
- Parent: Renee Rhodes
- Relatives: Shelton Land
- Website: erikarland.com

Erika Renee Land (born August 9, 1983) is an American war poet, 2021 MacDowell Fellow, author, spoken word performer, and motivational speaker. She has published two poetry collections that chronicle her experiences as a pharmacy technician while helping the Global War on Terrorism efforts, several lesbian fiction novels, and academic articles.

== Early life ==
Land was born in Norfolk, Virginia, on August 9, 1983. She grew up on the corner of Tidewater Drive and Wall Street in the Barraud Park neighborhood. She attended 6–7 elementary schools in multiple states because of her stepfather's military service, then Azalea Middle School and Granby High School, both located in Norfolk.

== Army ==
After graduating high school, Land joined the United States Army, where she earned a Pharmacy Technician technical degree – MOS classification 68Q. She was stationed at Fort Leonard Wood for basic training, Fort Sam Houston for Advanced Individual Training (AIT), and Fort Lewis, before being deployed with the 47th Combat Support Hospital to FOB Diamondback in Mosul, Iraq, and finally Walter Reed Army Medical Center. Her decorations include two Army Achievement medals, the Army Superior Unit award, the National Defense Service medal, the Global War on Terrorism service medal, the Iraq Campaign medal with campaign star, the Army Service Ribbon and the Overseas service ribbon.

== Post-Army ==
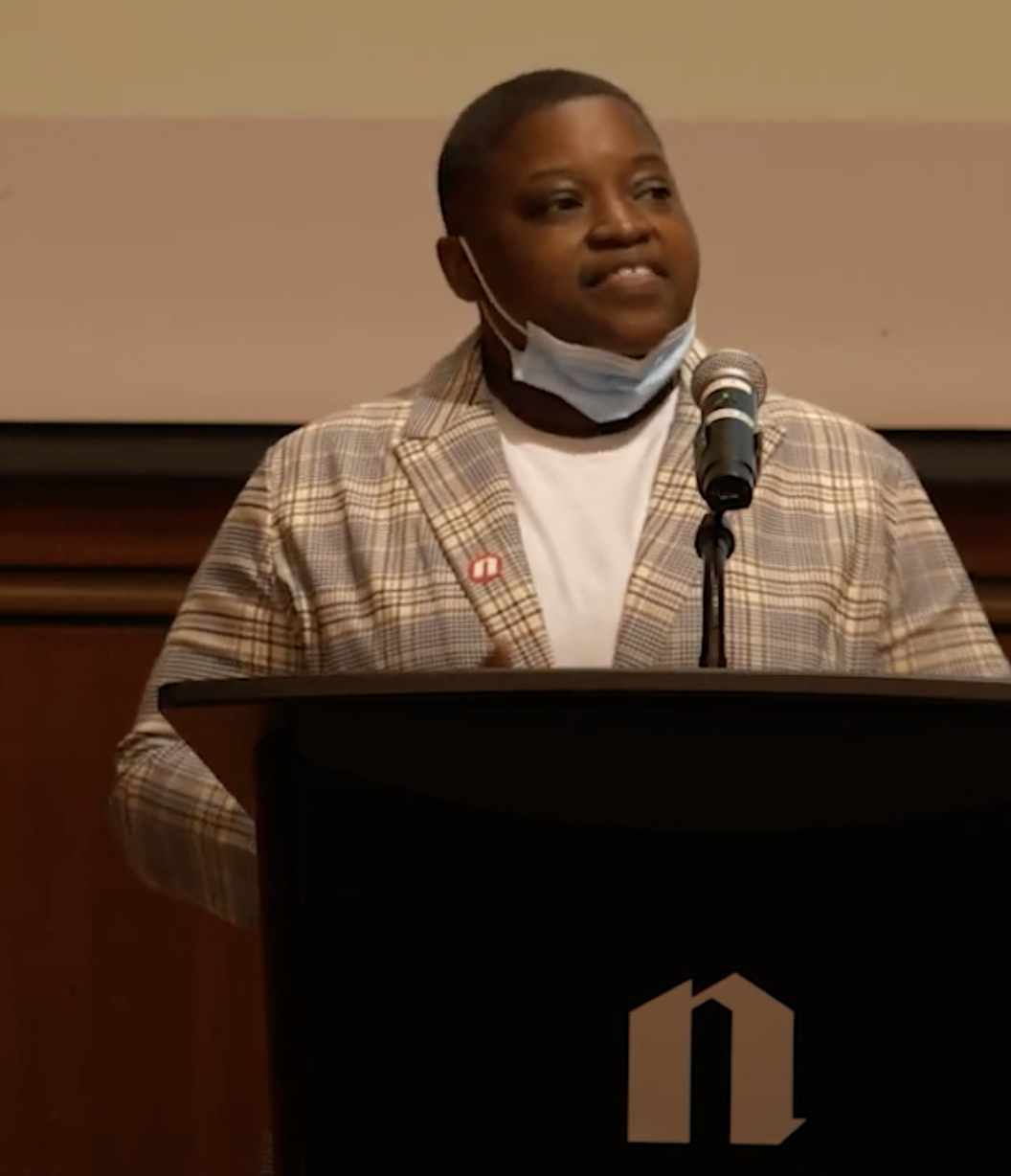
Land performing at the Newberry Library in Chicago during the Surviving The Long Wars Triennial

After returning from Mosul, Iraq in 2006, Land was diagnosed with post-traumatic stress disorder (PTSD). In February 2009, she was honorably discharged from the Army and moved to Athens, Georgia to pursue a career in pharmacy. Land lost her passion for pharmacy as she searched for ways to heal her PTSD. In 2023 she graduated from the University of Georgia.

== Poetry ==
Land embarked on a quest to educate the general public about PTSD by way of poetry. She stumbled upon poetry after she hearing a song that reduced her to tears, prompting her to write her first poem, "War Song". After publishing it and a few others, she pursued a degree in English from the University of Georgia. Her first poetry performance was at the Globe, a local pub in Athens, Ga. for Word of Mouth. She self-published her first collection, Residual Affects, with fellow veteran and photographer Katisha Smittick in 2013. With hopes of winning the 2016 Pulitzer Prize for poetry, Land republished a few of her war-related poems along with new pieces as the solo project Georgia's Dam.

== Personal life ==
She is a member of Sigma Gamma Rho sorority, Lambda Delta chapter.

== Television ==
Year	Title	Role	Notes
2018	Going RV	Herself – Buyer	Season 7 Episode 10

== Music ==
Year	Title	Notes
2018	"A Trip to Walmart"	Spoken Word EP released under Erika Renee Land
2018	"Squared L^2"	Hip-Hop EP
2019	"Energy"	Hip-Hop single

== Writings ==
=== Poetry ===
- Residual Affects (November 2013), co-authored with photographer KaTisha Smittick
- Georgia's DAM (October 2015)

=== Commentary ===
- of an Artist (April 2018)

=== Fiction ===
==== It's Complicated series ====
- Misconceptions (October 2012)
- Scorned (November 2017)

=== Articles ===
- "The Real Power Couples"
- "Mujer Power"
- "Huddle Up with the San Antonio Regulators"
