= Fiona Zedde =

American novelist

Fiona Zedde (born January 24, 1976) is the pen name of Jamaican-born American fiction writer Fiona Lewis. Her 2005 novel, Bliss, was nominated for a Lambda Literary Award for Lesbian Debut Fiction at the 18th Lambda Literary Awards.

== Background ==
Lewis was born in Hampton Court, Jamaica, in 1976, an only child to Dorothy Lindsay and Danny Lewis. At the age of twelve, she moved to the United States with her mother and has lived there ever since. She received an M.F.A. in creative writing from San Diego State University.

Zedde is the author of six novels: Bliss, A Taste of Sin, Every Dark Desire, Hungry for It, Dangerous Pleasures, and Broken in Soft Places. She has also written three novellas: Pure Pleasure, Going Wild, and Sexual Attraction published in the collections Satisfy Me, Satisfy Me Again and Satisfy Me Tonight, respectively. Her first novel, Bliss, and the third, Every Dark Desire, were both finalists for the Lambda Literary Award. Her seventh novel, Desire at Dawn, was published in June 2014.

== Personal life ==
Zedde is a lesbian. She lives in Madrid, Spain.
