= Julie Anne Peters =

American writer (1952–2023)

- Born: January 16, 1952; Jamestown, New York, U.S.
- Died: March 21, 2023 (aged 71); Wheat Ridge, Colorado, U.S.
- Education: Colorado Women's College (BA); Metropolitan State University of Denver (BS); University of Colorado Denver (MBA)
- Occupation: Writer
- Spouse: Sheri Leggett (m. 2014)
- Writing career
- Genre: Young adult
- Notable works: Keeping You a Secret (2003); Luna (2004); By the Time You Read This, I'll Be Dead (2010)

Julie Anne Peters (January 16, 1952 – March 21, 2023) was an American author of young adult fiction. Peters published 20 works, mostly novels, geared toward children and adolescents, many of which feature LGBT characters. In addition to the United States, Peters's books have been published in numerous countries, including South Korea, China, Croatia, Germany, France, Italy, Indonesia, Turkey and Brazil. Her 2004 book Luna was the first young-adult novel with a transgender character to be released by a mainstream publisher.

== Early life and education ==
Julie Anne Peters was born in Jamestown, New York, on January 16, 1952, one of four siblings. When she was five, her family moved to the suburbs of Denver. Her parents divorced when she was in high school.

Peters received a BA in elementary education from Colorado Women's College in 1974, with a minor in French. She earned a BS in computer and management science from the Metropolitan State University of Denver in 1985. During the next ten years, Peters worked as a research analyst, computer programmer, and systems engineer. In 1989, Peters earned an MBA from the University of Colorado Denver with emphasis in information systems.

== Career ==
Peters first worked as a teacher, teaching fifth grade and working as a special needs education assistant in the Jefferson County School District in Lakewood, Colorado, in 1975. However, she was unsuccessful as an educator, and pursued a different career path. She subsequently worked as a secretary, research assistant, computer programmer and systems analyst for Tracom Corporation in Denver from 1975 until 1984. Following this, Peters was a computer systems engineer for Electronic Data Systems in Denver from 1985 until 1988.

Peters began her writing career with the publication of her first two books, The Stinky Sneakers Contest, illustrated by Cat Bowman Smith, in 1992, and Risky Friends in 1993.

== Personal life and death ==
Peters married her longtime partner, Sherri Leggett, in 2014. They lived in Wheat Ridge, Colorado.

Peters died at her home on March 21, 2023, at the age of 71.

== Published works ==
- The Stinky Sneakers Contest (1992) ISBN 0316702145, 978-0316702140
- Risky Friends (1993) ISBN 0874066468, 978-0874066463
- B.J.'s Billion Dollar Bet (1995) ISBN 0380724995, 978-0380724994
- How Do You Spell G-E-E-K? (1996) ISBN 0788729624, 978-0788729621
- Revenge of the Snob Squad (1998) ISBN 0316008125, 978-0316008129
- Romance of the Snob Squad (1999) ISBN 0316008133, 978-0316008136
- Love Me, Love My Broccoli (1999) ISBN 0380798999, 978-0380798995
- Define "Normal" (2000) ISBN 978-0316046404
- A Snitch in the Snob Squad (2001) ISBN 0316702870, 978-0316702874
- Keeping You a Secret (2003)
- Luna (2004)
- Far from Xanadu (2005) – later republished as Pretend You Love Me
- Between Mom and Jo (2006)
- grl2grl (2007)
- Rage: A Love Story (2009)
- By The Time You Read This I'll Be Dead (2010)
- She Loves You, She Loves You Not... (2011)
- grl2grl 2 (2012)
- It's Our Prom (So Deal With it) (2012)
- Lies My Girlfriend Told Me (2014)

== Awards ==
Peters has won numerous awards including:

- KC3 Reading Award, Greater Kansas City Association of School Librarians in 1995 for The Stinky Sneakers Contest
- Best Book in Language Arts: K-6 Novels, Society of School Librarians International in 1997 for How Do You Spell GEEK?
- Top Hand Award for Young-Adult Fiction, Colorado Authors' League in 1998 for Revenge of the Snob Squad
- Best Books for Young Adults selection, Popular Paperbacks for Young Adults selection and Quick Pick for Reluctant Young Adult Readers selection, all American Library Association (ALA) awards, in 2000 for Define "Normal"
- Best Books for Young Adults selection and Popular Paperbacks for Young Adults selection, ALA, Books for the Teen Age selection, New York Public Library and Lambda Literary Award finalist in 2003 for Keeping You a Secret
- Amelia Bloomer Project Recommended Feminist Books for Youth and Stonewall Honor Book, ALA, in 2004 for Keeping You a Secret
- Buxtehuder Bulle nomination, National Book Award in Young People's Literature finalist in 2004 for Luna
- Best Books for Young Adults selection, ALA, Books for the Teen Age selection, New York Public Library, Stonewall Honor Book and Lambda Literary Award finalist in 2005 for Luna
- Rainbow Reads selection, ALA, in 2005 for Far from Xanadu
- Best Books for Young Adults selection and Quick Pick for Reluctant Young-Adult Readers selection, ALA, and Books for the Teen Age selection, New York Public Library in 2006 for Far from Xanadu
- Lambda Literary Award, James Cook Teen Book Award, Ohio Library Council, Cybils Award finalist and Rainbow Reads selection in 2006 for Between Mom and Jo
- Golden Crown Literary Award finalist and Rainbow Reads selection in 2007 for grl2grl
- Books for the Teen Age selection, New York Public Library and Cooperative Children's Books Center Choice designation in 2008 for grl2grl
