= Eaton Hamilton =

Canadian writer

- Born: July 19, 1954 (age 72); Hamilton, ON
- Citizenship: Canadian
- Occupations: short story writer, poet, visual artist, and photographer
- Children: 2
- Writing career
- Notable awards: CBC Literary Awards/Canada Writes, 2003/2014, first place, fiction

Eaton Hamilton (born July 19, 1954) is a Canadian short story writer, novelist, essayist and poet, and uses they/their pronouns.

Hamilton has published the novel Weekend (Arsenal Pulp Press 2016), three books of poetry, Body Rain (1992) and Steam-Cleaning Love (1993), Love Will Burst into a Thousand Shapes (2014), a poetry chapbook (Going Santa Fe, winner of the League of Canadian Poets Poetry Chapbook prize), a prose chapbook (Would You Like A Little Gramma on That? 2020, first published at Joyland), and two volumes of short fiction July Nights and Other Stories, (Douglas and McIntyre, 1991) and Hunger, (Oberon, 2001). They are also the author, under the name of Ellen Prescott, of the memoir No More Hurt which was included on the Guardian's Best Book of the Year list and was a Sunday Times bestseller. Their books have been shortlisted for the Ethel Wilson Fiction Prize, the ReLit Award, the VanCity Award, the Pat Lowther Award, the Ferro-Grumley Award, and the MIND Book Prize.

Their short work has appeared in such publications as En Route, The Sun, The New York Times, Maclean's, Geist, LARB, Guernica, the Missouri Review, Gay Magazine, Salon, The Rumpus, The Globe and Mail and Seventeen. Their work has appeared in dozens of anthologies. They have won many awards for short work, including, twice, first prize in the CBC Literary Awards (2003/2014), 2015's Lit Pop Prize, judged by George Saunders, twice first prize in the Prism International Short Story Award, Canadian Poetry Chapbook of the Year from the League of Canadian Poets, twice the event Non-Fiction Award, and many others. Their stories and poems have been included in The Journey Prize and Best Canadian Poetry. They were shortlisted for the 2024 Commonweath Short Story Prize.

They were a litigant in the Canadian same-sex marriage case between 2000 and 2003. They spent several years as a professional art/family photographer and for years volunteered for the organization Now I Lay Me Down to Sleep, photographing deceased or dying infants and young children with their families. For the past 25 years, they have been drawing and painting.

They are also an activist/advocate in many fields: anti-violence against girls/women; 2LGBTAI+ rights; the environment/politics; disability rights (esp as concerns Canlit accessibility issues and covid misinformation) and a keen daily learner with a particular interest in animal communication and cross-species communication.

== Bibliography ==
- Would You Like a Little Gramma on Those, chapbook, above/ground press, 2020 ISBN 978-1-77460-127-3
- Weekend, novel, Arsenal Pulp Press, 2016 ISBN 1551526352
- Love Will Burst into a Thousand Shapes, poetry, Caitlin Press, 2014 ISBN 1927575575
- No More Hurt, cnf, ebury/Random UK, 2011 ISBN 0091943337
- Hunger, short fiction, Oberon Press 2002 ISBN 0-7780-1202-6 (hardcover) ISBN 0-7780-1203-4 (softcover)
- Going Santa Fe, poetry, League of Canadian Poets, 1997, ISBN 1-896216-06-4
- Steam-Cleaning Love, poetry, Brick Books, 1993, ISBN 0-919626-68-8
- July Nights, short fiction, Douglas and McIntyre, 1992 ISBN 1-55054-015-7
- Body Rain, poetry, Brick Books, 1991, ISBN 0-919626-50-5
- Jessica's Elevator, children's picture book, Press Porcépic, 1989, as J.A. Hamilton ISBN 0-88878-281-0

== Notable awards ==
- Splinter, Notable, Best American Essays, 2022
- Game Show, Best Canadian Poetry, 2020
- The Dead Green Man, Event, Notable, Best American Essays, 2021
- The Pleasure Scale, Gay Magazine, Notable, Best American Essays, 2021
- Battery, Best American Experimental Writing, 2020
- Splinter, second place, Malahat Review, cnf Contest, 2020
- The Dead Green Man, Event, winner, Non Fiction Contest, 2020
- The Nothing Between Your Legs, Notable, Best American Essays, 2019
- Skinning the Rabbit, Notable, Best American Essays, 2018
- Wish You Were Here Best Canadian Poetry, 2016
- Never Say I Didn't Bring You Flowers, Notable, Best American Essays, 2016
- Battery, Lit Pop fiction, 2015, winner (judge: George Saunders)
- Smiley, CBC Canada Writes, fiction, 2014
- The Lost Boy, CBC Literary Awards, first prize, fiction, 2003
- Territory Journey Prize anthology, 1999
- Goombay Smash Prism Int'l Short Fiction Prize, first, 1998, Best Canadian Stories, 1999
- Graduation Journey Prize anthology, 1998
- How to Have Heart Disease (Without Really Trying) notable, Best American Short Stories, 1997
- Death in One Another's Arms story, cited, Pushcart Prize, 1989

=== Notable awards, books ===
- Weekend was longlisted for the ReLit Award
- Going Santa Fe won the 1997 League of Canadian Poets Canadian Poetry Chapbook Award
- July Nights was short-listed for the VanCity Award and the Ethel Wilson Fiction Award in the BC Book Prizes
- Body Rain was short-listed for the Pat Lowther Award
- No More Hurt was shortlisted for the VanCity Award and the MIND book award
- Hunger, 2003 Publishing Triangle Awards, Ferro Grumley Prize, finalist, longlisted Lambda Literary Award, 2004

== See also ==
- Lesbian Poetry
