= Lee Lynch (author) =

American novelist

- Born: September 9, 1945 (age 80); New York City, U.S.
- Occupation: Author
- Notable awards: The Alice B Readers Award (2007); Jim Duggins Outstanding Mid-Career Novelists' Prize (2010)
- Spouse: Elaine Mulligan (m. 2010)

Website
- www.leelynchwriter.com

Lee Lynch (born September 9, 1945) is an American author writing primarily on lesbian themes, specifically noted for authentic characterizing of butch and femme characters in fiction. She is the recipient of a Golden Crown Literary Society Trail Blazer award for lifetime achievement, as well as being the namesake for the Golden Crown Literary Society's Lee Lynch Classics Award.

== Personal life ==
Lynch was born in Manhattan, New York on September 9, 1945. Throughout school, she was bullied for being different. She began to realize her lesbian sexuality around age 15. Lynch says that her protest against societal norms were individual acts, such as kissing her girlfriend in public, or dressing in men's clothing as much as possible. At the time, acts such as these meant she was basically considered a juvenile delinquent by New York law. In the 1960s, Lynch became aware of The Ladder, the first nationally distributed lesbian publication in the United States, and began contributing lesbian fiction and non-fiction to The Ladder.

In the 1980s, Lynch was in a relationship with another lesbian artist, Tee Corinne.

In 2009, Lynch moved from the Oregon Coast to Florida where she earned a living as a researcher. She has since retired and returned to Oregon in 2013, enabling her to work full-time on writing pursuits.

In 2010, she married Elaine Mulligan in Provincetown, Massachusetts. The couple lives in the Pacific Northwest.

== Career ==
Lynch published her first piece of writing in The Ladder in the late 1960s. From there, she became a frequent contributor, as it was the only lesbian publication at the time.

In 1983, Lynch published her first novel, Toothpick House, with Naiad Press. She went on to publish 10 more novels with Naiad, between the years 1984-1994. She has also published essays, and her stories have appeared in a number of anthologies. She has written reviews and feature articles for The Lambda Book Report and many other publications. Lynch's syndicated column, "The Amazon Trail", has been running in papers across the country since 1986.

Beginning in 2006, Lynch published 11 more lesbian novels with Bold Strokes Books, a New York queer publishing house.

Lynch cites Isabel Miller, Willa Cather, and Jane Rule as some of her writing inspirations.

Many younger lesbian writers such as Lori L. Lake, Karin Kallmaker, and Rachel Spangler have cited her influence, especially regarding the importance of authenticity in lesbian literature. Her adept way of characterizing butch and femme characters in her writing set the standard for many novelists writing since the 1970s.

Lynch has stated that her birth family has never read her work.

== Awards and honors ==
In 2006, Lynch was inducted into the Saints and Sinners Literary Festival's Hall of Fame in New Orleans.

Lynch's novel Sweet Creek was a finalist for a Golden Crown Literary Society Award and was named one of the top ten fiction books of the year by the Q Syndicate.

In 2009 Lynch was awarded the Golden Crown Literary Society Trail Blazer award for lifetime achievement, in recognition of the contributions she has made to the field of lesbian literature.

In addition, her novel Beggar of Love won the 2010 Ann Bannon Popular Choice Award. Amusingly enough, she also won the James Duggins Mid-Career Prize in 2010, after more than forty-five years of writing.

In 2012, the Golden Crown Literary Society issued a new award for classic, "timeless" fiction and named it The Lee Lynch Classics Award. The inaugural book awarded with the very first trophy was Lynch's 1985 tour de force, The Swashbuckler.

== Writing career ==
- Toothpick House Naiad edition (1983) - Irrepressible cab driver Annie Heaphy falls for a Yalie and brings the old and new gay cultures together.
- Old Dyke Tales (1984) - Short stories of lesbian love and life.
- The Swashbuckler (1985) - The famous novel about butch/femme relationships and authentic lesbian life in the 1960s and 70s.
- Home In Your Hands (1986) - Short stories about the women Lynch's readers have come to love.
- Dusty's Queen of Hearts Diner (1987) - Book 1 of the Morton River Valley Trilogy. Dusty and Elly's brainchild is the beating heart of Morton River Valley as well as the target of its bigotry.
- The Amazon Trail (1988) - Lynch's early self-syndicated columns from gay papers across the country.
- Sue Slate, Private Eye (1989) - An Alleycat detective and a feline torch singer are San Francisco top cats in this mystery spoof.
- That Old Studebaker (1991) - Andy Blaine's two great loves are Regina and the car. A story of love and loss on a cross country ride.
- Morton River Valley (1992) - Book 2 of the Morton River Valley Trilogy. Paris Collins turns heads and captures hearts as she gets involved with both an immigrant family and the descendant of an uppercrust family.
- Cactus Love (1994) - Short Stories with old and new heroines.
- Off the Rag (1996) - edited by Lee Lynch and Akia Woods - An anthology of personal writings by lesbians about menopause.
- Rafferty Street (1998) - Book 3 of the Morton River Valley Trilogy - Annie Heaphy of Toothpick House moves to the Valley seeking love and home.
- Sweet Creek (2006) - A story of love, community and the changing tides of time in a town where lesbians come in search of a paradise.
- The Butch Cook Book (2008) - edited by Lee Lynch, Sue Hardesty and Nel Ward.
- Beggar of Love (October 2009)- Never lacking a lover, Jefferson knows little of love; brought up on the right side of the tracks, she's drawn to the wild side. Every lesbian has known Jefferson — or is Jefferson.
- Toothpick House ebook edition (1983/2010) - Irrepressible cab driver Annie Heaphy falls for a Yalie and brings the old and new gay cultures together.
- The Raid (2012) - A story of lesbian love, life, history, and more.
- The Amazon Trail: A Quarter Century of Queer Life in the United States (2014)
- Rainbow Gap: Book 1 in the Rainbow Gap Lesbian Family Saga (2016)
- Our Happy Hours: LGBT Voices From the Gay Bars (2017)
- Accidental Desperados: Book 2 in the Rainbow Gap Lesbian Family Saga (2021)
- Defiant Hearts: The Classic Short Stories (2022)
- A Magnificent Disturbance: Book 3 in the Rainbow Gap Lesbian Family Saga (2025)

== Awards and recognition ==
- 2023 Defiant Hearts: The Classic Short Stories - Golden Crown Literary Society Award for Fiction Anthology/Collection
- 2018 Our Happy Hours: LGBT Voices From the Gay Bars - Golden Crown Literary Society Award with for Anthology/Collection (Creative Non-Fiction)
- 2017 Ann Bannon Popular Choice Award for Rainbow Gap - Golden Crown Literary Society
- 2015 An American Queer - Golden Crown Literary Society Award for Anthology/Collection (Creative Non-Fiction)
- 2013 The Raid - Golden Crown Literary Society Award for Dramatic General Fiction
- 2012 The Lee Lynch Classic Book Award - Golden Crown Literary Society for The Swashbuckler
- 2010 Jim Duggins Outstanding Mid-Career Novelists' Prize - Saints and Sinners Literary Festival
- 2010 Ann Bannon Popular Choice Award for Beggar of Love - Golden Crown Literary Society
- 2009 Beggar of Love - ForeWord Magazine Reviews - GLBT Book of the Year Bronze Prize
- 2009 Beggar of Love - Lesbian Fiction Reader's Choice Award for General Fiction
- 2009 Trailblazer Award - Golden Crown Literary Society
- 2007 Sweet Creek - Golden Crown Literary Society Award Finalist
- 2007 The Alice Medal for Lifetime Achievement The Alice B Readers Award
- 2006 Inducted into the Saints and Sinners Hall of Fame
- 1997 Off the Rag, Women Write About Menopause Lambda Literary Award Finalist with co-editor Akia Woods
- 1990 Sue Slate, Private Eye - Lambda Literary Award Finalist
