= Launch Point Press =

American publishing company

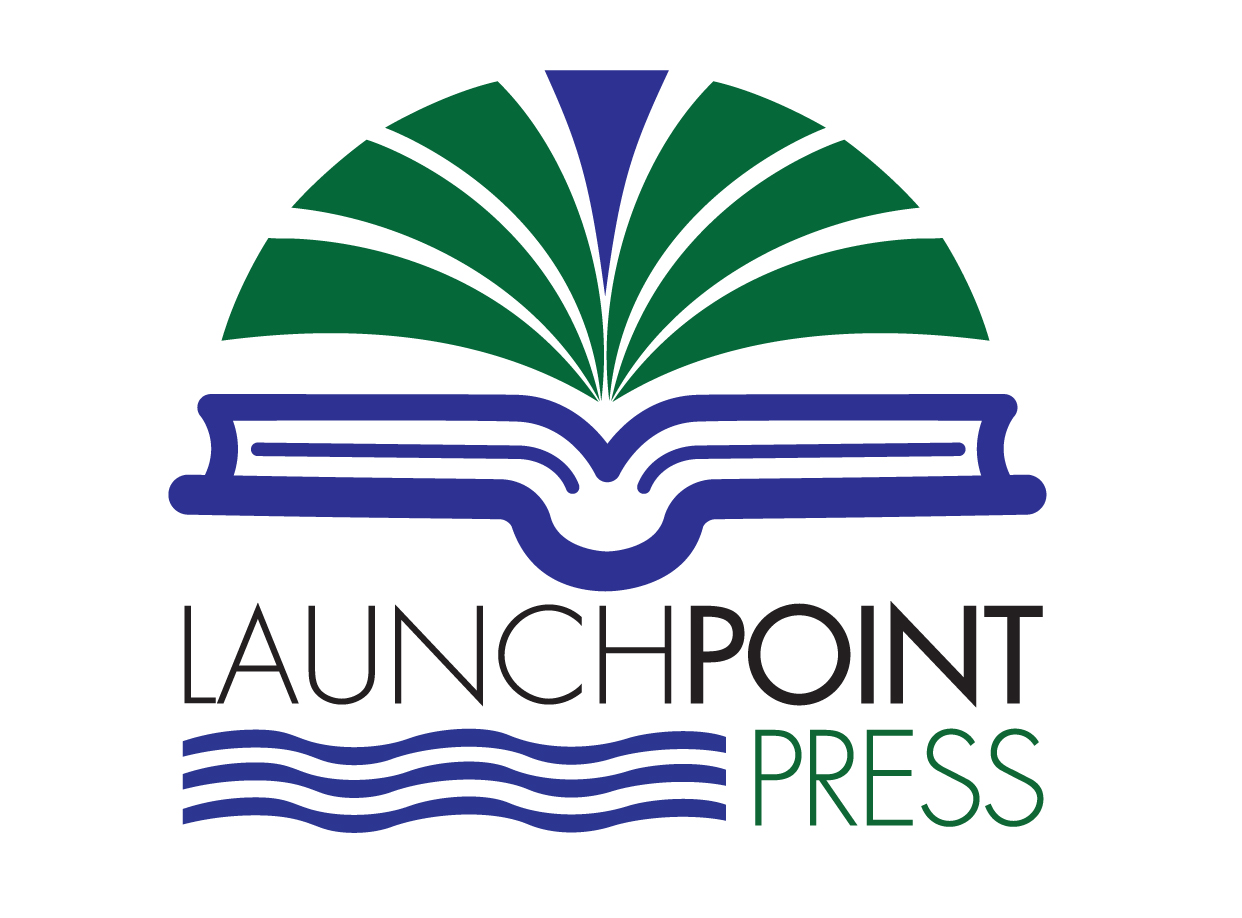
- Founded: 2014
- Founder: Lori L. Lake
- Successor: Jodi Zeramby & Peggy Zeramby
- Country of origin: United States
- Headquarters location: Portland, Oregon
- Publication types: novels, short story collections, anthologies, poetry
- Nonfiction topics: lesbian crime fiction, romance, speculative/sci-fi/fantasy fiction
- Fiction genres: Lesbian fiction
- Official website: www.launchpointpress.com

Launch Point Press is a small press publisher of lesbian literature based in Portland, Oregon.

== History ==
Launch Point Press (LPP) is a lesbian-oriented press with the goal of publishing quality works by newer authors just “launching” their careers or by experienced authors “re-launching” their work. LPP is on the list of women's presses "dedicated either wholly or to a significant degree to publishing material written for, by, or about women. Many of them started during the 'second wave' of feminism."

The primary focus of LPP is lesbian fiction: lesbian romance, lesbian crime fiction, and lesbian speculative fiction/sci-fi/fantasy novels. A typical production year includes 8 - 10 trade paperback releases.

Effective January 1, 2023, the founder of the press, Lori L. Lake, sold it to new owners Jodi Zeramby and Peggy Zeramby. On January 1, 2025, Jodi Zeramby and Peggy Zeramby welcomed, as a sister press, Desert Palm Press, another lesbian-oriented and established small press, established by Lee Fitzsimmons.

== Authors ==
- Edith Zeitlberger
- EJ Kindred
- Heather Werner
- Jane Cuthbertson
- Jazzy Mitchell
- Judy M. Kerr
- Lee Sato
- Linda Vogt
- Michele L. Coffman
- Rashah Solun
- Reba Birmingham
- Sandra de Helen
- Sandra Leigh Gable

== Awards ==
LPP authors have won Golden Crown Literary Society “Goldie” Awards, Lesfic Bard Awards, and have been finalists for many honors including the Rainbow Awards, and local honors in their individual states and communities.

== Recommended Online Reading ==
- The Lesbian Pulp Fiction That Saved Lives: How potboilers and pin-ups showed gay and bisexual women they were not alone by Natasha Frost (2020)
- The 100 Best Lesbian Fiction & Memoir Books Of All Time by The Team at Autostraddle (2012)
- Lesbian Pulp Novels Made Me Feel Normal by Jessica Xing (2020)
