= Feminist credit unions =

Credit unions founded by feminists to address discriminatory practices in lending

Feminist federal credit unions (FFCUs) are credit unions founded by feminists to address discriminatory practices in banking and loaning. In the United States, feminist credit unions rose to prominence during the 1970s. The first feminist credit union, which is also the oldest women's financial organization, was founded in Detroit, Michigan on August 26, 1973, which is the anniversary of Women's Suffrage. The Detroit FFCU was co-founded by Valerie Angers and Joanna Parrent, who were feminists that sought to create a service for women and controlled by women. The main goal of the FFCU was to offer freedom in banking and loan institutions from discrimination based on sex, marital status, or credit rating of the women's husband or father. Only women reviewed a woman's loan application, and these loans were used for a variety of things such as cars, homes, divorces, abortions, and funding for movements towards self-fulfillment. Women also used their loans to help with other feminist movements. For example, In 1976, Carol Seajay and Paula Wallace received a loan from the San Francisco Feminist Federal Credit Union to start a feminist bookstore called Old Wives Tales. The FFCUs also focused on teaching financial literacy to women who never were allowed to manage money before.

Women, for decades, faced discriminatory practices in the loan and credit industry. FFCUs rose due to a shift in conceptions of women's rights. In 1974, Congress passed the Equal Credit Opportunity Act (ECOA), which made it illegal to for banks and lenders to discriminate based on sex or marital status. Despite this, women were still considered to be second-class financial citizens, and combated their economic standing by turning to women-only or women-centered financial institutions. Prior to 1848, married women were not allowed to own any real estate; the women's husband owned any property that was hers. In addition to this, women who were married could also not acquire new property. It was during the 1960s when women were first allowed to open their own bank accounts. However, it was not until 1974 that it became illegal to require women to take out loans with a male co-signer, and women often found themselves with larger interest rates and higher required down payments prior to this.

The Feminist Economic Network was founded in 1975 as an alliance of several feminist credit unions in the United States. The purpose of its formation was to enhance the inner-leading capacities of the FFCUs and to encourage new credit unions to form.

== How Feminist Federal Credit Unions Worked ==
To become a member of a FFCU, the only requirements were to sign a membership application, pay the $2 membership fee, and to open a shares account with a minimum of $5. All members of the National Organization of Women (NOW) and the Women's Liberation Coalition of Michigan were eligible to join the first FFCU in Detroit. All of the savings at the Federal Feminist were insured to $40,000 by the National Credit Union Administration, with dividend rates being up to a maximum 7 percent with no minimum balance or time requirements. In addition to this, the FFCUs paid for Share Life Insurance in the case of death, where the member's beneficiary would receive an amount equal to the member's share account. The maximum amount of insurable shares was $2,000. There was a Loan Protection Insurance, which ensured that the loan would be covered by the FFCU in case of the member's death, and there was also an optional Disability Insurance.

All of the FFCUs members, and only their members, were eligible for loans. One of the main criteria that was taken into account before issuing a loan was character and ability to repay the loan. The annual loan interest rate, specifically at the Detroit FFCU, was 12 percent, or 1 percent per month on the unpaid balance. Money orders were available to members at 25 cents each in amounts up to $250. The FFCUs also had "share drafts", which served the purpose of personal checks. FFCUs operated similar to full-service institutions due to all of these services they provided to its members.

== Disbandment ==
By the early 1980s, majority of the FFCUs began to disband and some of the FFCUs underwent involuntary liquidation. The National Credit Union Administration (NCUA) was appointed to liquidate the feminist credit unions and was responsible for paying off all shares and debts, and they arranged to collect any loans that were owed to the FFCU. There were three main reasons as to why many of the FFCUs closed: large debts, slow growth, and office management issues. The issue of office management was selective to certain FFCUs, for example the First Pennsylvania Feminist Credit Union, and it was a temporary problem. FFCUs prioritized trusting women rather than assessing if they were credit risks, which led to many of the loans taken out not being paid back and resulted in the credit unions having difficulty paying back their loans. Many of the FFCUs had racked up delinquent loans, but despite this, many of the members of the FFCUs did not consider the disbandments to be a failure.

Women of the FFCUs considered these credit unions to still be a success as the purpose of them was to catalyze the movement for equal credit. Co-founder of the Connecticut Feminist Federal Credit Union, Susan Osborne, stated that many of the immediate issues the FFCUs sought to solve were fixed because of how effective the FFCUs were, so they had gone on to work on other problems. She, and many other owners of the FFCUs, thought that closing down the credit unions was justified as the immediate problems were resolved, and that the FFCUs were effective and performed successfully for their main purpose. These women believed that through the FFCUs, that they had changed culture, created more feminist books, had more female voices in publishing, and that there was an increase in the diversity of ideas. So, although there were financial reasons for the FFCUs closing, many of the women who were part of the feminist credit unions believed they were also closing due to their success, and how they were not necessarily needed anymore as they solved many of the immediate issues they were looking to resolve.

== Feminist Credit Unions ==
Between 1973 and 1980, there were about 26 feminist credit unions across the United States and two in Canada that opened.

Feminist Federal Credit Unions
| Name | Location(s) | Member Organizations | Year Founded | Year closed |
|---|---|---|---|---|
| Feminist FFCU | Detroit (Later Ann Arbor and Lansing), MI | 7 | 1973 | 1982 |
| Connecticut FFCU | Hartford and New Haven, CT | 4 | 1974, 1975 | 1977 |
| First Pennsylvania FFCU | Harrisburg, PA | 3 | 1974 | unknown |
| Freedom FFCU | Pittsburgh, PA | 1 | 1974 | 1978 |
| Washington FFCU | Washington, DC | 3 | 1974 | 1977 |
| Dallas FFCU (Women's Southwest Federal Credit Union) | Dallas, TX | unknown | 1974 | 2012 |
| Massachusetts FFCU | Cambridge, MA | 5 | 1974 | unknown |
| California FFCU | San Diego, CA | 3 | 1975 | 2009 |
| Greater New York FFCU | New York City, NY | 11 | 1975 | 1981 |
| Houston Area FFCU | Houston, TX | 14 | 1975 | unknown |
| Tallahassee FCU | Tallahassee, FL | 2 | 1975 | unknown |
| Feminist Credit Union of South Miami | Miami, FL | 6 | 1975 | unknown |
| Southwest Pennsylvania N.O.W. FFCU | Pittsburgh, PA | 1 | 1975 | unknown |
| Bay Area FFCU | San Francisco, CA | 4 | 1976 | 1979 |
| Washington State FFCU | Seattle, WA | 2 | 1976 | unknown |
| Denver FFCU | Denver, CO | 5 | 1976 | 1979 |
| Westchester Women's Credit Union | Westchester, NY | 5 | 1976 | unknown |
| Charleston FFCU | Charleston, SC | 1 | 1976 | unknown |
| Los Angeles FFCU | Los Angeles, CA | unknown | 1976 | unknown |
| Metropolitan Toronto Women's Credit Union | Toronto, Ontario | 1 | 1976 | unknown |
| Columbia FFCU | Columbia, MO | 5 | 1976 | unknown |
| Wisconsin Women's Credit Union | Marshfield, WI | 5 | 1976 | unknown |
| San Antonio Women's Credit Union | San Antonio, TX | unknown | by 1976 | unknown |
| Austin Area Women's Credit Union | Austin, TX | unknown | by 1977 | unknown |
| Bluegrass Federal Feminist Credit Union | Louisville, KY | 1 | 1977 | unknown |
| Alaska FCU | Anchorage, AK | 12 | 1977 | 1985 |
| Oregon FFCU | Portland, OR | 4 | 1978 | unknown |
| Ottawa Women's Credit Union | Ottawa, Ontario | 1 | 1980 | unknown |
