= Women in print movement =

Movement in second-wave feminism

The women in print movement (WIP) was an international effort by second-wave feminists to establish autonomous communications networks created by and for women. The movement encouraged women to write and publish their works in feminist periodicals which were edited by women, printed by feminist presses, and distributed by informal networks and feminist bookstores. WIP emerged in the 1960s out of the women's liberation movement, a branch of radical feminism that viewed patriarchy as a hierarchical, systemic issue that could not be reformed. Many radical feminists were also feminist separatists and lesbian feminists who used the WIP movement to create women-centered economies and cultures.

The movement was decentralized and diverse, with hundreds of feminist periodicals and presses operating at the local and regional levels. Between 1968 and 1973, 560 feminist periodicals were established. Although most English language scholarship focuses on WIP in the United States and United Kingdom, there were also feminist publications and women's presses in Australia, France, Canada, South Africa, Germany, the Netherlands, Ireland, New Zealand, and India.

Women in the WIP movement used their publications for consciousness raising, reclaiming and reprinting earlier women's writings, self-expression, education, and movement coordination. Feminist presses provided an outlet for women's writings without the censorship and gatekeeping of traditional publishers. WIP presses and printers also gave women practical and professional skills in writing, editing, typesetting, and binding. Feminist bookstores were spaces where feminists could meet, host events, and find publications that were difficult or impossible to find in mainstream bookstores. Many WIP periodicals, presses, and bookstores operated as non-hierarchical collectives that relied on amateur and volunteer labor.

Most WIP presses and periodicals were short-lived due to many factors, notably the challenges of sustaining anti-capitalist enterprises that required significant resources such as equipment, supplies, and labor. However, WIP proved influential in the women's liberation movement and popular understandings of women, patriarchy, and feminism. Literary and communications scholar Simone Murray has called the mainstream success of feminist publishing enterprises the "most significant development in late twentieth-century book publishing." Publishers that survived into the 21st century include Feminist Press, Virago Press, and Naiad Press. Extant WIP periodicals include Sinister Wisdom and 13th Moon.

== Predecessors ==
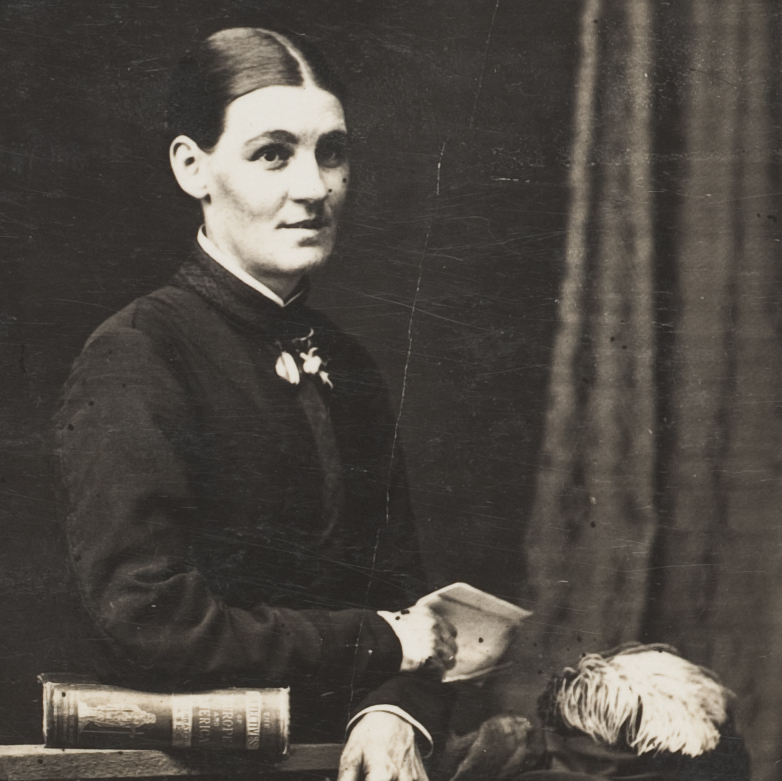
Louisa Lawson founded The Dawn, a feminist journal with all female editors and printers, in 1888.

First-wave feminists used the written word to organize suffragist activities and influence public opinion about women's rights in the 19th and 20th centuries. In 1888, Australian feminist Louisa Lawson founded The Dawn, a journal with all female editors and printers.

Another predecessor of WIP was Vice Versa, a lesbian magazine founded by Lisa Ben in 1947. At the time, obscenity laws forbade gay and lesbian content from being published and circulated, so Ben used her office typewriter at RKO Studios to compose, edit, and print Vice Versa. She typically made ten copies of each issue, gave them to friends, and asked them to pass the magazine along to other lesbians in their circles. Ben anticipated the later WIP movement's focus on volunteer labor, pilfered office supplies, and informal circulation networks.

The Ladder was a lesbian magazine published by the Daughters of Bilitis from 1956 to 1972 and a precursor to the WIP movement. It was assimilationist rather than separatist, but Barbara Grier's lesbian book reviews in The Ladder created an outlet for discussing and sharing lesbian literature, including pulp fiction which was widely denigrated as "trash." Grier later became editor of The Ladder under contentious circumstances, separated it from the Daughters of Bilitis, and founded Naiad Press.

== Causes ==
Feminists were critical of the mainstream press and alternative New Left media, which rarely printed women's writings, relegated female staff to typist roles, and published sexist stories which were dismissive of the emerging women's liberation movement. In the early 1970s, women staged takeovers of several publications, including the Los Angeles Free Press, Great Speckled Bird, and Rat. The increasing corporatization and monopolization of the mainstream press also concerned women's liberationists who wanted their writings to circulate in free and independent outlets. Second-wave feminists believed that publishing was an inherently political act and that women had to take publishing into their own hands to ensure their voices were heard.

Women encountered censorship when attempting to have their writings published or printed privately. The Ain't I a Woman? feminist collective founded Iowa City Women's Press in 1972 after commercial printers refused to print informational material about women's health and cervical self-examinations. There was increasing demand for accessible resources about women's health, particularly after the introduction of the birth control pill in the United States in 1960. Information about the pill was limited and could be withheld from single women, because Griswold v. Connecticut only established the right to use contraceptives without government interference for married couples. The rights of unmarried people to possess contraceptives were only established in 1972 with Eisenstadt v. Baird.

Many traditional publishers and commercial printers also refused to print lesbian material. After June Arnold could not find a publisher for her novel The Cook and the Carpenter, she founded Daughters, Inc. and published it herself. Ideological tensions due to the gay/straight split within feminism also influenced the creation of many lesbian publications. Marilyn Webb, who was a lesbian, founded Off Our Backs in 1969 after she was "purged" from D.C. Women's Liberation. The Furies Collective and its newspaper were also founded by lesbian separatists who had unsuccessfully attempted to form coalitions with straight feminists.

The growing popularity of offset printing and affordability of mimeograph machines were also major factors in the growth and spread of WIP. Mimeograph machines allowed women to self-publish large quantities of materials without much time, labor, or technical expertise. Dale Spender, Australian feminist and founder of Pandora Press, believed that women were only allowed greater influence in publishing beginning in the 1970s because this coincided with the rise of computer technology. According to Spender, "the feminization of print culture further devalued the medium in the eyes of the technological and financial elite, thus allowing more female control over the written word."

== Origins ==
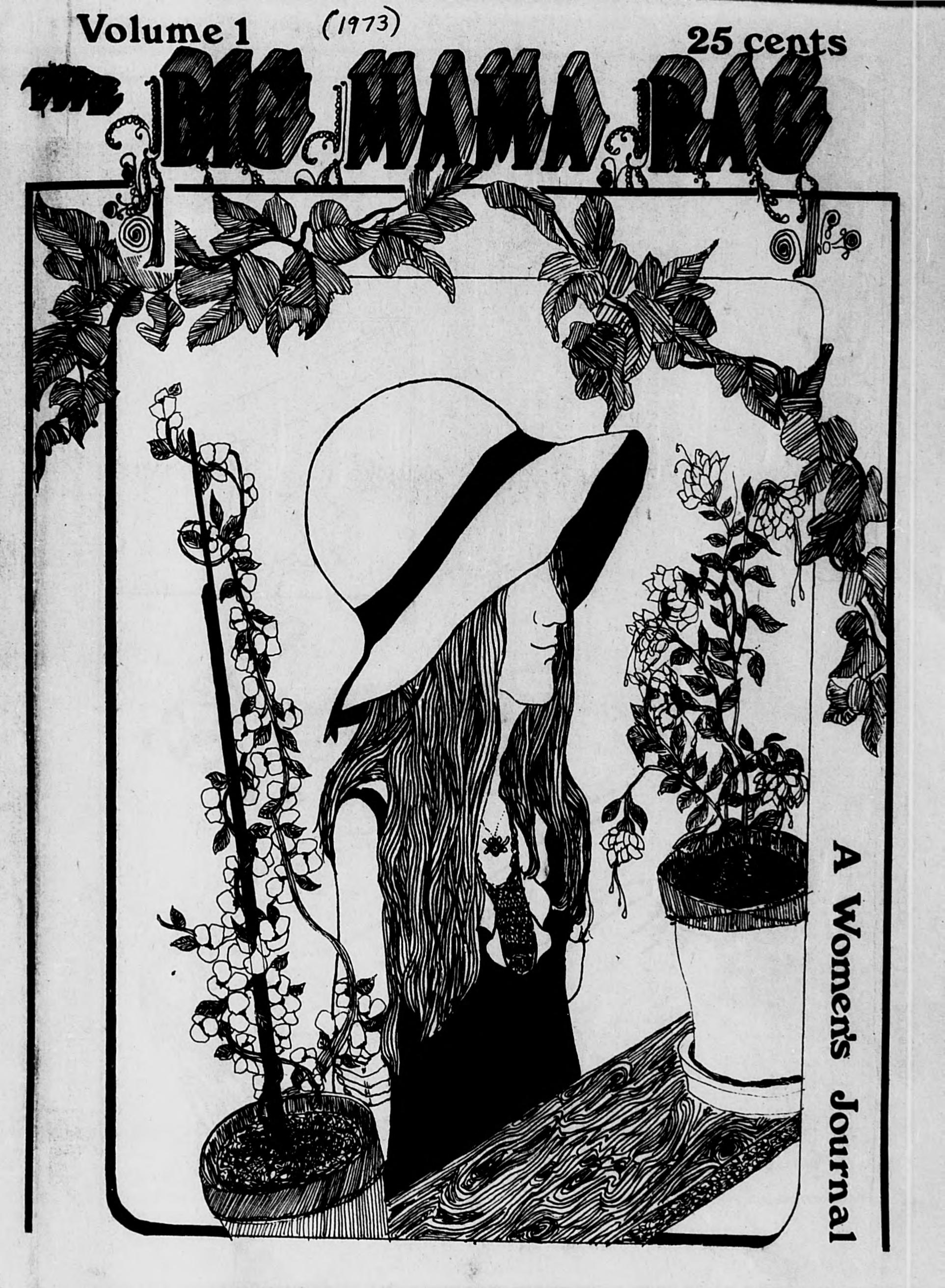
First issue of Big Mama Rag, 1973

Kathryn Thoms Flannery has named 1968 as the milestone year for identifiably separate feminist publications. WIP periodicals founded in 1968 included Lilith, No More Fun and Games, Voice of the Women's Liberation Movement, and Notes from the First Year.

WIP contributors were influenced by contemporary social and countercultural movements, including the civil rights movement, the New Left, and radical democracy organizations such as Students for a Democratic Society and the Student Nonviolent Coordinating Committee. WIP's emphasis on DIY aesthetics and collectivism also had roots in anarchist thought.

A key event in the movement was the first Women in Print Conference, which took place in Omaha, Nebraska in August 1976. 132 female editors, printers, publishers, and booksellers attended, representing 80 collectives and organizations. The conference was organized by June Arnold of Daughters, Inc., Coletta Reid of Diana Press, and Charlotte Bunch of Quest: A Feminist Quarterly. Reid and Bunch were former members of the Furies Collective. The conference was separatist from the outset, with attendance limited to WIP organizations which did not have men working in any part of their operations, though an exception was made for "Third World women working with men on Third World projects."

After the conference, Carol Seajay founded Feminist Bookstores Newsletter (FBN), which changed its name to Feminist Bookstore News in 1984. Seajay edited, printed, and distributed FBN as a one-woman operation until 2000. FBN had a comparatively large international circulation and became the definitive trade publication for feminist publishers and booksellers. Women in the movement used FBN to solicit submissions for their periodicals, share news, publicize new publications, and ask for advice about the book trade.

Women involved with WIP also networked and shared resources at events such as the International Feminist Bookfair and OutWrite conferences, which were held semi-regularly in the 1980s and 1990s.

== Aims and methods ==
The movement adopted the slogan "freedom of the press belongs to those who own the press," which was adapted from an A. J. Liebling quote. WIP's primary goal was to build an autonomous feminist publishing network where women's writings were published, printed, and circulated by women and woman-centered groups. Women in WIP accomplished this by establishing periodicals, publishing houses, print shops, and bookstores. Many women in the movement believed that feminist print enterprises should shun male collaborators, traditional presses, and mainstream publishing norms and marketing strategies. Several different strands of thought contributed to widespread feminist suspicion of the corporate and commercial press. However, there were disagreements about how strictly to interpret these separatist principles. Some WIP groups worked with men, non-feminist organizations, and mainstream publishers for pragmatic or ideological reasons.

WIP encouraged women to become involved in publishing networks, especially if they had little experience with writing, editing, or journalism. As a result, many feminist periodicals had an unrefined quality, often printed on cheap paper, stapled by hand, and featuring handwritten text and illustrations. Typographical errors, unusual layouts, and formatting inconsistencies were common. However, these amateurish features were often attractive to novice writers and editors who were encouraged to see a wide array of texts being printed and taken seriously in the WIP community. Some publications deliberately cultivated a DIY, lowbrow aesthetic in direct opposition to the male press. Other groups aimed for a professional tone, but discussions about how to improve the quality of the writing and consistency of the formatting led to debates about gatekeeping, racism, classism, and elitism.

Many WIP publications and presses operated as collectives run with volunteer and amateur labor. Some, such as the Women's Press, deprioritized staff wages when balancing their budgets. Workers were often paid subsistence wages well below minimum wage or required to contribute unpaid shifts on a regular schedule. This led to some collectives being dominated by white, middle-class women who could afford to work for free or very little pay. Criticism of racism and classism within the movement led to the creation of Kitchen Table: Women of Color Press in the United States and The Women's Press in the United Kingdom, which focused on women of color, working class women, and Third World women.

Poetry became especially important to the WIP and women's liberation movements, partially because it was cheap to print and viewed as an accessible and democratic medium. Poets such as Audre Lorde, Adrienne Rich, Pat Parker, Minnie Bruce Pratt, Rita Mae Brown, Dorothy Allison, and Judy Grahn published their poetry in WIP periodicals and presses.

Another popular WIP strategy was republishing forgotten and out of print books by women writers, which they viewed as reclaiming the works of their feminist predecessors. Women whose works were republished in this way include Agnes Smedley, Djuna Barnes, Sylvia Beach, Radclyffe Hall, Natalie Clifford Barney, Gertrude Stein, Alice B. Toklas, Colette, Kerryn Higgs, and Diane Bell. These editions often sold well and kept publishers like Virago Press financially afloat. WIP reprints also influenced the literary canon by drawing renewed attention to women's writings.

== Feminist periodicals ==
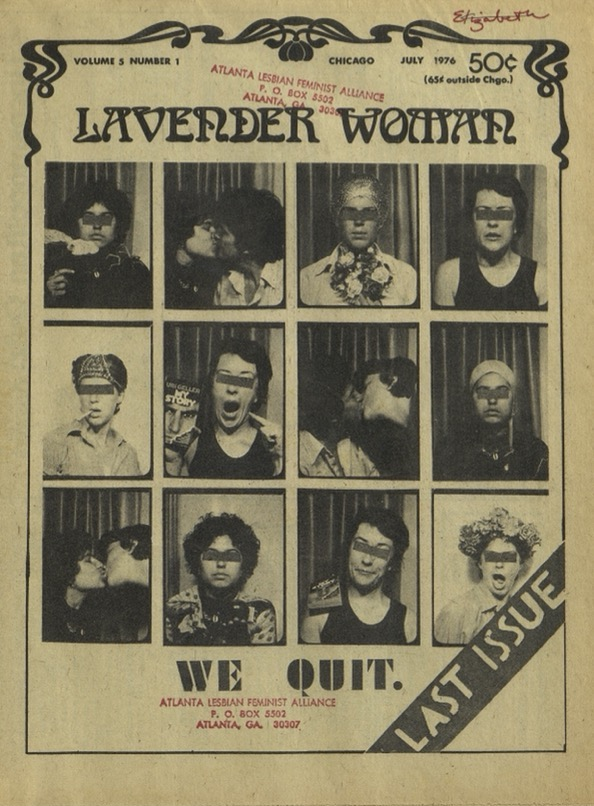
Lavender Woman volume 5, issue 1, 1976

WIP publications included zines, journals, magazines, newspapers, and newsletters. They featured a wide variety of content, including personal essays, poetry, fiction, calendars, letters, catalogs of other feminist publications, and informational materials about women's health, car repair, and self-publishing. Many periodicals had open submission policies, such as Female Liberation in Minneapolis, which promised to "print anything submitted by any woman." Others were more insular; Ain't I a Woman? was effectively a consciousness raising group newsletter written by a closed collective of feminists in Iowa City.

Other WIP publications in the United States included It Ain't Me, Babe, Big Mama Rag, Off Our Backs, Feminist Bookstore News, Amazon Quarterly, Sinister Wisdom, Lavender Woman, Feminary, and Distaff. Periodicals in the United Kingdom included Spare Rib, the socialist magazine Womens Voice [sic], and Shrew, a magazine produced by a rotating group of feminist collectives between 1969 and 1974. Australian publications included Shrew (not to be confused with the British magazine of the same name), MeJane, Mabel, and Melbourne Women's Liberation Newsletter.

== Feminist presses ==
For women in WIP, there were several benefits to feminist presses, notably lack of censorship and greater control over the publication and reprinting of their writings. Feminist presses were more willing to publish experimental and modernist literature that other publishers rejected. Some WIP publishers also pioneered alternative contracts and compensation models for their staff and authors. Persephone Press's contract for This Bridge Called My Back offered double the conventional royalty rates, a promise to spend half of the marketing budget on advertising to women of color, and the guarantee that Persephone would not sell the mass market rights to non-feminist publishers. Jennifer Gilley has called this contract "a model of feminist philosophy." An informal addendum to the contract promised to pay contributors an additional fee for every 10,000 copies sold, which was unprecedented in conventional publishing. This payment structure later proved financially burdensome for Persephone and Kitchen Table: Women of Color Press, which published the second edition of This Bridge Called My Back after Persephone folded in 1983.

Presses and print shops also provided occupational skills for women. Partially due to the movement's roots in the New Left, WIP collectives often provided practical, hands-on training for women and rotated jobs to ensure equity and skill development. Skilled trades like printing usually paid more than pink collar work. Many feminist presses operated as collectives with non-hierarchical structures and shared decision making, such as the Women's Press Collective in Oakland, California and Sara Press in the Netherlands. These tended to be smaller operations with modest budgets and sporadic publications compared to presses like Virago, which operated more like conventional publishers.

A matter of persistent debate within WIP was how and to what extent feminist presses should engage with traditional publishers. Some in the women's liberation movement worried that their cause would be tainted by commercial interests or that conventional publishers would force authors to deradicalize the contents of their works. When McGraw Hill published June Arnold's novel Applesauce in 1966, the press censored the original text by removing the words "cunt" and "fuck." Arnold was highly critical of the "finishing press", so called because she believed mainstream corporate publishers wanted to "finish" the women's movement by refusing to take feminist writings seriously. In a 1977 feature for The New York Times, Arnold and her collaborators at Daughters, Inc. debated whether they should sell the reprint rights for Rubyfruit Jungle by Rita Mae Brown to a mainstream publisher. Arnold's statement that "women can afford to say no" to lucrative offers from the male-dominated publishing industry was criticized by working class feminists and writers who wanted their works to receive broader exposure. Brown herself was in favor of selling the reprint rights due to the financial stability it would provide her. After Daughters eventually sold the rights to Bantam Books for $250,000, Arnold and Daughters were widely criticized for "selling out" in feminist circles.

Kitchen Table: Women of Color Press and Virago were two publishers that positioned themselves as analogues to conventional presses, with robust marketing and audiences beyond feminists and lesbians. The founder of Kitchen Table, Barbara Smith, said "unlike some alternative presses, we have never viewed smallness or lack of sales as a sign of either artistic success or political correctness." Some feminists allied themselves with non-feminist publishers and organizations in order to gain access to much-needed resources and support. Carol Seajay of Feminist Bookstore News worked in coalition with non-feminist independent presses and the American Booksellers Association to protest mass retailers and publishing conglomerates. Historian Trysh Travis has suggested that the WIP movement was partially absorbed into broader anti-corporate and anti-capitalist activism in the book trade.

Other feminist presses included Atalanta (the Netherlands), Éditions des Femmes (France), Everywoman Press (Australia), Frauenoffensive Verlag (Germany), Kali for Women (India), Labrys (Australia), Sara (the Netherlands), Spinifex Press (Australia), Sybylla Cooperative (Australia), and The Woman's Press (UK).

== Feminist bookstores and distributors ==
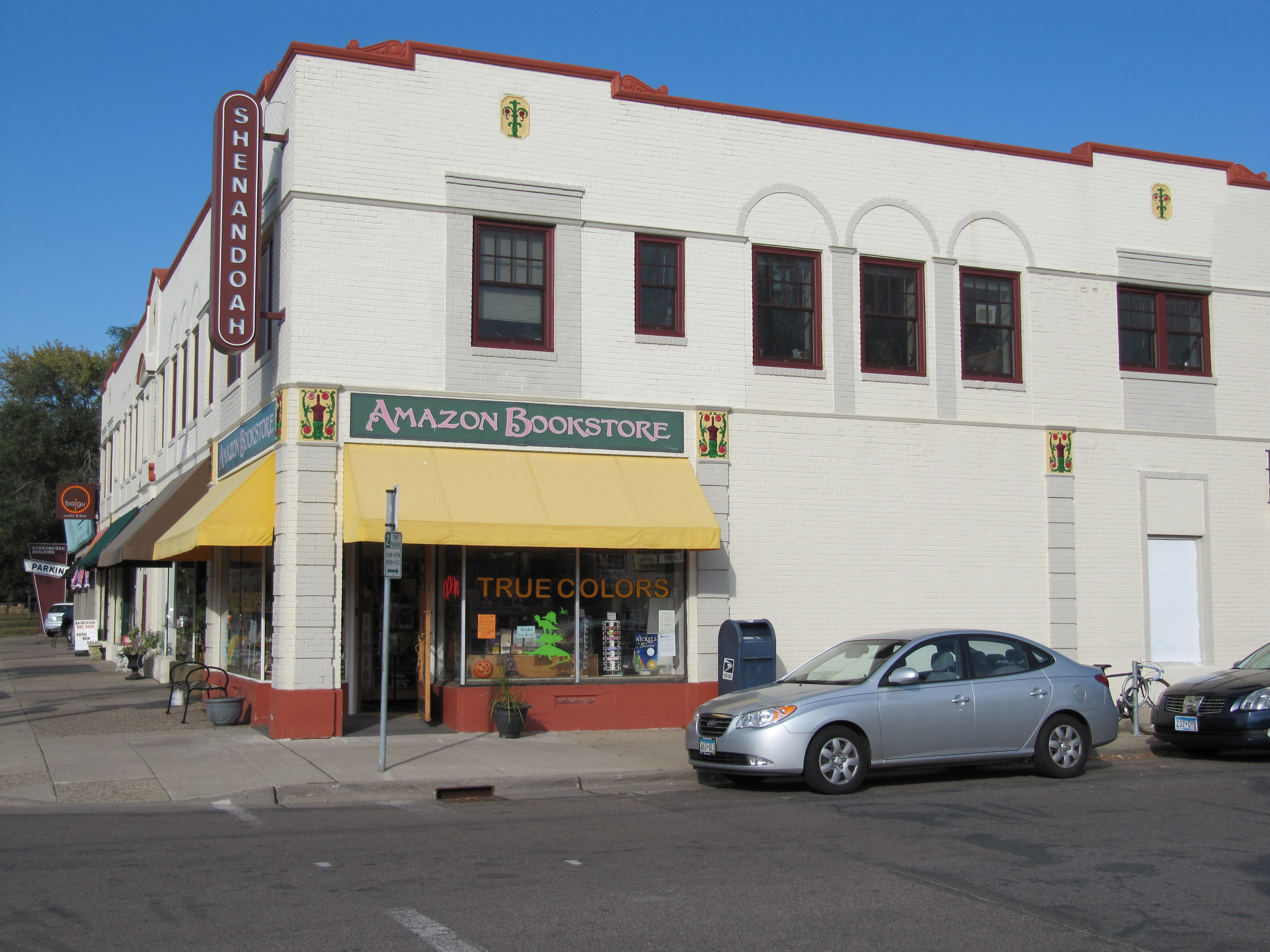
Amazon Bookstore Cooperative in Minneapolis

Due to its decentralized nature and the high number of small publications with limited circulation, WIP relied heavily on informal distribution networks. Women mailed each other books, traveled across the country carrying cartons of periodicals, and used the pages of publications like Feminist Bookstore News to coordinate swaps and trades.

Women involved with the movement founded feminist bookstores such as New Words Bookstore in Cambridge, Massachusetts, Old Wives Tales in San Francisco (founded by Carol Seajay of Feminist Bookstore News), Silver Moon Bookshop in London, Amazon Bookstore Cooperative in Minneapolis, and A Woman's Place in Oakland, California. Some, like A Woman's Place, operated as collectives. Others became nonprofits in order to survive after the rise of chain bookstores and e-commerce. Feminist bookstores provided community spaces where women could meet, find feminist publications and educational resources, share their books and writings, and host events.

Early feminist presses had to publish and distribute their own products. This was a labor-intensive process that involved creating catalogs, corresponding with customers and bookstores, and packing and shipping books. Women in Distribution (WinD) was a woman-owned and operated book distribution company founded by Helaine Harris and Cynthia Gair in 1973. WinD specialized in lesbian and feminist publications and supplied feminist bookstores with works from dozens of feminist presses and journals. Harris and Gair attended the 1976 WIP conference in Omaha and encouraged feminist presses to sign exclusive distribution contracts with WinD, another experiment in separatist feminist business practices. Like Feminist Bookstore News, WinD played a prominent role in establishing WIP cultural and economic networks. WinD closed in 1979, largely because book distribution requires quick, high volume sales to be profitable.

== Challenges and decline ==
WIP's primary challenges were economic and material. In addition to ideological debates about the ethics of pursuing capitalist goals such as profitability and contributing to non-feminist economies, WIP publications and presses often struggled to afford equipment and supplies. Groups who operated as collectives were sometimes hamstrung by what Jo Freeman called "the tyranny of structurelessness" and a tendency to prioritize intellectual discussion over concrete action. Publications that relied on volunteer labor were also prone to staffing and production issues. Some organizers burnt out, took long hiatuses, or moved on to other projects. In the early days of the women's liberation movement, many feminists believed that a global gender revolution was imminent. As the 1970s wore on, it became clear that the revolution would not be as immediate or radical as they imagined. Feminists were forced to reckon with the long-term need to financially support themselves while reconfiguring the level of support they could provide to feminist causes.

The success of some women's presses, such as Virago's modern classics series, may have contributed to the decline in independent feminist publishing. High sales figures convinced mainstream publishers that there was demand for new and formerly out of print women's writings, leading to competition and bidding wars. Smaller feminist presses struggled to compete with corporate publishers, especially during a period of industry instability in the 1980s and 1990s.

The recessions of the 1980s caused further financial difficulties for WIP groups and feminist businesses more broadly. Some feminist presses and bookstores survived by becoming nonprofits, which allowed them to accept grant funds. Others, such as Women in Distribution, preferred to operate as a business and chose to close instead of pursuing nonprofit status. Charlotte Bunch's views changed during this turbulent period, and she came to "favor compromise in the interests of survival."

Some scholars have posited that WIP efforts declined due to the mainstreaming of feminism and the establishment of academic departments for women's studies. Jaime Harker suggests that this mainstreaming was demonstrated by broader critical praise for Minnie Bruce Pratt, who won the Lamont Poetry Prize in 1989, and Dorothy Allison, whose 1992 novel Bastard Out of Carolina was a crossover success.

Although WIP contributed significantly to the development of the women's studies field, academics sought to establish scholarly journals in order to legitimize the new discipline. Academic journals were expected to conform to conventional publishing standards, which discouraged the styles and methods used by ephemeral and informal publications. Agatha Beins states that these new journals "signal the ways in which feminism became more intertwined with and welcome in political and intellectual sites of power." Feminist writings that might otherwise have been published in independent feminist outlets were therefore absorbed by traditional and academic publishers.

Agatha Beins and Julie R. Enszer have theorized that the closure of many feminist periodicals and presses in the 1980s and 1990s was not inherently negative and did not represent a failure of the causes of women's liberation and WIP. They describe the dissolution of the Iowa City Women's Press as a natural result of the lifecycle of consciousness raising groups, which often went into dormant periods. In her study of Lavender Woman, Michal Brody identified a lifecycle of inspiration, activity, conflict, exhaustion, and dispersion. Many WIP presses and publications followed this arc.

Simone Murray has suggested that the mainstreaming of feminist writings can be interpreted as a sign of the movement's success. Some presses' partnerships with traditional publishers were widely influential, such as The Feminist Press's licensing agreement with McGraw-Hill, which incorporated the Women's Lives, Women's Work series into many secondary schools' curricula. Murray also argues that academic presses protected feminist writers from publishing trends in the 1980s such as corporate consolidation and mounting production costs.

== Significance and impact ==
WIP publications and bookstores served as "maps of the women's liberation movement" where women could find feminist texts and connect with other feminists and lesbians. This was particularly significant for women in rural and conservative areas, where information about feminism, women's health, and lesbianism could be difficult to find. Many women discovered feminist and lesbian communities through WIP publications, which often featured event calendars and open invitations to contribute their writings and time to the cause. At a higher level, WIP texts disseminated information about the women's liberation movement, educated and recruited women who were new to feminism, and provided outlets for discussing local, regional, and national issues. WIP publications also contributed to the formation of collective feminist and lesbian identities. Scholars study them to trace patterns in the development and spread of different strands of feminist thought and rhetoric.

WIP was especially important in the development of the women's health movement, which encouraged women to understand their bodies and advocate for their health. Feminist publications during this period often contained information about birth control, abortion, and home health examinations. Women organized health workshops, distributed informational texts, and established feminist health centers. Like WIP publications, many of these clinics were collectives. For example, the widely influential book Our Bodies, Ourselves began as a mimeographed booklet created by the Boston Women's Health Collective.

The movement also shaped popular understandings of feminism and the literary canon. In addition to reinvigorating interest in earlier women's writings through reprints, many popular and critically acclaimed feminist authors emerged out of WIP. Some, like Dorothy Allison, resented being treated as newcomers by the mainstream literary establishment when small presses and feminist networks had supported their earlier works for many years. In 1995, Allison, Alice Walker, Blanche McCrary Boyd, Jewelle Gomez, and Tee Corinne signed a "feminist writers pledge" acknowledging the importance of feminist presses and bookstores.

== Historiography ==
Feminist scholars have observed that WIP is understudied and identified various reasons for this gap. Flannery has proposed that in the popular imagination, the women's liberation movement is mostly associated with face-to-face events such as protests and consciousness raising group meetings. This draws focus away from the critical role the printed word played in the movement. She also suggests that "publishing is left out of historical studies of feminism because practices of literacy, particularly book publishing, are tainted by their relationship to the power structure."

Others opine that feminist print cultures have been ignored because of their interdisciplinary status. WIP's association with cultural feminism may also be a deterrent. Radical feminists such as Alice Echols have criticized cultural feminism for deradicalizing the women's liberation movement and retreating from patriarchy instead of dismantling it.

Not all scholarship concerning feminist and lesbian print cultures during the women's liberation movement uses the terminology "women in print movement." Julie R. Enszer objects to the term because she views feminist print culture as inextricably linked to the women's liberation movement, rather than a separate movement or submovement.

== Archives ==
Archives that hold significant WIP collections include the June L. Mazer Lesbian Archives, the Hormel Center at the San Francisco Public Library, the GLBT Historical Society, the Lesbian Herstory Archive, and the Lesbian Poetry Archive.

Wanderground Lesbian Archive and Library in Cranston, Rhode Island collects WIP and other lesbian materials with a particular focus on New England. The name was inspired by The Wanderground, Sally Miller Gearhart's speculative fiction novel published by Persephone Press.

Invisible Histories is a queer community archive that holds some WIP publications from the Deep South.

== Bibliography ==
- Adams, Kate (1998). "Built Out of Books: Lesbian Energy and Feminist Ideology in Alternative Publishing". Journal of Homosexuality. 34 (3–4): 113–141. doi:10.1300/J082v34n03_07.
- Arnold, June (1976). "Feminist Presses and Feminist Politics". Quest. 3 (1).
- Arnold, Roberta. "My Mother Was Many Things". Southern Lesbian Feminist Activist Herstory Project. Archived from the original on October 3, 2024.
- Beins, Agatha (2015). "A Revolution in Ephemera: Feminist Newsletters and Newspapers of the 1970s". In Harker, Jaime; Farr, Cecilia Konchar (eds.). This Book Is an Action: Feminist Print Culture and Activist Aesthetics. University of Illinois Press. pp. 46–65. ISBN 9780252039805.
- Beins, Agatha (2017). Liberation in Print: Feminist Periodicals and Social Movement Identity. University of Georgia Press. ISBN 9780820349534.
- Beins, Agatha; Enszer, Julie R. (2013). "'We Couldn't Get Them Printed, So We Learned to Print': Ain't I a Woman? and the Iowa City Women's Press". Frontiers: A Journal of Women's Studies. 34 (2): 186–221. doi:10.1353/fro.2013.a520041.
- Brody, Michal (1985). Are We There Yet? : A Continuing History of Lavender Woman, a Chicago Lesbian Newspaper, 1971-1976. Aunt Lute Books. ISBN 0918040078.
- Enszer, Julie R. (2013). The Whole Naked Truth of Our Lives: Lesbian-Feminist Print Culture from 1969 through 1989 (PhD thesis). University of Maryland College Park.
- Enszer, Julie R. (2015). "'What Made Us Think They'd Pay Us for Making a Revolution?': Women in Distribution (WinD), 1974–1979". In Harker, Jaime; Farr, Cecilia Konchar (eds.). This Book Is an Action: Feminist Print Culture and Activist Aesthetics. University of Illinois Press. pp. 66–86. ISBN 9780252039805.
- Enszer, Julie R. (2015). "Night Heron Press and Lesbian Print Culture in North Carolina, 1976-1983". Southern Cultures. 21 (2): 43–56. doi:10.1353/scu.2015.0021.
- Flannery, Kathryn Thoms (2005). Feminist Literacies, 1968-75. University of Illinois Press. ISBN 9780252077289.
- Forster, Laurel (2016). "Spreading the Word: Feminist Print Cultures and the Women's Liberation Movement". Women's History Review. 25 (5): 812–831. doi:10.1080/09612025.2015.1132878.
- Forster, Laurel (2025). "Feminist Print Culture in the 1970s: A Broadening and Deepening Field". Journal of Women's History. 37 (3): 141–149. doi:10.1353/jowh.2025.a967866.
- Gilley, Jennifer (2015). "Feminist Publishing/Publishing Feminism: Experimentation in Second-Wave Book Publishing". In Harker, Jaime; Farr, Cecilia Konchar (eds.). This Book Is an Action: Feminist Print Culture and Activist Aesthetics. University of Illinois Press. pp. 23–45. ISBN 9780252039805.
- Gould, Lois (January 2, 1977). "Creating a Women's World". The New York Times.
- Harker, Jaime (2018). The Lesbian South: Southern Feminists, the Women in Print Movement, and the Queer Literary Canon. University of North Carolina Press. ISBN 9781469643359.
- Harker, Jaime; Farr, Cecilia Konchar (2015). "Introduction". In Harker, Jaime; Farr, Cecilia Konchar (eds.). This Book Is an Action: Feminist Print Culture and Activist Aesthetics. University of Illinois Press. pp. 23–45. ISBN 9780252039805.
- Huisman, Marijka; van Vught, Inge Frank (2024). "Women in Print: Transnational Circulation of Idea(l)s from a Dutch Perspective". In Andeweg, Agnes; Kurvinen, Heidi (eds.). Transnational Feminism in Non-English Speaking Europe, c. 1960–1990. Palgrave Macmillan. pp. 135–154. ISBN 9783031691386.
- Invisible Histories. "What We Do". Archived from the original on February 18, 2026.
- Klinger, Alisa (1995). Paper Uprisings: Print Activism in the Multicultural Lesbian Movement (PhD thesis). University of California Berkeley.
- Lesbian Poetry Archive. "Lesbian Poetry Archive".
- Luker, Trish (2019). "Women into Print: Feminist Presses in Australia". In Arrow, Michelle; Woollacott, Angela (eds.). Everyday Revolutions: Remaking Gender, Sexuality and Culture in 1970s Australia. Australian National University Press. pp. 121–138. ISBN 9781760462970.
- Murray, Simone (2004). Mixed Media: Feminist Presses and Publishing Politics. Pluto. ISBN 9780745320151.
- Onosako, Junko R. (2006). Feminist Revolution in Literacy: Women's Bookstores in the United States. New York: Routledge. ISBN 9780203959565.
- Poland, Louise (2003). "The Devil and the Angel?: Australia's Feminist Presses and the Multinational Agenda". Hecate. 29 (2): 123–139.
- Riley, Catherine (2018). The Virago Story: Assessing the Impact of a Feminist Publishing Phenomenon. Berghahn. ISBN 9781785338083.
- Seager, Joni (2003–2004). "Overview: The 'Women in Print' Movement and Its Status Today". Media Report to Women. 31 (2): 5–10. ISSN 0145-9651.
- Smith, Barbara (1989). "A Press of Our Own Kitchen Table". Frontiers. 10 (3): 11. doi:10.2307/3346433. JSTOR 3346433.
- Travis, Trysh (2008). "The Women in Print Movement: History and Implications". Book History. 11 (1): 275–300. doi:10.1353/bh.0.0001.
- Wanderground Lesbian Archive and Library. "Collections". Archived from the original on October 4, 2024.
