= A Woman's Place =

A Woman's Place may refer to:

== Film and television ==
- Woman's Place, a 1921 American silent film
- A Woman's Place (film), a 2020 documentary film
- "A Woman's Place" (Blue Heelers), the first episode of the series
- "A Woman's Place" (The Handmaid's Tale), the sixth episode of the series
- "A Woman's Place" (Time Gentlemen Please), the first episode of the programme

== Books ==
- A Woman's Place, a booklet by Selma James in 1953
- Annapurna, A Woman's Place, a book by Arlene Blum

== Other uses ==
- A Woman's Place (bookstore), a feminist bookstore in Oakland, California
- Woman's Place UK, a trans-exclusionary feminist pressure group in the UK
