= New Words Bookstore =

Feminist bookstore in Cambridge, Massachusetts (1974-2002)

Coordinates: 42.3725°N 71.0995°W

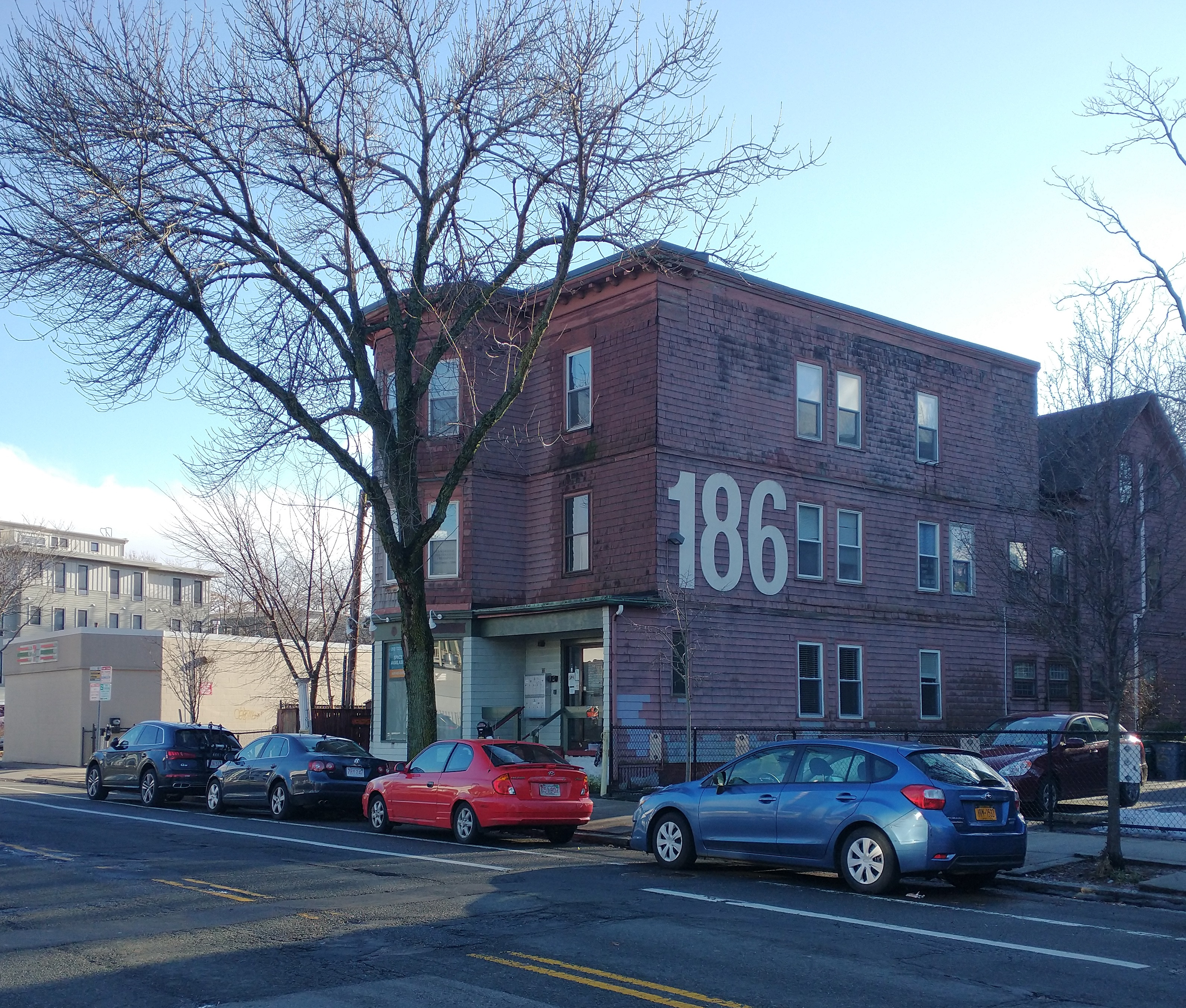
186 Hampshire Street in Cambridge, Massachusetts, in January 2022. This building was the location of the New Words bookstore beginning in 1976.

New Words Bookstore was a feminist bookstore based in Cambridge, Massachusetts. It opened in 1974, one of the first feminist bookstores in the United States, and moved to larger premises two years later. It gained an international reputation, and by 1989 was the largest feminist bookstore in the U.S. in terms of sales. After the bookstore closed in 2002, the Center for New Words (CNW) continued its legacy until this organization closed its doors in 2008 and some of its activities were undertaken by Women, Action & the Media (WAM!).

== History ==
=== Early years ===
New Words, A Women's Bookstore, opened in Somerville, Massachusetts, on April 6, 1974. New Words was one of the earliest feminist bookstores in the country and a pioneer in the women in print movement, an international effort by second-wave feminists to establish autonomous communication networks created by and for women.

The four founders, Rita Arditti, Gilda Bruckman, Mary Lowry, and Jean MacRae were brought together through introductions made by mutual friends. Rita Arditti was a biologist, Gilda Bruckman worked in a Harvard Square bookstore, Mary Lowry was an optician, and Jean MacRae was just finishing a graduate degree at Harvard Divinity School. Together, with pooled funds of $15,000, they created one of the first women's spaces in the Boston area. The bookstore first opened its doors at 419 Washington Street, Somerville.

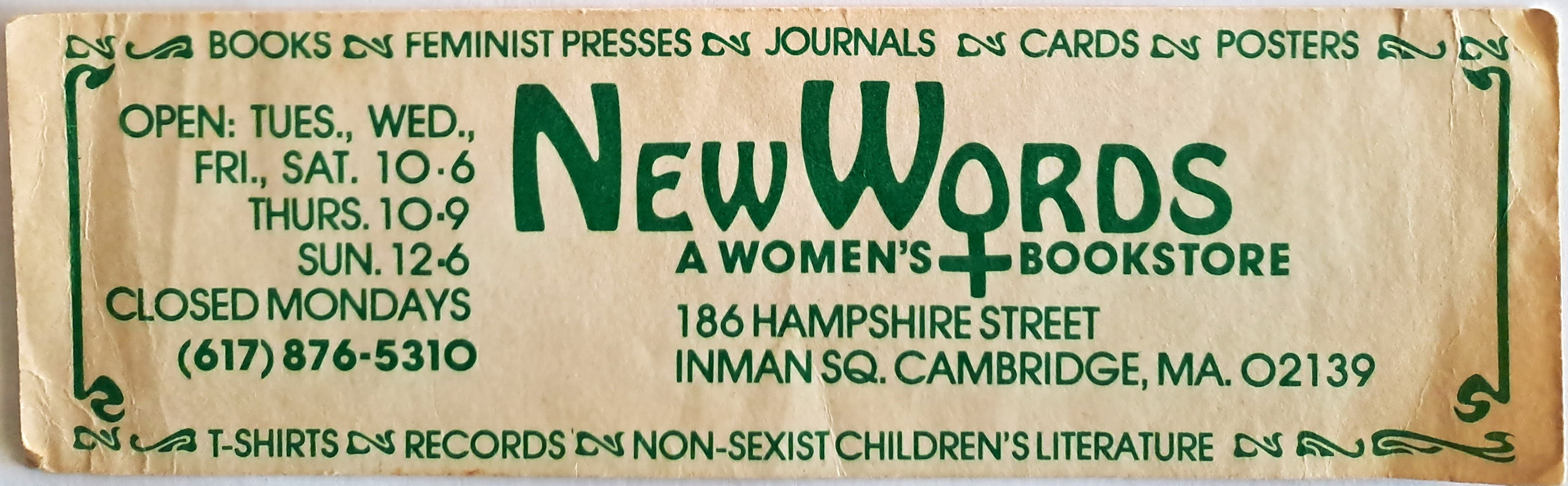
New Words bookmark, c.1980

In January 1976, New Words moved to a bigger space at 186 Hampshire St, Cambridge (Inman Square), in what was then a hot spot of feminist activity. In addition to New Words, the Hampshire Street building housed the Goddard Cambridge Graduate Program in Women's Studies, Focus—a feminist counseling collective, and the Boston Federal Feminist Credit Union. Two blocks further along Hampshire Street was the Women's Community Health Center (feminist health centers), and across the street from that, the women's restaurant, Bread & Roses. A few doors up the street in the other direction was Gypsy Wagon, a women-owned craft store. The Cambridge Women's Center was within walking distance.

By the mid-1980s, the New Words collective had expanded to include Madge Kaplan, Kate Rushin, Laura Zimmerman, Doris Reisig, and Joni Seager.

=== 1990s–2002 ===
By the late 1990s, shifts in bookselling, including the emergence of online bookselling and the growth of large chain bookstores affected the viability of women's and other independent bookstores. By 1998, additionally, other feminist establishments in Inman Square (the neighborhood of Cambridge in which New Words was located) had closed, with the exception of Focus Counseling. This resulted in a diminishing customer presence.

To meet these new challenges, in 1998, the bookstore's co-owners created New Words Live, a non-profit organization, to provide support for the cultural programming that had previously been under the auspices of the bookstore. In addition to continuing the author series, New Words Live programming included a music series (New Words Unplugged) and open mic poetry sessions.

In October 2000, New Words Live received a grant from the Ford Foundation to explore possible models for the future of feminist bookstores in the United States, paying particular attention to arrangements that would enhance and build on their broad cultural and political roles. New Words' Board and owners worked to translate their expertise and community trust into a self-supporting nonprofit group. Owing to community support and the Ford Foundation grant, when the bookstore closed in 2002, the Center for New Words (CNW) carried on in the shop's wake.

=== Women authors at New Words ===
From the beginning, the collective wanted the bookstore to be a forum for women to discuss new ideas and new writings. Book-related programming was at the heart of the bookstore and represented the literary-political edge of feminism. Author visits were often high-profile, and well-attended. Over the years, readings at the store brought authors such as Dorothy Allison, Julia Alvarez, Ellen Bass, Alison Bechdel, Robin Becker, Kate Clinton, Blanche Wiesen Cook, Mary Daly, Edwidge Danticat, Barbara Ehrenreich, Cynthia Enloe, Eve Ensler, Lillian Faderman, Leslie Feinberg, Carol Gilligan, Jane Hamilton, Judith Lewis Herman, bell hooks, June Jordan, Audre Lorde, Robin Morgan, Tillie Olsen, Grace Paley, Pat Parker, Marge Piercy, Judith Plaskow, Minnie Bruce Pratt, Adrienne Rich, May Sarton, Marjane Satrapi, Alix Kates Shulman, Barbara Smith, Gloria Steinem, Wendy Wasserstein, Jennifer Weiner, among dozens of others, to Boston-area audiences.

== Background, context and impact ==
=== Feminist cultural movements ===
Feminist bookstores were integral to the second wave of feminism. Starting in the early 1970s, women's newspapers, magazines, journals, and independent presses proliferated, and women's bookstores started to open—at first in only a few major cities, and then throughout the country. Among the earliest of these were A Woman's Place in Oakland, Labyris Books and Womanbooks in New York City (1972), Charis in Atlanta (1973), Toronto Women's Bookstore in Canada (1973), Amazon Bookstore in Minneapolis (1974), and New Words in Cambridge (1974). New Words was one of the original members of the Feminist Bookstore Network, a North American network of feminist bookstores founded by Carol Seajay in 1976. By the late 1980s, there were more than 120 feminist bookstores in the US and Canada and a decade later, there were 175. By 1989, New Words ranked as "the largest feminist bookstore in the country in terms of dollar sales".

=== Women in Print Movement ===
New Words was part of the flourishing feminist women in print movement and cultural revolution in the mid-1970s. Women started producing music, newspapers, magazines, opened publishing houses, and forged national and international political and social networks. The bookstore's shelves were filled with offerings from Daughters Inc., Diana Press, Persephone Press, Alice James Books, Naiad Press, Firebrand Books, Seal Press, Alta Press, Feminist Press, Virago Press, Crossing Press, Spinster's Ink Press, and Kitchen Table: Women of Color Press, among dozens of other feminist and lesbian presses. Small pamphlet publishers such as New England Free Press paved the way for the 'zine revolution two decades later. Women's newspapers in Boston alone included Sojourner, Sister Courage, Equal Times, and, later, the Women's Review of Books. National magazines such as Second Wave and No More Fun and Games from Cell 16 were published locally. Gay Community News, another Boston-based publication, reported on feminist and lesbian and gay communities. The bookstore helped break ground on many social issues. Mainstream publishers began to look to women's bookstores for issues and trends, and New Words was one of those bookstores from whom publishers sought that type of direction. It was one of the first bookstores in Boston with a large nonsexist children's book section and featured books on children in what were then considered non-traditional families and children with disabilities; its lesbian fiction section held hundreds of titles; it was one of the few sources for writings on women and violence. New Words was one of the few venues in Boston where Black feminism was made visible; the store was a significant outlet for the writings of the Combahee River Collective and for Kitchen Table: Women of Color Press, and housed an extensive "African American" section. The international linkages of the bookstore were evident in the range of offerings—New Words' journal shelves included Manushi (India), Femme (Mexico), and Spare Rib (UK). The store featured international women writers of both fiction and nonfiction, from Bessie Head to Nawal El Saadawi.

New Words also became a pivotal Boston-area focal point for political organizing, feminist discussion groups, self-help groups, and cultural programming. New Words made its Reading Room available to community groups for meetings. The Alliance Against Sexual Coercion (see Sexual Harassment), the original organizing committee for the Boston Women's Fund, Moving Violations, the Boston Dyke March planning committee, Rainbow Café (a gathering of queer women in academia), and a group for transgender writers, among many others, met regularly at New Words.

By the mid-1980s, the bookstore became a bridge between activists and women's studies programs, supplying titles for many of the new women's studies courses. Women's Studies instructors and their students relied on the store to find the latest publications in their fields; many local Women's Studies instructors organized field trips to the store for their classes.

== Recognition, awards and legacy ==
Over the years, New Words garnered numerous awards and recognitions: it received official commendations from the City of Cambridge; it received the 1998 "Small Business Award" from the Greater Boston Business Council, the 1998 "Rosemary Dunn Dalton Award for Service to Women" from the Lesbian and Gay Political Alliance of Massachusetts, and the "Women in Business" award from the Boston chapter of the National Organization for Women. Gilda Bruckman was honored with the "Astraea Foundation Independent Spirit Award" for 1999. This award, established by Dorothy Allison in 1998, recognized "individuals or groups whose work with small presses and independent bookstores has been central to supporting writers and introducing readers to works that might otherwise go unheard and unread."

Both New Words Bookstore's and the Center for New Words' papers are housed in the Schlesinger Library, Radcliffe Institute, Harvard University, Cambridge, Massachusetts.

== After closure of the bookstore ==
=== The Center for New Words ===
As the bookstore closed its doors, it shifted the cultural and political programming that had been the hallmark of the bookstore to a new free-standing, non-profit entity, the Center for New Words (CNW), under the directorship of Gilda Bruckman, Joni Seager, and Laura Zimmerman; Jaclyn Friedman, the programming director in the bookstore, continued on as programming director for CNW.

With office and event space located in the Cambridge YWCA in the heart of Central Square, CNW's mission was to encourage diverse women's engagement with the entire "word cycle", from literacy to literary writing to opinion making in the media. Nearly all programs were offered free of charge. Many programs were offered in collaboration with other local and national feminist and social justice groups.

Continuing New Words' tradition of readings with feminist authors, CNW featured Marjane Satrapi, Robin Morgan, Suzan-Lori Parks, Dorothy Allison and dozens of others; in partnership with WGBH, many readings were now web streamed to listeners and viewers across the globe. CNW's new local programs and projects included a monthly spoken-word open mic; a cable television show with local feminist writers; a discussion series, Feminism and Dessert (picked up by the Cambridge Women's Commission), feminist writing workshops with instructors such as Patricia Powell and Michelle Tea; book groups on the subject of feminism and undoing racism; and a weekly writing group with women at On The Rise, a safe haven day program for homeless women in Cambridge. This writing group, begun in 2003, has continued to meet under the direction of Gilda Bruckman.

CNW also initiated "Taking Our Place in the Public Conversation", a project that aimed to redress the post-9/11 erasure of feminist views and opinions from the media and public discourse. It included readings and discussions with Anne Garrels, Laura Flanders, Mary Frances Berry, Molly Ivins, and other prominent public affairs authors, activists, and commentators; and a series of forums on issues ignored by the mainstream media, such as women in Afghanistan, led with Saira Shah; and "frontline" war reporting in Sri Lanka and Afghanistan, with Anita Pratap.

=== Women, Action, and the Media (WAM!) ===
In 2004, this project also generated the Women Action & the Media (WAM!) conference, co-founded by Laura Zimmerman and Jaclyn Friedman. CNW had reached a crossroads, as had the culture at large: media increasingly dominated politics and society; digital sources were overtaking print; and an absence of women in the media had helped galvanize a new generation of feminists. In 2008, CNW's co-directors, staff, and board (under the leadership of Chairs Elyse Cherry, succeeded by Tina Brand), closed CNW's doors as an organization devoted to multiple local and regional feminist activities. Instead, it channeled its resources and support into the soon-to-be autonomous entity of Women, Action, & the Media (WAM!).

== Similar organizations ==
- Amazon Bookstore Cooperative
- Toronto Women's Bookstore
- Silver Moon Bookshop

== See also ==
- Feminism
- Feminist movement
- Women in print movement
- Lesbian literature
- List of lesbian periodicals
