= Sinister Wisdom =

American lesbian quarterly of art and literature since 1976

- Editor: Julie R. Enszer
- Categories: Literary, art
- Frequency: Quarterly
- Publisher: Sinister Wisdom Inc.
- First issue: 1976; 50 years ago
- Country: United States
- Based in: Dover, Florida
- Website: sinisterwisdom.org
- ISSN: 0196-1853
- OCLC: 3451636

Sinister Wisdom is a multicultural lesbian literary and art journal founded in 1976. Publishing four issues a year, the journal's mission is to "create multi-class, multicultural, multi-gender, multi-racial, worldwide intergenerational queer and lesbian spaces." Sinister Wisdom features fiction, essays, poetry, literary criticism, art, and feminist theory. Founded in Charlotte, North Carolina, by Catherine Nicholson and Harriet Ellenberger (also known as Harriet Desmoines), it is the longest-running lesbian feminist literary and art journal and one of the few surviving community-based journals from the women's liberation movement.

Sinister Wisdom has its roots in lesbian separatism and the women in print movement, which sought to establish autonomous communications networks of periodicals, publishers, and bookstores created by and for women. As a result, the journal accepts submissions from both novice and experienced writers and has worked with woman-owned and operated presses such as Whole Women Press and Iowa City Women's Press. With over 130 issues, it is one of the longest-running lesbian journals. Sinister Wisdom has published works by Audre Lorde, Adrienne Rich, Maureen Brady, Minnie Bruce Pratt, and Alison Bechdel. Sapphic Classics, a partnership between Sinister Wisdom and A Midsummer Night's Press, reprints classic lesbian works for contemporary audiences.

== Journal contents and scope ==
Sinister Wisdom publishes four issues per year and features art, photography, short stories, personal accounts, poems, interviews, feminist and queer theory, and literature reviews. The journal features primarily lesbians' work, particularly writing, art, or photography that reflects a diversity of experiences, including but not limited to lesbians of color, ethnic lesbians, Jewish, Arab, old, young, working-class, poverty-class, disabled, and fat lesbians. Each issue of Sinister Wisdom is different in content and structure, especially in the case of special issues. Each issue includes a call for submissions, and a column called "Notes for a Magazine" is written by the editor(s) of each issue. The back of the journal usually contains classified ads, particularly for feminist bookstores. Since 1981, Sinister Wisdom has made subscriptions free to women in prison.

Sinister Wisdom contributed to the development of an avant-garde lesbian aesthetic, especially in its early history when it was associated with June Arnold and Daughters, Inc. Although the journal has always focused on the work of lesbians, it has also published works of "lesbian imagination" by cisgender heterosexual women such as Sharon Olds and Susan Brownmiller, transgender lesbians, and other queer women. According to current editor Julie R. Enszer, some women have canceled their subscriptions because they disagree with the journal's evolving understanding of gender and sexuality.

== History ==
In 1976, Catherine Nicholson and Harriet Ellenberger (also known as Harriet Desmoines), two lesbians from Charlotte, North Carolina, attended a lesbian writing workshop in Knoxville, Tennessee, with the idea of a lesbian literary journal already in mind. Nicholson and Ellenberger had been inspired by earlier lesbian publications such as The Ladder and Amazon Quarterly to create their own journal for Southern lesbians. After attending the workshop, Nicholson and Ellenberger created a leaflet advertising the new journal and putting out an open call for submissions. Ellenberger in particular called for "revolution, reversal, and transformation" and wanted a place that was outside the patriarchal realm for lesbians to communicate and express themselves. Sinister Wisdom was named after novelist and later Sinister Wisdom contributor Joanna Russ's novel The Female Man. "Sinister" in this context means "on the left side", which is in direct contrast with the "right": the patriarchal, "rational" values that dominate society and seek to oppress the left.

In her first "Notes for a Magazine" editorial column, Ellenberger wrote:

The Law of the Fathers equates "right-over-left, white-over-black, heterosexual-over-homosexual, and male-over-female with good-over-evil." Sinister Wisdom turns these patriarchal values upside down as a necessary prelude to creating our own.

Ellenberger believed that lesbians writing and publishing for lesbians outside the traditional, patriarchal realm was the best way to connect to their audience. Her ideas aligned with lesbian feminism and the women in print movement. June Arnold, founder of feminist press Daughters, Inc., and organizer of the 1976 Women in Print Conference, supported the creation of Sinister Wisdom and may have helped fund the journal. In addition to separatist content, the journal took a grassroots approach and utilized only the talents, time, and money of women. This was in deliberate opposition to the mainstream press and publishing industries, which were dominated by men.

The first issue of Sinister Wisdom, edited by Nicholson and Ellenberger, was released on July 4, 1976. The journal promised three issues a year, with subscriptions costing $4.50. The journal's first issue did not have a theme; because of the open call for submissions, the contents were diverse in subject and style.

The first issue included the following manifesto:

We’re lesbians living in the South. We’re white; sometimes unemployed, sometimes working part- time. We’re a generation apart. . . . A nightmare reveals our fears: Catherine dreams that she wakes next to me. I’m holding slides of mutilated bodies and soundlessly screaming. Catherine looks up at the blank TV. A single open eye stares at us from the screen. So why take chances? Because we needed more to read on, to feed on, more writing to satisfy our greedy maws. We’d become lesbian separatists because no other political position satisfied. But that left us with scattered beginnings of a culture and no viable strategy. We believed with the CLIT papers that consciousness is women’s greatest strength, and we both responded strongly to Mary Daly’s call for “ludic cerebration, the free play of intuition in our own space, giving rise to thinking that is vigorous, informed, multidimensional, in de pen dent, creative, tough.” But how to think that keenly and imaginatively, how to develop that consciousness?

The first issue was well-received, but Nicholson and Ellenberger initially only had enough funds to publish the journal for one year. In 1975, June Arnold participated in a Modern Language Association special session on lesbian writers. The proceedings were originally going to be edited by Beth Hodges and published in the journal Margins, but Arnold insisted that Sinister Wisdom should publish them as a special issue instead. The decision was controversial, and the second issue of Sinister Wisdom, released in the fall of 1976, included a letter from Hodges claiming that she was bullied into having her work published in the journal. Nonetheless, the issue sold out.

By Issue 7, Nicholson and Ellenberger introduced some changes: the cost of subscriptions raised from $4.50 to $7.50, the number of issues released in the year raised from three to four, and Sinister Wisdom's publishing headquarters moved from Charlotte to Lincoln, Nebraska. In Lincoln, Julia Penelope provided them support from the University of Nebraska Lincoln. Sinister Wisdom editors worked with Iowa City Women's Press and Whole Women Press, both associated with the separatist women in print movement. To remain an independent publication, the editors had to pay for their office space, supplies, printing, and mailing out of pocket. Ellenberger continued to urge readers to buy subscriptions for those who could not afford it, buy gift subscriptions, or donate directly to Sinister Wisdom.

Exhausted by the strains of editing and producing the journal, by 1978 Nicholson and Ellenberger began looking for women to replace them. At a party dedicated to female publishing in New York City, the two spoke with Adrienne Rich and Michelle Cliff, both former Sinister Wisdom contributors. The pair decided to take on the project. Nicholson and Ellenberger's final issue was Issue 16 in the winter of 1981, published from the journal's new headquarters in Amherst, Massachusetts. Rich and Cliff promised to commit themselves to sustaining the quality of publications Sinister Wisdom was known for. As an activist and writer of color, Cliff noted in her first "Notes for a Magazine" column that she was interested in including more submissions dealing with the intersections of race and lesbianism. The journal from Issue 17 of the spring of 1981 was the start of a more intersectional journal, moving away from separatism and towards the inclusion of other forms of oppression that coincide with the experiences of lesbian women.

In the summer of 1983, Rich and Cliff published their final issue at Sinister Wisdom, and the journal was turned over to Michaele Uccella and Melanie Kaye/Kantrowitz.

By Issue 33, the magazine was turned over to notable feminist writer Elana Dykewomon. Dykewomon promised in this first issue as editor that she would work towards getting Sinister Wisdom to be recognized as a non-profit organization. Dykewomon also became the publisher of the journal. By the spring of 1992, with the release of Issue 46, Sinister Wisdom, Inc. received their 501(c)(3) from the government, recognizing the journal as a non-profit organization.

Issue 55, published as the spring and summer issue for 1995, was edited by Caryatis Cardea, Jamie Lee Evans, and Sauda Burch. The journal was then turned over to Akiba Onáda-Sikwoia. Onáda-Sikwoia stated in her "Notes for a Magazine" column that she wanted to boost the number of subscriptions but that her efforts had not yielded the 400 new subscriptions she was hoping for. During this period, Sinister Wisdom began its practice of providing 80 free subscriptions to incarcerated lesbians.

In 1997, Onáda-Sikwoia turned the journal over to Margo Mercedes-Rivera-Weiss, who would edit the journal until 2000. Fran Day, a feminist writer active in the lesbian community, worked as the editor from 2000 until her death in 2010. Merry Gangemi was the editor from 2010 until 2013. The current editor is Julie R. Enszer, who works with a board of directors and a variety of guest editors. In recent years, editorial staff have focused on cultivating intergenerational relationships of lesbian and queer women in the selection of the board of directors, the composition of editorial collectives for special issues, and the selection of works for publication. In 2014, the journal received the Michele Karlsberg Leadership Award from the Publishing Triangle.

As of 2025, Sinister Wisdom continues to operate as an independent nonprofit. Most of its funding comes from individual subscriptions and charitable donations. The journal is supported by interns and volunteer editors and copyeditors.

=== Impact and significance ===
Sinister Wisdom is the longest-running lesbian feminist literary and art journal and one of the few surviving periodicals from the women's liberation movement and women in print movement. It contributed significantly to the formation of Southern lesbian culture and intergenerational lesbian communities. Along with other feminist periodicals, it created "maps of the women's liberation movement" where women could find feminist texts and connect with other feminists and lesbians, particularly through the wanted ads and event calendars. These publications also contributed to the formation of collective feminist and lesbian identities. Scholars study them to trace patterns in the development and spread of different strands of feminist thought and rhetoric.

=== Special issues ===
Several of the journal's issues have been dedicated to highlighting the experiences of lesbians from specific cultural, racial, religious, and class backgrounds.

- Issue 22/23, "A Gathering of Spirit", dedicated to Native/Indigenous women’s writings and edited by Beth Brant.
- Issues 29/30, "Tribe of Dina: A Jewish Women's Anthology", were published in 1986. This iteration of the journal highlights the experiences and creations of Jewish lesbians, including editor Elana Dykewomon.
- Issue 39, "On Disability", was published in Winter 1989/1990.
- Issue 41, "Il Viaggio Delle Donne: Italian-American Women Reach Shore", was published in Summer/Fall 1990.
- Issue 45, "Lesbians & Class", was published in Winter 1991/1992.
- Issue 53, "Old Lesbians/Dykes", was published in Summer/Fall 1994. Works featured in the journal highlight the experiences of lesbians over the age of sixty, specifically dealing with topics such as sexuality, ageism, family, and death. In Winter 2009/2010, issues 78 & 79 were published as a sequel to the 1994 issue in a collection entitled "Old Lesbians/Dykes II".
- Issue 54, "Lesbians and Religion", addresses the experiences of lesbians from a number of religious and spiritual backgrounds.
- Issue 74, "Latina Lesbians," edited by Juanita Ramos
- Issue 97, "Out Latina Lesbians", was published in Summer 2015. This issue, edited by Nívea Castro and Geny Cabral, highlights the experiences of Latina lesbians and includes a number of pieces written in English, Spanish, or a mixture of both.
- Issue 107, "Black Lesbians—We Are the Revolution!", amplifies the voices of African-American lesbians and queer women. This issue includes discussions of black and queer activism and the ways in which it is or isn't effective, and calls upon black lesbian/queer creatives to imagine a brighter future for activism.
- Issue 119: To Be a Jewish Dyke in the Twenty-First Century

=== Archives ===
Archives related to the founding and early history of Sinister Wisdom are preserved in the Catherine Nicholson papers at the Duke University library.

Sinister Wisdom, in agreement with Reveal Media, is in the process of digitizing back issues from 1976 to 2001. In this agreement, Sinister Wisdom has made these back issues available on its website as downloadable PDFs to increase accessibility to lesbian literary content for readers.

== Editors and publishers ==
- Harriet Ellenberger (aka Harriet Desmoines) and Catherine Nicholson (1976–1981)
- Michelle Cliff and Adrienne Rich (1981–1983)
- Michaele Uccella (1983–1984)
- Melanie Kaye/Kantrowitz (1983–1987)
- Elana Dykewomon (1987–1994)
- Caryatis Cardea (1991–1994)
- Akiba Onada-Sikwoia (1995–1997)
- Margo Mercedes Rivera-Weiss (1997–2000)
- Fran Day (2000–2011)
- Julie R. Enszer & Merry Gangemi (2010–2013)
- Julie R. Enszer (2013 to present)

== Notable contributors ==
- Alison Bechdel – cartoonist and writer
- Audre Lorde – notable poet, essayist, and activist
- Adrienne Rich – poet, writer, and activist
- Anita Cornwell – writer
- Susan Hawthorne – writer, poet, publisher
- Joanna Russ – novelist
- June Arnold – novelist, publisher, and activist
- Elana Dykewomon – poet, novelist, editor, and activist
- Maureen Brady – writer and editor
- Minnie Bruce Pratt – poet, activist, and teacher
- Deena Metzger – writer
- Michelle Cliff – writer and literary critic
- Pat Parker – poet

== Other publications ==
In 2013, Sinister Wisdom began reprinting classic lesbian literature and poetry publications for a new audience to enjoy under Sapphic Classics. This initiative is in partnership with A Midsummer Night's Press, an independent publishing company specializing in poetry. Often these publications serve as an issue of Sinister Wisdom.

- Crime Against Nature by Minnie Bruce Pratt, Sinister Wisdom, Issue 88. This collection of stories and poems detailed Pratt's loss of custody of her two children when she came out as a lesbian. This book won Pratt the 1989 James Laughlin Award.
- Living as a Lesbian by Cheryl Clarke, Sinister Wisdom, Issue 91. This personal account details Clarke's life as a lesbian and pays tribute to women.
- What Can I Ask-New and Selected Poems 1975–2014 by Elana Dykewomon, Sinister Wisdom, Issue 96. This collection is the compiled poems and works of Elana Dykewomon.
- The Complete Works of Pat Parker, Sinister Wisdom, Issue 102. This collection is chosen works of Pat Parker. This collection won the Lambda Literary Award.
- For the Hard Ones: A Lesbian Phenomenology (Para las duras: Una fenomenología lesbiana) by Tatiana de la Tierre, Sinister Wisdom 108. This collection is a compilation of poetry exploring queer Latina sexuality in both Spanish and English.
- The Pagoda: A Lesbian Community by the Sea by Rose Norman, Sinister Wisdom Issue 131. This book uses interviews, photos, and research to document the history of The Pagoda lesbian community that existed in St. Augustine, Florida.

Other publications:

- A Gathering of Spirit (Expanded) - This is an expanded version of the popular Issue 22/23, which showcases the work of Native American lesbians.

== See also ==
- Lesbian feminism
- Lesbian literature
- List of lesbian periodicals
- Women in print movement
