= Old Wives Tales (bookstore) =

Feminist bookstore in San Francisco, California, United States

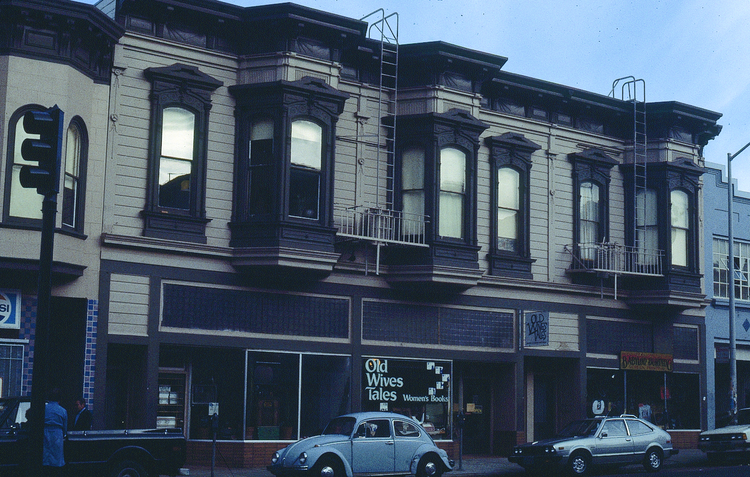
- Old Wives Tales at 1009 Valencia Street (photo taken in 1983)
- Formation: October 31, 1976; 49 years ago
- Founder: Carol Seajay, Paula Wallace
- Dissolved: October 1995; 31 years ago
- Type: Feminist bookstore

Old Wives Tales (also Old Wives' Tales) was a feminist bookstore in the Mission Dolores neighborhood of San Francisco. It was founded on October 31, 1976, by Carol Seajay and Paula Wallace, a lesbian couple. It closed permanently in October 1995.

== History ==
Carol Seajay previously worked at Full Moon Cafe and Bookstore, a feminist cooperative bookstore in San Francisco. She attended the 1976 Women in Print Conference in Omaha, Nebraska, which brought together women working at feminist publications, presses, and bookstores. She founded Old Wives Tales a few months later, and the shop opened on October 31, 1976, at 532 Valencia Street. The shop was funded by a loan from the San Francisco Feminist Federal Credit Union. Both Old Wives Tales and Feminist Bookstore News, also founded by Seajay, became influential in the burgeoning women in print movement.

Old Wives Tales initially operated as a partnership between the founders. In 1978, Carol Seajay and Paula Wallace broke up, with Wallace moving away. The bookstore was moved to a new location at 1009 Valencia Street after the breakup, and Seajay restructured it to run as a worker cooperative.

In 1983, members of the worker collective incorporated Old Wives Tales as a nonprofit. Seajay resigned the same year.

In early 1991, the bookstore halved its floor space as a result of financial difficulties. In August 1993, Old Wives Tales reported additional financial trouble, with the collective seeking $25,000 in loans to continue operating the bookstore.

== Significance and legacy ==
Like many feminist bookstores, Old Wives Tales had an important role in fostering feminist and lesbian communities. Women went to feminist bookstores to meet each other, access books that were impossible to find elsewhere, and host events.

The Old Wives Tales records are held by the GLBT Historical Society archives in San Francisco.
