= Michele Karlsberg Leadership Award =

American literary award

- Awarded for: Outstanding support publishing LGBTQ books
- Sponsored by: Publishing Triangle
- Reward: US$500
- Established: 2016

The Michele Karlsberg Leadership Award, established in 2022 as the Publishing Triangle Leadership Award, is an annual literary award presented by The Publishing Triangle to editors, literary agents, and others who help quality books with LGBT+ content is published. Since 2016, winners have received a $500 prize.

In 2022, the award was named to honor Michele Karlsberg, one of Publishing Triangle's first co-chairs and co founder of Amethyst Press.

== Recipients ==
Award winners
Year	Winner	Ref.
2002	Michael Denneny (1943–2023): American editor and author, known as one of the first openly gay editors at a major publishing house	
2003	Jed Mattes (1952–2003): American literary agent who advocated for LGBT literature	
2004	Barbara Gittings (1932–2007): American librarian and LGBT rights activist	
2005	Lesbian Herstory Archives: American archive, community center, and museum dedicated to preserving lesbian history	
2006	Oscar Wilde Memorial Bookshop: American bookshop focused on LGBT works	
2007	Nancy Bereano (born 1942): American editor and publisher who founded Firebrand Books, a lesbian feminist press	
2008	Carol Seajay: American activist and former bookseller who founded Feminist Bookstore News	
2008	Richard Labonté (1949–2022): Canadian writer and editor, who edited numerous LGBT anthologies	
2009	Carole DeSanti	
2010	Michele Karlsberg	
2011	Gay and Lesbian Review: Magazine of history, culture, and politics for LGBT people and their allies	
2012	Frances Goldin (1924–2020): American housing rights activist and literary agent	
2013	Ira Silverberg (born 1963): American literary agent and editor	
2014	Sinister Wisdom: American lesbian quarterly of art and literature	
2015	—	
2016	Christopher Street: American gay-oriented magazine	
2017	John Scognamiglio	
2018	Malaga Baldi	
2019	Paul Willis	
2020	In Her Words: 20th Century Lesbian Fiction, a documentary by Project Legacies	
2021	William Johnson	
2022	Trent Duffy	
2023	Donnie Jochum and Greg Newton, co-founders of the Bureau of General Services – Queer Division	
2024	Kris Kleindienst, owner of Left Bank Books	
2025	David Groff, poet, writer, and Publishing Triangle co-founder	
2026	Amy Scholder, "literary editor, publisher, and documentary filmmaker"	
