= Amazon bookstore =

Amazon Bookstore may refer to:

- Amazon Bookstore Cooperative, a feminist bookstore in Minneapolis, Minnesota, US
- Amazon.com, Inc., a large internet retailer based in Seattle, Washington, US
  - Amazon Books, the retailer's first physical storefront in Seattle, Washington, US
