= It Ain't Me (disambiguation) =

"It Ain't Me" is a 2017 song by Norwegian DJ Kygo and American singer Selena Gomez.

It Ain't Me may also refer to:

- "Fortunate Son", a song by Creedence Clearwater Revival on the album Willy and the Poor Boys, 1969
- "It Ain't Me", a 2008 song by T-Pain featuring Akon and T.I. from Three Ringz

== See also ==
- It Ain't Me, Babe (disambiguation)
