= Feminist Bookstore News =

Trade publication for feminist bookstores

- Categories: trade publication
- Frequency: bimonthly, quarterly
- Founder: Carol Seajay
- Founded: 1976
- First issue: October 14, 1976
- Final issue: Summer 2000
- Based in: San Francisco, California, United States
- ISSN: 0741-6555
- OCLC: 10196440

Feminist Bookstore News (FBN) was a trade publication for feminist bookstores. It was active from 1976 until 2000, and issues were published sometimes bimonthly and sometimes quarterly. The publication was described by Tee Corinne as "the glue that kept women booksellers around the world together", acting as a network for feminist booksellers and publishers across the United States and transnationally.

== History ==
Feminist Bookstore News was founded by Carol Seajay after the First National Women in Print Conference, intended to help the community that had attended stay in touch with each other. The five largest feminist bookstores donated $100 each ($566 in 2025) to help start the publication. The first issue was published on October 14, 1976.

The publication began as a six-page mimeographed newsletter called Feminist Bookstores Newsletter, supported by funding from Womanbooks, Amazon Bookstore Cooperative, and New Words Bookstore. The name was changed to Feminist Bookstore News in 1984. By 1988 the publication was 48 pages long and issues were professionally printed roughly every two months.

As feminist bookstores became less common due to chain stores and online shopping, the subscriber count of FBN dropped, and publication eventually ceased in 2000.

== Activity ==
Book lists were common in FBN, with a focus on connecting readers with resources and supporting authors. Early list topics included “Native American Women,” “Black Women,” and “Young Women & Youth Liberation.”

After Toni Morrison's book The Bluest Eye went out of print in the mid-1970s, FBN promoted a campaign to demonstrate demand to publishers by writing them orders for large quantities of the book. The Bluest Eye was reissued in 1978. A similar effort took place with The Female Man by Joanna Russ, which went out of print in 1977 and was also re-released in 1978 after advocacy from feminist booksellers coordinated by FBN. This type of letter-writing campaign was often repeated in the publication.

FBN popularized the practice of sending a portion of profit to feminist authors when selling copies of their remaindered books, because authors did not receive royalties from publishers for these copies.

== Archives ==
The James C. Hormel LGBTQIA+ Center at the San Francisco Public Library holds the records of Feminist Bookstore News, comprising 84 boxes of materials. The collection includes raw materials for each issue, correspondence, catalogs, interviews, and materials from the Women in Print conferences.

A full catalog of FBN issues, including a searchable database of articles and supplemental material such as flyers and press releases, is available on the Lesbian Poetry Archive.

== Bibliography ==
- Hogan, Kristen (March 1, 2008). "Women's Studies in Feminist Bookstores: "All the Women's Studies women would come in"". Signs: Journal of Women in Culture and Society. 33 (3): 595–621. doi:10.1086/523707. ISSN 0097-9740. S2CID 144949497.
- Hogan, Kristen (2016). The Feminist Bookstore Movement: Lesbian Antiracism and Feminist Accountability. Durham [North Carolina]. ISBN 978-0-8223-6110-7. OCLC 915120533.
- Travis, Trysh (2008). "The Women in Print Movement: History and Implications". Book History. 11: 275–300. ISSN 1098-7371. JSTOR 30227421.
