= It Ain't Me Babe (disambiguation) =

"It Ain't Me Babe" is a song by Bob Dylan.

The title may also refer to:

- It Ain't Me Babe (album), album by The Turtles
- It Ain't Me Babe, album by The Surfaris
- It Ain't Me, Babe (comics), the first comic book produced entirely by women
- It Ain't Me, Babe (newspaper) a 1970s feminist newspaper in Berkeley, California
