= Carol Seajay =

American activist and bookseller

- Education: University of Michigan
- Known for: Feminist Bookstore News

Carol Seajay is an American activist and former bookseller. She cofounded the Old Wives Tales bookstore in San Francisco as well as the Feminist Bookstore News, which she edited and published for more than 20 years before ceasing publication in 2000. Her work was part of the women in print movement.

In 2008, Seajay received the Michele Karlsberg Leadership Award from the Publishing Triangle.

== Early life ==
Seajay attended higher education at the University of Michigan. During her last year in school she worked as an abortion counselor, but was fired after being outed as a lesbian, leading her to purchase a motorcycle on which she moved to the San Francisco Bay Area in 1974.

== Activity in the Bay Area ==
Upon arriving in San Francisco, Seajay attended classes at a free school in the area. She also joined a local feminist worker cooperative bookstore (the Full Moon Cafe and Bookstore), but it was eventually shut down because of unlicensed events.

Several months later Seajay was taken on a bus ride to A Woman's Place, a worker-owned feminist bookstore in Oakland, California, by its cofounder Forest Milne. She began volunteering and eventually working there, making her an early member of the bookstore's worker collective. She and Paula Wallace, a colleague at A Woman's Place and her romantic partner at the time, eventually applied for a loan from the San Francisco Feminist Federal Credit Union to start their own bookstore.

== Old Wives Tales ==
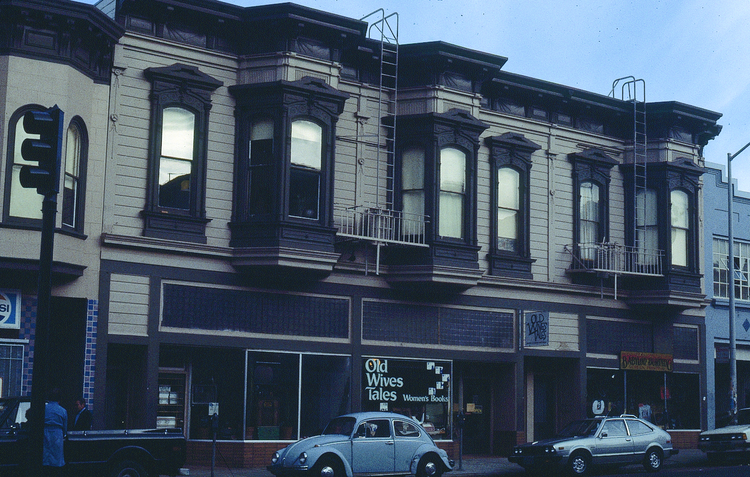
Old Wives Tales bookstore on 1009 Valencia Street in 1983

While attending the First National Women in Print Conference in Nebraska, Seajay received a call from Paula Wallace telling her that the loan had been approved. On October 31, 1976, Seajay and Wallace opened the bookstore on 532 Valencia Street in the Mission Dolores neighborhood of San Francisco, naming it "Old Wives Tales".

Old Wives Tales was a feminist bookstore which often featured books from small publishers, and served as a community space for women in the area.

The bookstore was moved to 1009 Valencia Street after Seajay and Wallace broke up in 1978 and Wallace moved away. Previously a partnership between the two cofounders, it was restructured by Seajay as a worker-owned collective in the new location. Members of the collective incorporated the bookstore as a nonprofit in 1983, the same year Seajay resigned.

Old Wives Tales shut down permanently in October 1995.

== Feminist Bookstore News ==
After returning to the Bay Area from the First National Women in Print Conference, Seajay founded Feminist Bookstore News to help those who met at the conference remain in touch. The five largest feminist bookstores donated $100 each ($566 in 2025) to help start the publication. She published the first issue on October 14, 1976.

By 1983, Seajay had stopped working in bookstores, focusing more heavily on publication of FBN. Beginning in the early 1980s, she also drove a FedEx truck part-time as a source of income.

In 1990, Seajay won the Publisher's Service category at the 2nd Lambda Literary Awards, held at the Las Vegas Convention Center by the Lambda Book Report.

Seajay continued to edit and publish Feminist Bookstore News until summer 2000, when the final issue was published. Over time it became an important trade publication for feminist publishers, printers, and booksellers.

== Books to Watch Out For ==
In 2003, Seajay began publishing an online newsletter called Books to Watch Out For, with a lesbian-focused edition edited by her and an edition for gay men edited by Richard Labonté.
