= Elyse Cherry =

American community development financial institution executive

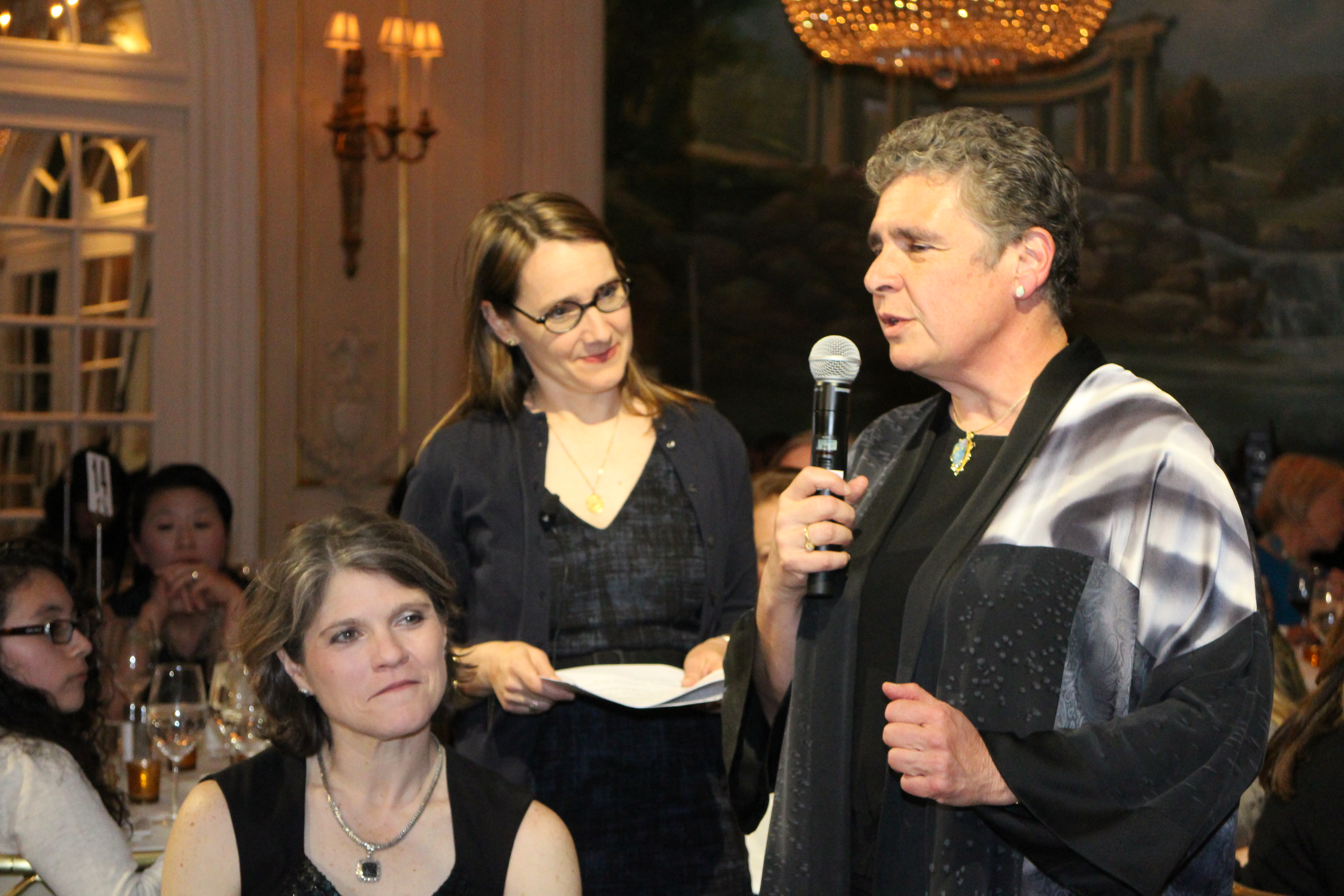
- Cherry (right) in 2014
- Born: 1954 (age 71–72)
- Education: Wellesley College; Northeastern University School of Law
- Employer: BlueHub Capital

Elyse Cherry (born 1954) is the chief executive of BlueHub Capital, a community development financial institution. She is known for her work in community development, affordable housing, and LGBTQ activism.

== Career ==
Cherry began her career as a VISTA volunteer in Tennessee. She spent the next several years as a field examiner in the New England region of the National Labor Relations Board.

After earning a J.D. from Northeastern University School of Law, she joined the law firm of Hale and Dorr (now WilmerHale). For eight years, she focused on commercial real-estate finance and development, for which she was named a partner.

In 1992, Cherry joined the Plymouth Rock family of insurance companies, where she served as a vice president and counsel of SRB, an investment-management subsidiary of Plymouth Rock Assurance.

In 1997, she became the CEO of BlueHub Capital, which she co-founded in 1984.

== BlueHub Capital ==
Under Cherry's tenure, BlueHub Capital (formerly Boston Community Capital) has invested more than $2 billion in low-income communities.

Of note is BlueHub's foreclosure-prevention program, SUN, which Ben Bernanke, then the chairman of the Federal Reserve, cited as “innovative.”

== Boards of directors ==
Cherry is a member of the Wellesley College Board of Trustees, the Board of Advisors of Eastern Bank, Chair of the Board of the Forsyth Institute, and the Board of Directors of The Boston Foundation.

Cherry is a former or present member of several privately held company boards, including include Zipcar, Pilgrim Insurance, Acelero Learning, Selectech, and WegoWise,.

For government agencies, Cherry was the Chair of the Massachusetts Cultural Council and the Foreclosure Impacts Task Force, to which she was appointed by Massachusetts Governor Deval Patrick.

She previously served on the boards of the nonprofits Opportunity Finance Network, the Center for New Words, and the Alliance for Business Leadership.

== LGBTQ activism ==
Cherry is a prominent LGBTQ activist. She has served on the boards of directors and advisory boards of various groups, including GLBTQ Legal Advocates & Defenders (GLAD), MassEquality during the organization's successful campaign to legalize same-sex marriage in Massachusetts, the political action committee LPAC, and the Boston Foundation’s Equality Fund. She also co-chaired GLAD’s capital campaign, One Justice Fund, which raised $1.7 million.

== Education ==
Cherry is a 1975 graduate of Wellesley College, where she studied political science and from which she received the 2017 Alumnae Achievement Award. She is also a 1983 graduate of Northeastern University School of Law, where she delivered the student commencement address.

== Awards ==
Cherry has received many awards throughout her career.

In 2010, Boston (magazine) named her as one of its 35 Gay Power Players.

In 2014, the Obama White House named her a Solar Champion of Change.

In 2014 and 2015, the Financial Times named her one of the Top 100 OUTstanding LGBTQ Executives in the world.

In 2014, the Boston Business Journal named her to its list of the 50 most influential Bostonians.

In 2014, Fenway Health gave her the Dr. Susan M. Love Award, which celebrates a woman and/or organization that has made a significant contribution to the field of women’s health.

In 2021, BlueHub Capital, under Cherry's leadership, was named one of the Top 100 Women Led Businesses in Massachusetts by The Boston Globe and The Commonwealth Institute for the eighth consecutive year.

== Media ==
Cherry is a frequent commentator on current events. Her opinion articles have appeared in publications including the New York Times, CNBC, the Los Angeles Times, the Philadelphia Inquirer, and HuffPost. She has also appeared on TV and radio shows such as the PBS NewsHour and Making Money with Charles Payne.
