= Rita Arditti =

Argentine biologist, educator, activist, and writer

- Born: 9 September 1934; Buenos Aires, Argentina
- Died: 25 December 2009 (aged 75); Cambridge, Massachusetts, United States
- Education: Sapienza University of Rome
- Occupations: Biologist, educator, writer
- Spouse: Mario Muchnik
- Partner: Estelle Disch
- Children: 1

Rita Arditti (9 September 1934 – 25 December 2009) was an Argentine biologist, educator, activist, and writer.

She became interested in the history of the Grandmothers of the Plaza de Mayo, research that she published in a book in English in the United States, her country of residence.

She was a co-founder of New Words Bookstore, the Women's Community Cancer Project, and Science for the People.

== Career ==
=== Academic training and teaching ===
Rita Arditti was born in Buenos Aires on 9 September 1934. She attended Barnard College in the United States for one year, in 1952. She moved to Rome in 1955, where she studied biology at Sapienza University, achieving a doctorate in that specialty. In 1965, she began a postdoctoral fellowship at the biochemistry department of Brandeis University, and in 1966 became a research associate at Harvard Medical School.

She dedicated herself to teaching at Boston University, and for the last 30 years of her career at the Union Institute & University, where she worked with doctoral students.

=== Activism ===
She was a longtime activist, co-founding New Words Bookstore in 1974, the Women's Community Cancer Project, and Science for the People. She coedited Test Tube Women: What Future for Motherhood?, a work based on the new technology of reproduction, and Science and Liberation, about politics and science.

=== Human Rights in Argentina ===
Arditti became interested in investigating the events that occurred in Argentina during the Dirty War, under the military junta that ruled the country from 1976 to 1983. She performed research and engaged in political activism.

She focused on the activities of the Grandmothers of the Plaza de Mayo. After reading their 1985 book Botín de Guerra (Spoils of War), she was deeply affected by the disappearance of babies carried out by the Argentine government. She met members of the Grandmothers during their visit to Boston, which further aroused her interest. She made several trips to Argentina, where she visited the organization's offices. She poured this knowledge and experience into the book Searching for Life: The Grandmothers of the Plaza de Mayo and the Disappeared Children of Argentina, published by the University of California Press in 1999, with the Grandmothers' approval. It was the first major work in English about the group, and was one document used to support their nomination for the Nobel Peace Prize in 2001.

== Awards and recognition ==
The Washington Center for Women's Policy presented Arditti with the Jessie Bernard Wise Woman Award in 1994. In 1999, the City of Cambridge conferred its Peace and Justice Award, and the Union Institute & University made her a faculty member emeritus for her 30 years of experience there.

== Personal life ==
=== Childhood ===
Her parents were Jacques Arditti and Rosa Cordovero, who met in Argentina after independently emigrating from Turkey. They married, both professed the Sephardic Jewish religion, and had three daughters – Edith, Rita, and Alicia. Later they brought three children from Turkey, first cousins of the girls.

=== Marriage ===
When she was attending Barnard College, Arditti met Mario Muchnik, an Argentine who was studying at Columbia, and they began an exchange of correspondence. Later they both returned to Argentina, intending to continue their university studies, but the disorder that prevailed in the country's universities at that time made them relocate to Italy. They started doctorate programs at Sapienza University of Rome – Arditti in biology, and Muchnik in physics. They married, and their son Federico was born in 1960. A year later, Arditti completed her doctorate and got a job in a laboratory in Naples, after which they divorced.

In the early 1980s, she began a relationship with her life partner, Estelle Disch.

=== Breast cancer ===
Arditti suffered from metastatic breast cancer for the last 30 years of her life. This led her to participate in various conferences on the subject, to keep a personal diary about the development of her disease, and to co-found the Women's Community Cancer Project.

It eventually caused her death, on 25 December 2009, while she was undergoing a medical procedure in Cambridge.

== Publications ==
- Women as Objects: Science and Sexual Politics. KNOW. 1974. OCLC 320852435.
- Arditti, Rita; Brennan, Pat; Cavrak, Steve, eds. (1980). Science and Liberation. South End Press – via Internet Archive.
- Arditti, Rita; Duelli Klein, Renate; Minden, Shelley, eds. (1984). Test Tube Women: What Future for Motherhood?. Pandora Press. ISBN 0863580300 – via Internet Archive.
- Searching for Life: The Grandmothers of the Plaza de Mayo and the Disappeared Children of Argentina. University of California Press. 19 April 1999. ISBN 9780520921665 – via Google Books.
