= 13th Moon =

Feminist literary magazine founded in 1973

- Founding Editor: Ellen Marie Bissert
- Second Editor: Marilyn Hacker (Volumes VII and VIII)
- Fiction Editors: Judith Fetterley and Hollis Seamon
- Poetry Editors: A collective working with Judith Johnson
- Frequency: Annual
- Publisher: 13th Moon, Inc.
- Founded: 1973
- Country: United States
- Based in: Albany, NY
- Website: http://13thmoon.net/html/13mmag.html
- ISSN: 0094-3320
- OCLC: 1165759346

13th Moon is an American feminist literary magazine founded in 1973 by Ellen Marie Bissert. The magazine showcased short fiction stories, essays, and reviews by women authors.

The publication featured prominent figures such as Adrienne Rich, Eve Merriam, Marge Piercy, Rochelle Owens, and Audre Lorde.

The magazine's website explains their main intentions with the publication:

"Because the surrounding culture has tended to erase women writers from history, our work has needed rediscovery and preservation anew for each generation. Those differences which have characterized women's writing in traditional modes have often been either ignored or erased as defects or failures, rather than understood as distinctive values. At the same time, those of us who believe, with Audre Lorde, that we "cannot dismantle the master's house with the master's tools," are often excluded from or remain peripheral to male-dominated avant-gardes, needing to modify our work to fit those norms. 13th Moon ignores the constricting splits between traditional and avant-garde that mark much 20th and 21st Century literary polemic. We believe that once we place women's work at the center of either traditional or innovative modes of writing, the definitions both of tradition and of innovation must change, the norms and the boundaries shift, and the critical conversation around them be transformed. We welcome writing and art that engages with any of these questions."

13th Moon also became a publishing company under the name "13th Moon, Inc". Some works they published includes:

- Bissert, Ellen Marie. The Immaculate Conception of the Blessed Virgin Dyke. 1977. (Reviewed in Sinister Wisdom)
- Cowell, Pattie. Women poets in pre-Revolutionary America, 1650-1775. 1979.
- Piercy, Marge. Listening to a Speech. 1983.
