= Womanbooks =

Feminist bookstore in Manhattan, New York City

- Image from the Lesbian Herstory Educational Foundation
- Industry: Feminist Bookselling
- Founded: March 1, 1975
- Founder: Eleanor Batchelder, Karyn London, and Fabi Romero-Oak
- Headquarters: 255 West 92nd Street, Manhattan, NY (1975-1976) 201 West 92nd Street, Manhattan, NY (1976-1985), United States

Womanbooks was a feminist bookstore in Manhattan, New York City. It was founded by Eleanor Batchelder, Karyn London, and Fabi Romero-Oak in 1975 and provided a safe space for women to learn and gather until it closed in 1987. Womanbooks was the second feminist bookstore in New York City, and the first to be inclusive of all women.

== History ==
Inspired by the 1973 New Woman’s Survival Catalog and the belief that there should be a feminist bookstore in every neighborhood, Eleanor Batchelder, Karyn London, and Fabi Romero-Oak opened Womanbooks on March 1, 1975. They recognized the influence and contributions of other feminist bookstores in women's studies and decided that Womanbooks would not only emphasize accessibility to resources but also serve as a women’s center.

Following Labyris, which opened around 1972 in Greenwich Village, Womanbooks became the second known feminist bookstore in New York City in 1975. Batchelder, London, and Romero-Oak also wanted to create a space that welcomed women from different backgrounds, and so, Womanbooks became the first inclusive feminist bookstore in New York City.

When the three bookwomen started out in 1975, the bookstore's booklist was small and carried about five feminist records. Eleanor Batchelder once said in an Womannews article, "we really had no idea what we were getting into." They often spent eighteen hours a day at the bookstore to maintain the business. While the bookstore was undeniably successful and influential in the feminist community, the personal, social, and economical stresses of running a business soon took its toll. Karyn London eventually bought out her partners' shares in 1981 and became the sole owner.

"In 1982, Womanbooks received the Susan B. Anthony Award in recognition of grassroot contributions to women's equality." The bookstore was greatly received by the community and garnered massive support from writers, publishers, and customers.

Womanbooks grew over the years and by 1985, the bookstore carried over 6,000 titles. They had "a large selection of magazines, an extensive collection of lesbian novels and literature, works by women of color, rows of women's sports and women's spirituality, a rental library, a children's corner, a wide range of records, jewelry, buttons, posters, cards and calendars all made by, for and about women."

Karyn London put Womanbooks in the market in 1985 until it was acquired by Martita Midence in the summer of that year.

=== Location ===
Womanbooks' first store was located on the Upper West Side of Manhattan, New York City at 255 West 92nd Street. Their first location did not last long because the space was small, hard to find, and customers often got harassed by men hanging around the building. After a year, they relocated into a corner lot at 201 West 92nd Street, only a block away from their previous location. The new store was far larger and more welcoming. They hung a big red banner with their logo outside and made the store more visible.

=== Impacts and contributions ===
Womanbooks has often been referred to as a "women's center disguised as a bookstore."

"It’s not a supermarket of books. It’s a women’s center disguised as a bookstore… It’s a place to meet, chat, connect, find out about resources, find refuge and comfort. It’s a place where the needs of women and children come first and hopefully all women and children feel comfortable"
