= Lisa Ben =

American writer

- Born: Edythe D. Eyde; November 7, 1921; San Francisco, California, U.S.
- Died: December 22, 2015 (aged 94)
- Other names: Lisa Ben, Tigrina
- Occupations: Editor, writer
- Known for: Lesbian rights activist Publisher, Vice Versa magazine Singer-songwriter

Edythe D. Eyde (November 7, 1921 – December 22, 2015) better known by her pen name Lisa Ben, was an American editor, author, active fantasy-fiction fan and fanzine contributor (often using the name Tigrina in these activities), and songwriter. She created the first known lesbian publication in North America, Vice Versa. Ben produced the magazine for a year and distributed it locally in Los Angeles, California, in the late 1940s. She was also active in lesbian bars as a musician in the years following her involvement with Vice Versa. Eyde has been recognized as a pioneer in the LGBT movement and the foremother of the women in print movement during second-wave feminism.

== Early life ==
Eyde was born in San Francisco in 1921 and grew up an only child on an apricot ranch in Fremont Township, California. Her father, Oscar E. Eyde (1888–1968) was a Norwegian-born insurance agent and her mother, the former Olive Elizabeth Colegrove (1888–1953), was a housewife. Her father also served in civilian defense after the bombing of Pearl Harbor.

She studied violin for eight years.

Eyde developed her first crush on another girl when she was in high school, although she did not identify as lesbian until several years later. When her crush broke off the relationship, a devastated Eyde spoke with her mother. Her mother's adverse reaction convinced Eyde not to discuss her personal or romantic life with her parents again. After attending college for two years, Eyde acquiesced to her parents' demands and took a secretarial course in 1942. After three years of saving her money, she defied her parents and moved, first to Palo Alto, and then to Los Angeles in 1945.

== Science fiction fandom ==
She became active in science fiction fandom (where she was often known as "Tigrina", although her real name was no secret) in early 1941, first through contact with Forrest J. Ackerman (with whom she remained friends for decades) and science fiction fanzines, to which she contributed cartoons and letters of comment. She was an early and active member of the Los Angeles Science Fantasy Society (LASFS), of which she would eventually become secretary after her move to Los Angeles. During this period she acquired some notoriety within fandom due to her proclamation of an interest in Satanism, which drew comments from Henry Kuttner and Wilson Tucker, among others.

== Vice Versa and The Ladder ==
Eyde first identified as a lesbian in 1946, when she noticed that many of the other women in her apartment building did not spend time talking about boyfriends and breakups. One of the women asked Eyde if she was gay, and Eyde realized that she was. She began frequenting lesbian bars with her new friends and, while she was never directly caught up in one of the frequent police raids on such bars, was questioned by police on one occasion. Eyde began publishing Vice Versa in 1947 as a way of expanding her social circle. "I was by myself, and I wanted to be able to meet others like me. I couldn't go down the street saying 'I'm looking for lesbian friends'...[Vice Versa] gave me a way of reaching out to other gay gals—a way of getting to know other gals....when I had something to hand out and when I tried to talk girls into writing for my magazine, I no longer had any trouble going up to new people."

While working as a secretary at RKO Studios, her boss advised her that there would not be a lot of work for her to do but he wanted her to look busy, so Eyde typed each issue of the magazine twice through with five carbon copies, making a total of 12 copies of each issue (a technique which had been used for science fiction fanzines, with which she had considerable experience). She initially mailed three copies to friends and distributed the rest by hand, particularly at the If Club, one of Los Angeles' first lesbian bars. Eyde encouraged her readers to pass their copies along to friends rather than throwing them away. Eyde believes that several dozen people read each copy. Although scrupulous about avoiding material that could be considered "dirty" or risqué, she stopped mailing copies after a friend advised her that she could be arrested for sending obscene material through the mail. Publications addressing homosexuality were automatically deemed obscene under the Comstock Act until 1958.

Eyde published nine issues of Vice Versa, from June 1947 through February 1948. She ceased publication after RKO was sold, forcing her to change jobs. Her new assignment left her no free time at work to type the magazine. She had also accomplished her goal of increasing her circle of friends, and she wanted to spend more time enjoying her new lifestyle rather than writing about it. Despite the short run of the magazine, Eyde is credited with "set[ting] the agenda that has dominated lesbian and gay journalism for fifty years [by] introduc[ing] many of the characteristics that would define the myriad publications that would follow". Vice Versa is considered an important precursor to the women in print movement, an effort to write, print, and circulate publications written by and for women and lesbians. Like Eyde, women in print activists pilfered office supplies from their day jobs, compiled amateur publications with minimal time and resources, and distributed them through informal networks of women, particularly lesbians.

In the 1950s, Eyde began writing for The Ladder, the first nationally distributed lesbian magazine. The Ladder was published by early lesbian group the Daughters of Bilitis (DOB), of which she was a member. It was in writing for The Ladder that she began writing under the pseudonym "Lisa Ben", an anagram of "lesbian", when her first choice, "Ima Spinster", was rejected. The Ladder also reprinted material from Vice Versa.

== Music ==
Eyde resumed her earlier interest in music and began writing and performing gay-themed parodies of popular songs at a local gay club called The Flamingo. For example, "I'm Gonna Sit Right Down and Write Myself a Letter" became "I'm gonna sit right down and write my butch a letter". She was inspired to write her songs out of a determination to create gay entertainment that was neither profane nor demeaning to gay people, particularly after being discouraged by the self-deprecating jokes and songs made by performers in gay clubs. The Daughters of Bilitis released a single of Eyde, as "Lisa Ben", as a fundraiser. The record included her own composition, "Cruisin' Down the Boulevard" with a queer version of "Frankie and Johnny" on the flip side. DOB billed Eyde as "the first gay folk singer". Her music has appeared on the soundtracks of several documentary films.

== Later life ==
At age 36, Eyde entered into her first and only long-term relationship. They lived together for three years until her partner lost all of their money gambling. Afterward, she dated casually but was not interested in pursuing another serious relationship. In 1972, Eyde as "Lisa Ben" was honored by ONE, Inc. as "the father [sic] of the homophile movement" for her creation of Vice Versa. She appeared in the 1984 documentary Before Stonewall, discussing her life and work and performing several of her parody songs. Eyde continued to work in a variety of secretarial positions until retiring. Eyde was honored in 1997 as a founder of the Los Angeles LGBT community. In 2010 the National Lesbian and Gay Journalists Association inducted Eyde into its Hall of Fame.

Eyde lived in Burbank, California. Although her real name is known, Eyde preferred to be known under her pseudonym, saying that she feared being discovered by people who would "not understand". Eyde died on December 22, 2015, at the age of 94. At the time, her death went unnoticed and no obituaries were published.

== Legacy ==
Despite the short run of her magazine Vice Versa, Eyde is credited with "set[ting] the agenda that has dominated lesbian and gay journalism for fifty years [by] introduc[ing] many of the characteristics that would define the myriad publications that would follow". While few copies of her magazine survive, a complete set can be found at the ONE National Gay & Lesbian Archives in Los Angeles. Due to her work with Vice Versa, Eyde has been called the foremother of the women in print movement, an effort by second-wave feminists to establish alternative, autonomous communications networks created by and for women.

The ONE National Gay & Lesbian Archives acquired Eyde’s personal collection of papers and photographs in 2015.

Season 1, episode 3 of the podcast Making Gay History is about her, and a bonus episode of that podcast features her songs.

The National Lesbian and Gay Journalists Association Lisa Ben Award for Achievement in Features Coverage is "designed to honor a journalist whose body of work is distinguished by insight and impact through engaging features on LGBTQ individuals, the LGBTQ community or LGBTQ issues."
