= Vice Versa (magazine) =

American lesbian magazine (1947–1948)

- Third issue, August 1947
- Categories: Periodical
- Frequency: Monthly
- Circulation: 6/month
- Publisher: Edith Eyde (Lisa Ben)
- Founder: Edith Eyde
- First issue: June 1947
- Final issue Number: February 1948; 9
- Country: United States
- Based in: Los Angeles, California
- Language: English
- OCLC: 1624255

Vice Versa (1947–1948), subtitled "America's Gayest Magazine", is the earliest known periodical published especially for lesbians in the United States. Its mission was to express lesbian emotion within the bounds of good taste.

== History ==
Vice Versa was the project of Edythe Eyde, who used the pen name Lisa Ben (an anagram of "lesbian"). Ben was a secretary at RKO Studios in Los Angeles. By her own account, she had "a lot of time to herself" at work and, starting in June 1947, "twice each month typed out five carbons and one original of Vice Versa (a technique she had picked up as a member of science fiction fandom). She recalled being told by her boss that he didn't care what she was typing, but he wanted her to "look busy" so people at the studio would think he was important. She described the intention of the magazine being to create "a medium through which we may express our thoughts, our emotions, our opinions – as long as material was 'within the bounds of good taste'".

The nine issues of Vice Versa created by Lisa Ben "combined a unique editorial mix and a highly personal style" and opened up a forum for lesbians to communicate with each other via readers' letters, personal essays, short fiction and poetry. The first issue was 15 pages long; subsequent issues ranged from 9 to 20 pages.

In Unspeakable, his history of the gay and lesbian press in the United States, journalist and historian Rodger Streitmatter noted that Vice Versa "contained no bylines, no photographs, no advertisements, no masthead and neither the name or address of its editor... yet it set the agenda that has defined lesbian and gay journalism for 50 years." As examples of the 'defining qualities' of the magazine, Jim Kepner, founder and curator of the International Gay and Lesbian Archives cites Vice Versa's mix of editorials, short stories, poetry, book and film reviews and a letters column as setting "the pattern that hundreds [of gay and lesbian magazines] have followed".

The publication was free and Ben initially mailed three copies to friends and distributed the rest by hand, encouraging her readers to pass their copies along to friends rather than throwing them away. Ben believed several dozen people read each copy. Although scrupulous about avoiding material that could be considered "dirty" or risqué, she stopped mailing copies after a friend advised her that she could be arrested for sending "obscene" material through the mail. Publications addressing homosexuality were automatically deemed "obscene" under the Comstock Act until 1958. Ben eventually left her job at RKO and publication of the magazine ceased in 1948.

The editor expressed the hope that "perhaps Vice Versa might be the forerunner of better magazines dedicated to the third sex, which, in some future time, might take their rightful place on the newsstands beside other publications, to be available openly and without restriction." Vice Versa is considered an important precursor to the women in print movement during second-wave feminism. Women's liberationists and lesbians during this period used many of the same methods Ben pioneered with Vice Versa, including establishing amateur publications run by volunteers, pilfering office supplies, and distributing through informal social networks.

== See also ==
- Die BIF – Blätter Idealer Frauenfreundschaften - worlds' first "all-lesbian" periodical, 1926
- Die Freundin - worlds' first lesbian periodical, though published and partially edited and written by men, 1924
- Lesbian literature
- List of lesbian periodicals
- Society for Human Rights, publisher of Friendship and Freedom, the earliest known gay publication in the United States (although no copies are known to survive)
