= A Woman's Place (bookstore) =

Feminist bookstore in Oakland, California

Coordinates: 37°50′12.8″N 122°15′03.9″W

- Information Center Incorporate: A Woman's Place
- Formation: 1970
- Defunct: 1989
- Headquarters: 5251 Broadway

A Woman's Place (fully ICI, Information Center Incorporate: A Woman's Place) was a feminist bookstore in Oakland, California. Opened in 1970, it was one of the first two feminist bookstores in the United States.

== History ==
A Woman's Place was founded in 1970 by a collective of eight women who had previously been selling feminist publications on the street. One of the founders, Alice Malloy, was a member of the collective that published It Ain't Me, Babe, one of the first feminist newspapers. Both It Ain't Me, Babe and a Woman's Place were associated with the burgeoning women in print movement, an effort by second-wave feminists to create autonomous feminist communications networks by establishing women-operated publications, presses, and bookstores.

An outgrowth of the Bay Area Gay Women's Liberation, A Woman's Place was one of the first two feminist bookstores in the United States. Intended as a community space for women, it stocked nonfiction books by men, but only sold fiction and poetry if it was written by a woman. Members of the collective also focused on providing books from the perspective of the Third World and the working class. The Women's Press Collective moved there shortly after the store opened.

The founders of Old Wives Tales, a feminist bookstore in San Francisco, were former members of the collective at A Woman's Place.

In 1982, the bookstore stocked 10,000 different books.

In 1982, a disagreement within the collective involving racism as well as lesbianism versus feminism with acceptance of male allies culminated in two or three older and white members locking out the others from the bookstore, leading to arbitration. The four members who were locked out (Darlene Pagano, Elizabeth Summers, Jesse Meredith, and Keiko Kubo) described themselves as "one Italian, one Jewish, one Black, one Asian". The store later reopened under new management, and in 1983 an arbitration agreement was reached in 1983 that involved the incorporation of the bookstore.

A Woman's Place closed in 1989. Its archives are held by the GLBT Historical Society in San Francisco.
