= Jed Mattes =

American literary agent and LGBT advocate (1952–2003)

- Born: Joseph Edward Mattes; August 3, 1952; Dubuque, Iowa
- Died: July 24, 2003 (aged 50)
- Awards: Publishing Triangle Leadership Award (2003)

Joseph Edward "Jed" Mattes (1952–2003) was an American literary agent and advocate for LGBT rights.

== Early life ==
Mattes was born August 3, 1952, in Dubuque, Iowa, and grew up in Des Moines, Iowa. He had two sisters, Emily and Kate.

Mattes attended the University of Iowa.

== Career ==
Mattes began his career working as a literary agent with International Creative Management, during which time he worked with notable authors including Dr. Seuss and Armistead Maupin.

During his career, Mattes advocated for gay and lesbian literature, and he helped promote LGBT authors.In 1989, Mattes established the literary agency Jed Mattes, Inc. (JMI), through which he handled publishing rights for books, television, and film. With JMI, he represented notable LGBT activists, including Vito Russo, Greg Louganis, Urvashi Vaid, Michelangelo Signorile, Betty Berzon, Gabriel Rotello, and Eric Marcus.

Beyond his work promoting LGBT literature, Mattes served as a civic leader for LGBT rights. He volunteered with the New York City–based non-profit AIDS service organization GMHC, founded the Paul Rapoport Foundation, and served as the president of the Hetrick-Martin Institute, an American non-profit organization devoted to serving the needs of LGBTQ youth between the ages of 13 and 24, and their families.

In 1997, Mattes received a Lambda Liberty Award.

In 2003, he received the Publishing Triangle Leadership Award

== Personal life ==
Mattes moved to New York City in 1970. His sister Kate is the owner of the literary imprint Kate's Mystery Books.

Mattes died on July 24, 2003, at the age of 50, after living with pancreatic cancer for over five years.
