= A Woman's Place (film) =

- Directed by: Rayka Zehtabchi
- Production companies: Digitas; Ventureland; Vox Creative
- Release date: 2019 (Athena Film Festival)
- Running time: 29 minutes
- Country: United States
- Language: English

A Woman's Place is a documentary film by Rayka Zehtabchi. The 29 minute film, commissioned by KitchenAid, was produced by Digitas, Ventureland, and Vox Creative.

The movie follows three female chefs including, Karyn Tomlinson of Minneapolis, and explores the challenges they face in a male-dominated profession.

The film also spurred a partnership with the James Beard Foundation (JBF) to form a mentorship program advancing women in culinary arts.

A Woman's Place premiered on August 24, 2020, on Hulu.

It won the People’s Choice Award at the 2021 Kendal Mountain Festival.
