= Women in Print Conference =

Former meeting of American feminist publishers and booksellers

- Frequency: Irregular
- Country: United States
- Years active: 1976, 1981, 1985
- Established: 1976; 50 years ago

The Women in Print Conference (also the National Women in Print Conference) was a conference in the United States for the women in print movement during second-wave feminism. Founded by June Arnold of Daughters, Inc., the conference brought together women working at feminist periodicals, feminist presses, and feminist bookstores for networking and workshops. The national conference was held three times, in 1976, 1981, and 1985, supplemented by regional conferences.

== National conferences ==
During the book tour for her 1975 novel Sister Gin, June Arnold visited many feminist bookstores and was inspired to create a collaborative network of feminist writers, publishers, printers, and booksellers. The first Women in Print Conference was organized by Arnold in collaboration with Charlotte Bunch and Coletta Reid, both members of the former Furies Collective. The goal of the women in print movement was to establish alternative, autonomous communications networks created by and for women. As a result, the Women in Print conference was influenced by feminist separatism, and the conference was limited to organizations which did not have men working in any part of their operations, though an exception was made for "Third World women working with men on Third World projects." Participants were also discouraged from mentioning the conference to people outside the women in print movement.

The 1976 conference was held at a Camp Fire Girls campsite in Omaha, Nebraska. Omaha was selected because it was centrally located in the continental United States. The event began on August 29 and lasted until September 5. 132 women attended the conference, representing 80 feminist organizations and collectives. One of the conference's major goals was to promote self-sufficiency and skill development for women in publishing. Some attendees hosted a workshop demonstrating how to make paper out of grass due to concerns that paper might become a scarce resource in the future.

The conference inspired feminist bookstore worker Carol Seajay to create Feminist Bookstore News, which became the definitive trade publication in the feminist book trade. Other attendees included influential figures in lesbian and feminist circles, including Dorothy Allison, Harriet Desmoines, Judy Grahn, Barbara Grier, Bertha Harris, Donna McBride, and Catherine Nicholson.

The second Women in Print Conference was held in Washington, D.C., in 1981, and it ran from October 1 through October 4. At the conference, Barbara Smith announced the formation of Kitchen Table: Women of Color Press. While the first conference had included only white women, this one included about 25 women of color, who thus comprised approximately 10% of the more than 250 attendees. The conference schedule included nearly 60 workshops.

The third Women in Print Conference was held in San Francisco, California, in 1985, running from May 29 to June 1. It was scheduled to take place immediately after a nearby American Booksellers Association conference. About 200 women attended and discussed topics including censorship, working class issues, and lesbian erotica.

== Regional conferences ==
Regional conferences included the Midwest Regional Women in Print Conference, which was held for the first time in Woodstock, Illinois from September 10 to September 12, 1982. The Midwest conference convened again in Madison, Wisconsin from June 15 to June 17, 1984. The 1984 conference was organized by A Room of One's Own Bookstore, The Feminist Connection, a feminist periodical, and the office of the women's studies librarian at the University of Wisconsin-Madison.
