= Mission Dolores, San Francisco =

Mission Dolores
- Neighborhood of San Francisco
- Location within Central San Francisco
- Coordinates: 37.76424°N 122.42366°W

Government
  - Supervisor: Rafael Mandelman
  - Assemblymember: Matt Haney (D)
  - State senator: Scott Wiener (D)
  - U. S. rep.: Lateefah Simon (D)

Area
  - Total: 0.72 km^{2} (0.279 sq mi)
  - Land: 0.72 km^{2} (0.279 sq mi)

Population (2016)
  - Total: 10,744
  - Density: 14,900/km^{2} (38,500/sq mi)
- ZIP Code: 94114
- Area codes: 415/628

Mission Dolores is the oldest neighborhood in San Francisco and therefore its birthplace. It is named after the Spanish Mission Dolores settlement of 1776, and is a sub-area of the much larger Mission District.
