= Amazon Bookstore Cooperative =

Feminist bookstore in Minneapolis, Minnesota, United States

Coordinates: 44°55′0.75″N 93°15′45.01″W

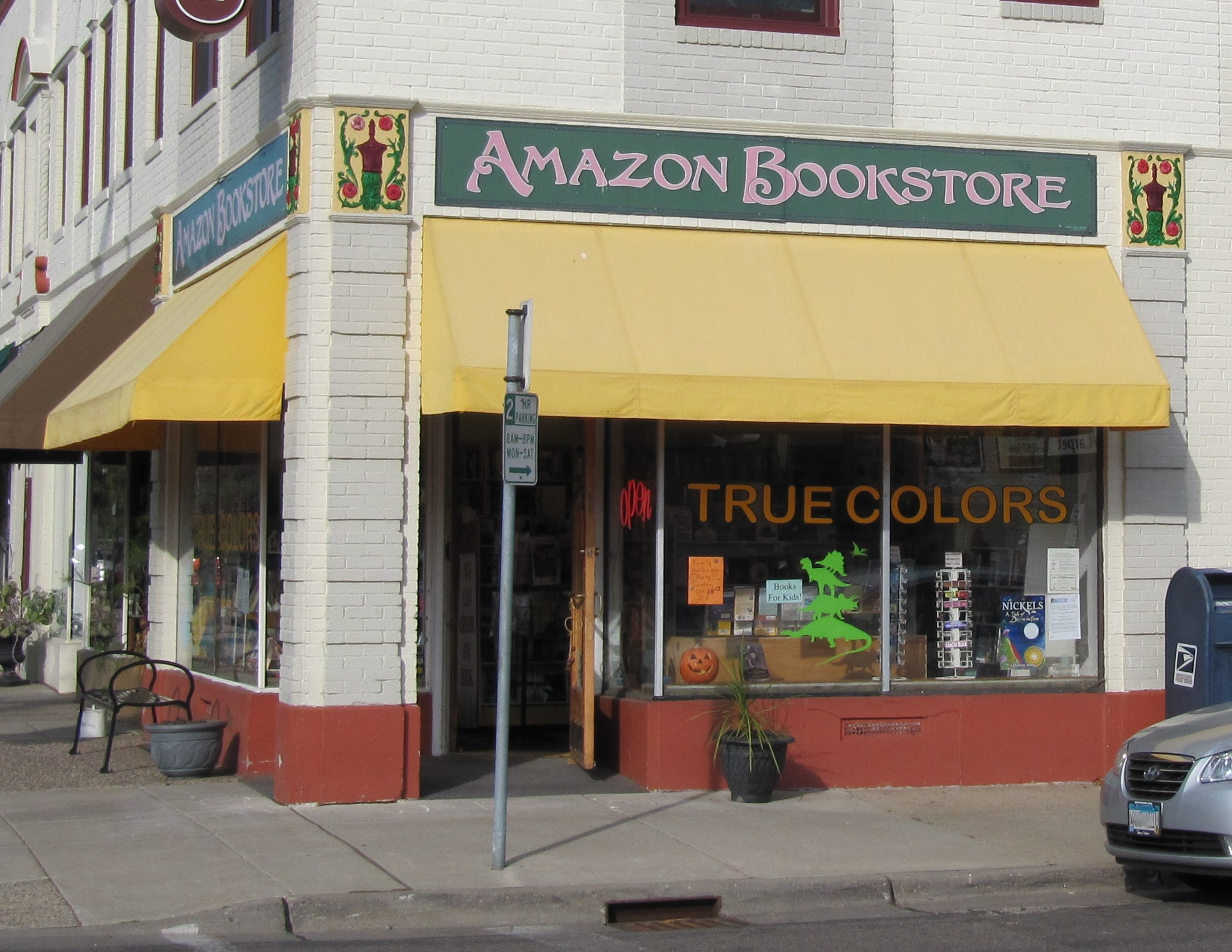
- The store in 2011 with "True Colors" on the window and "Amazon Bookstore" above it
- Type: Worker cooperative
- Industry: Bookselling
- Founded: 1970
- Founder: Rosina Richter Christy; Julie Morse Quist
- Defunct: 2012
- Area served: Minneapolis, Minnesota
- Website: truecolorsbookstore.com

Amazon Bookstore Cooperative was a feminist bookstore located in Minneapolis, Minnesota, that operated from 1970 to 2012. It was the only lesbian/feminist bookstore in the U.S.at some point, but certainly not at its beginning. The shop was named after the Amazons, a mythological tribe of fierce and independent women. In 1994 Amazon.com was founded and within a year, problems started for Amazon Bookstore. Terms of a lawsuit by Amazon bookstore resulted in a settlement, and a requirement that Amazon Bookstore go by the name 'Amazon Bookstore Collective' to reduce confusion with Amazon.com.

== Early years ==
Amazon Bookstore was founded in 1970 by Rosina Richter Christy and Julie Morse Quist. It was associated with the women in print movement, an effort by second-wave feminists to establish autonomous communications networks of feminist publications, presses, and bookstores created by and for women. Like many early feminist bookstores, Amazon began as a small operation with modest resources. The books were kept in the front room of the collective they lived in and books were only available from 3 to 6 PM or by special arrangement. This arrangement lasted for about two years before the book store moved to Minneapolis' Lesbian Resource Center and then migrated through a series of different storefront addresses. Working conditions were sometimes difficult and included an unsafe neighborhood and a building with no heat where pipes froze and people had to wear gloves inside the store.

== Lawsuit ==
In 1999, the cooperative sued Amazon.com for trademark infringement. After sometimes acrimonious legal proceedings, the case was settled in November of that year, with Amazon Bookstore assigning its common law rights in the Amazon name to Amazon.com; and Amazon.com giving a license back to Amazon Bookstore Cooperative for use of the Amazon name.

== True Colors ==
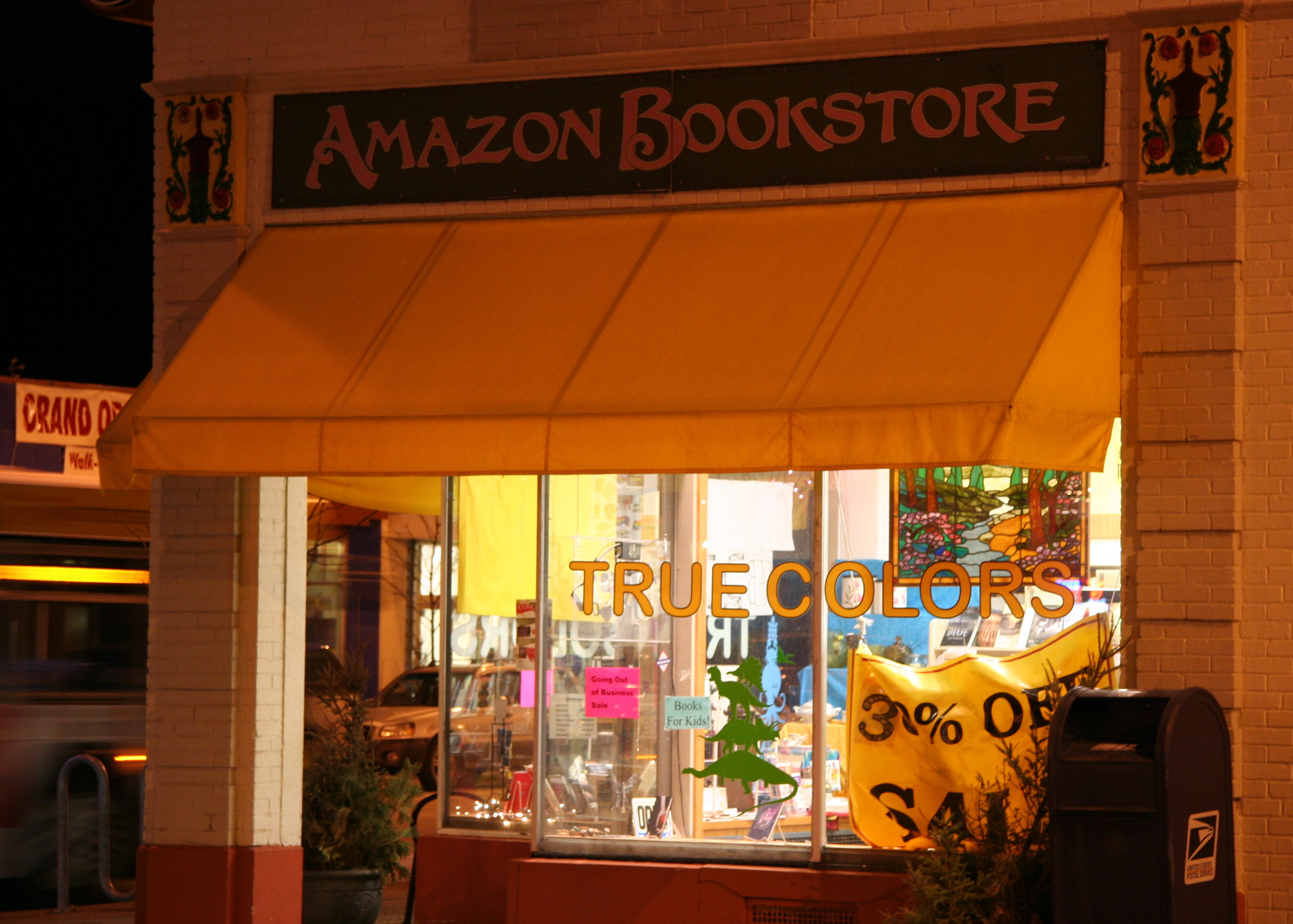
The store in 2012 with a "going out of business" sign in the window.

The business announced that they were closing down at the end of June 2008, and buyers came forth to carry on the store as an independent bookstore. Ruta Skujins, with the help of her partner, Joann Bell, decided to take over the store. Transfer of the ownership of the store happened at the end of June, according to an e-mail sent by the store to customers on June 17.

In November 2008 it was announced that the store changed ownership and as a result, the Amazon name could not be used by the new owner as it was owned by Amazon.com. The new owner of the bookstore, Ruta Skujins, changed the name of the store to True Colors Bookstore, and both names were in use during the transition period. The bookstore began experiencing financial difficulties in late 2011, with the store closing in February 2012 due to this.

== Influence and legacy ==
Like many feminist bookstores, Amazon had an important role in fostering feminist and lesbian communities. Women went to feminist bookstores to meet each other, access books that were impossible to find elsewhere, and host events. It became "the oldest independent feminist bookstore in North America" and was probably "the oldest in the English speaking world". It had an impact locally, nationally, and internationally.

Amazon also had a presence in popular culture. Cartoonist and graphic novelist Alison Bechdel was inspired to create the fictional Madwimmin Books in Dykes to Watch Out For based on experiences at the store.

Amazon Bookstore Cooperative's records are held by the University of Minnesota archives.
