= It Ain't Me, Babe (newspaper) =

Cover page of the fourth issue of It Ain't Me Babe, dated March 15, 1970.

It Ain't Me, Babe was a newspaper published in 1970 by Berkeley Women's Liberation, a feminist organization. The paper has been called "the first feminist newspaper," although that distinction may only be accurate within second-wave feminism in the United States. The newspaper debuted with an issue dated January 15, 1970. It published at least 15 issues, but was in operation for less than a year.

One of the newspaper's founders was Laura X, and Trina Robbins was one of those who worked on it.

The newspaper advocated a decentralized feminism movement: "We must keep in mind that we are a movement not an organization. Our movement can and will be composed of many action organizations differentiated by their political orientation — rather than a single organization that attempts to represent everyone's politics." It called for global solidarity among women, critiqued male-dominated culture, opposed US wars in southeast Asia, advocated women's self defense, and published a first-person account of rape.
