= Feminist bookstore =

Bookshops that sell material relating to women's issues, gender, and sexuality

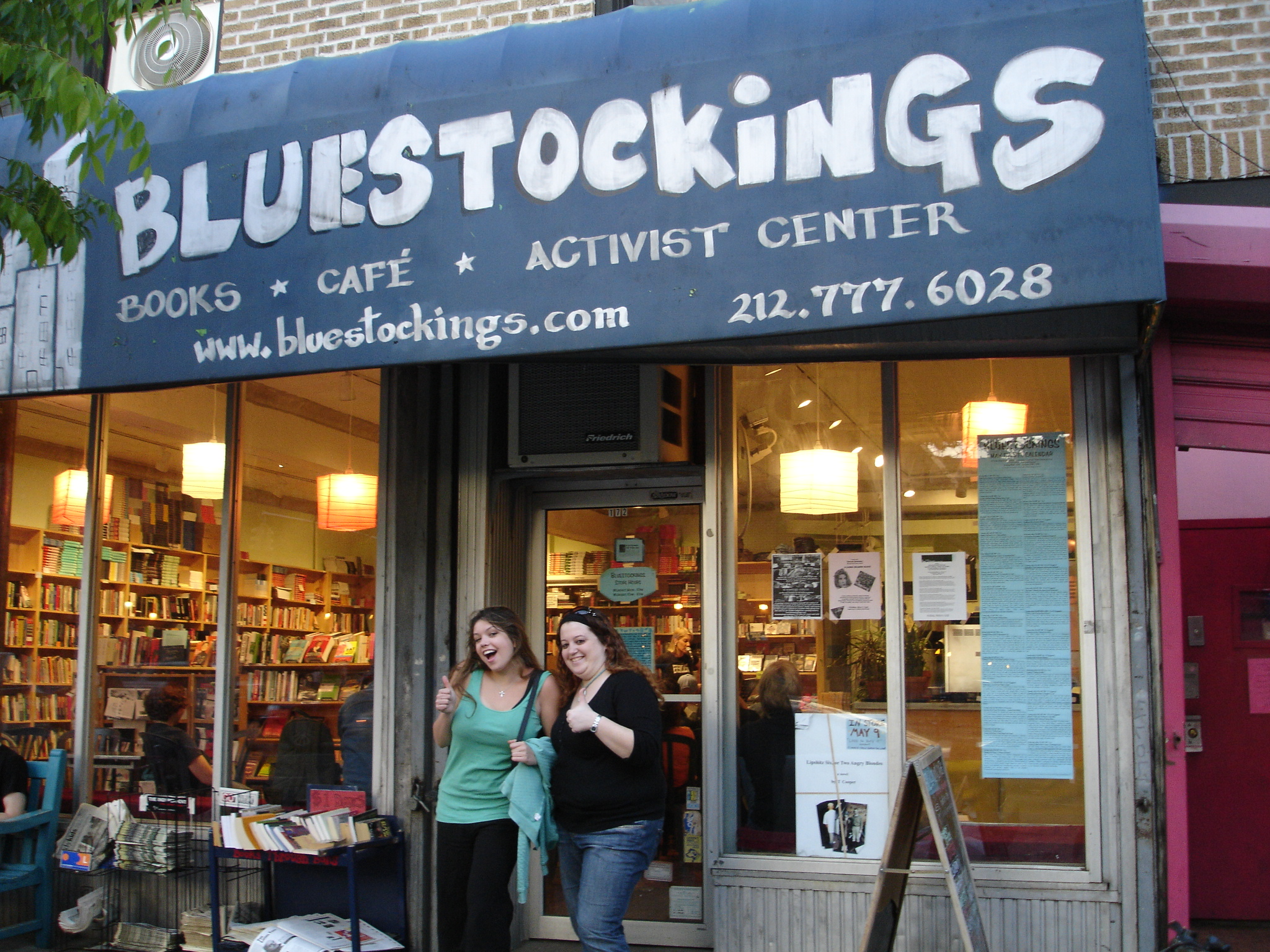
Bluestockings, Lower East Side, New York, 2006

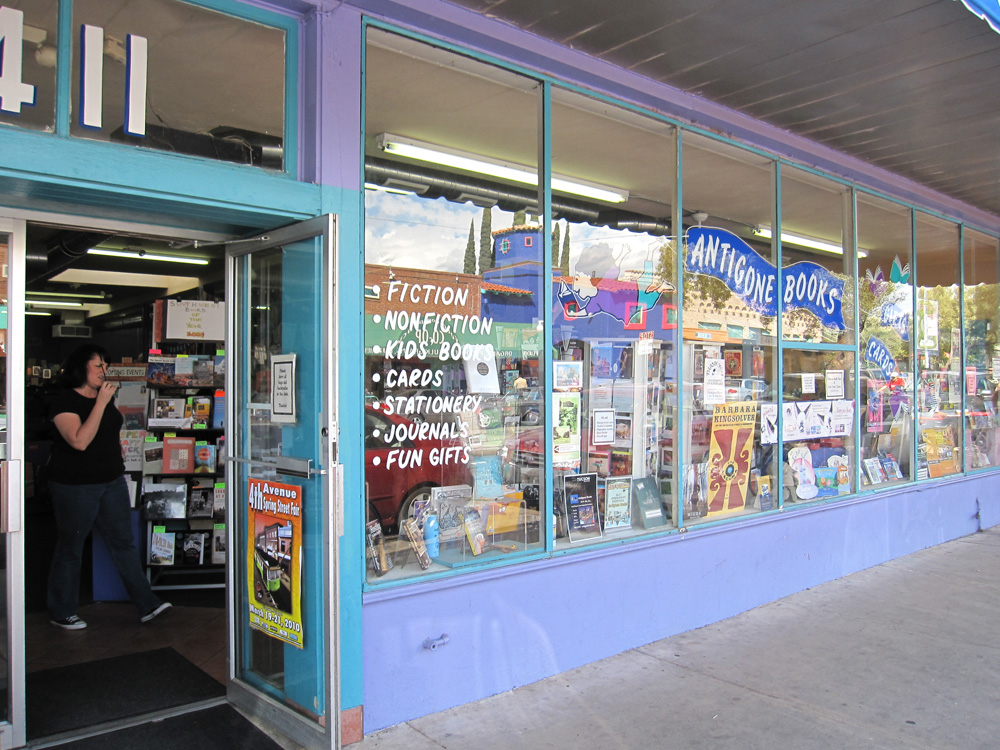
Antigone Books in Tucson, Arizona

Feminist bookstores sell material relating to women's issues, gender, and sexuality. These stores served as some of the earliest open spaces for feminist community building and organizing.

Prior to the spread of feminist bookstores, bookselling was a trade dominated by white men in the United States. There was a lack of awareness and interest within this bookstore leadership to meet the demands for woman-centered literature being raised by feminists at the time. Though some bookstores featured small sections of women's literature or feminist books, these were limited and did not provide the range and depth representative of this category, treating topics not centered around men as an extra section of bookshops rather than an integral part.

== History ==
Many feminist bookstores were established in the mid-twentieth century during the women's liberation movement of second-wave feminism, when feminist separatism and lesbian feminism were growing in popularity. Beginning in 1968 and lasting into the 1980s, the international women in print movement aimed to create autonomous, alternative communications networks created by and for women. Feminists involved with the movement established hundreds of feminist periodicals, presses, and bookstores as part of this effort. After attending the 1976 Women in Print Conference, Carol Seajay of Old Wives Tales founded Feminist Bookstore News, which became the definitive trade publication for feminist bookstores.

Feminist bookstores provided community spaces where women could meet, find feminist publications and educational resources, share their writings, and host events. In the United States, feminist bookstores included New Words Bookstore in Cambridge, Massachusetts, Old Wives Tales in San Francisco (founded by Carol Seajay), Amazon Bookstore Cooperative in Minneapolis, and A Woman's Place in Oakland, California. In the United Kingdom, feminist bookstores included Sisterwrite and Silver Moon Bookshop in London.

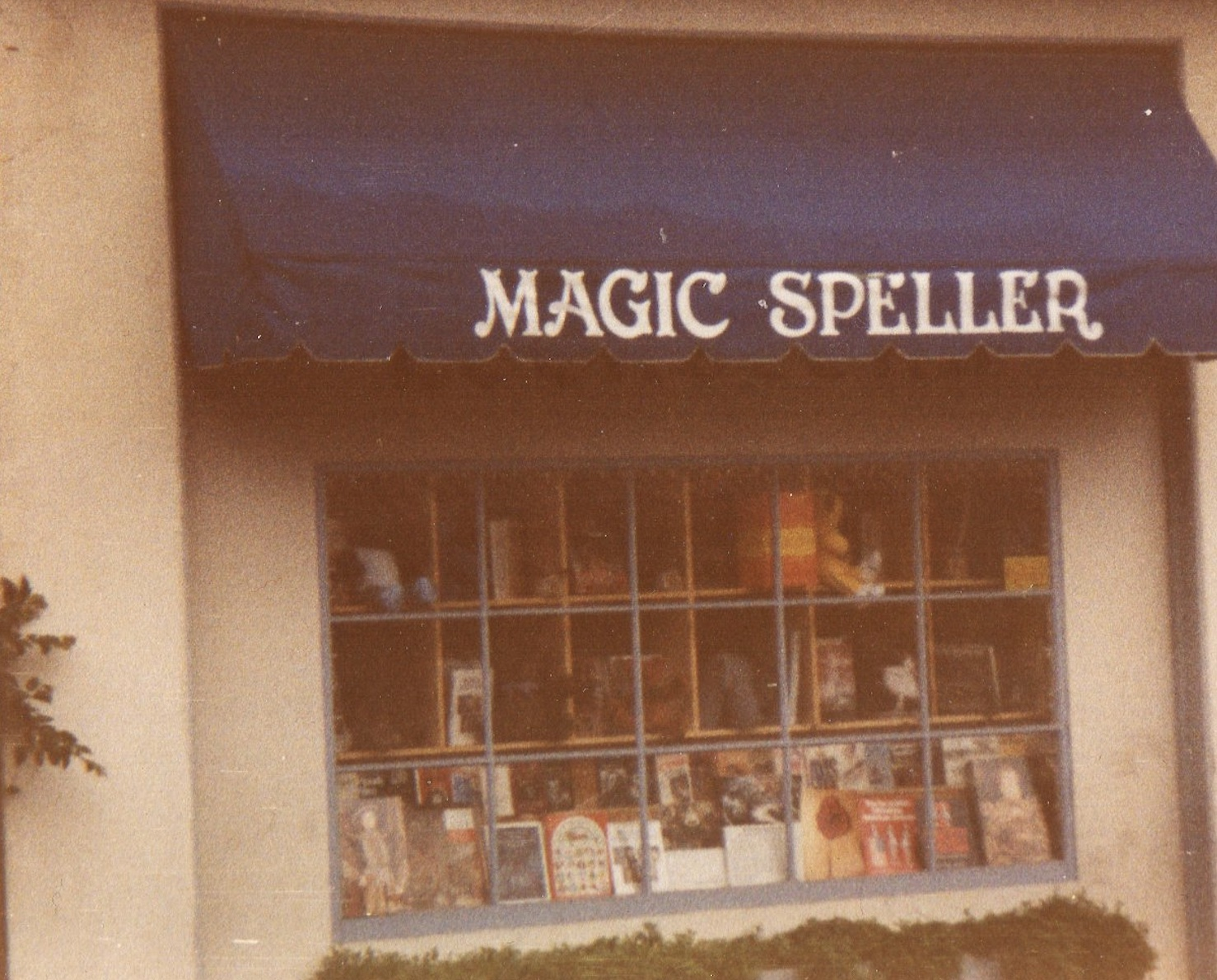
Magic Speller Bookstore

The call for more diverse types of feminist and lesbian spaces took place in-part because queer businesses and locations for community building were few and far between, with the notable exception of the gay bar scene. Even within explicitly LGBT (lesbian, gay, bisexual, transgender) spaces lesbians were ostracized, in addition to the broader societal discrimination which they faced. Feminist bookstores such as Magic Speller Bookstore, which was run by Zoe Nicholson from California, were created in part to combat this homophobia and lesbophobia, in response to the lack of safe spaces for lesbians and bisexual women.

Many feminist bookstores were run as collectives, with non-hierarchical decision making and a reliance on volunteer labor. This was in line with the anti-capitalist tendencies of the women's liberation movement. However, it was difficult to sustain anti-capitalist enterprises in a capitalist marketplace where feminists had to pay rent, buy books, and staff the shops. The recessions of the 1980s made it difficult for feminist bookstores to survive. Some, like New Words in Cambridge, became non-profits so they qualified for grant funding. Despite these efforts, feminist bookstores continued to close in the 1990s and 2000s. In 2001, there were only 74 left in the United States.

== Establishment of Gender and Women's Studies ==
Feminist bookstores were essential to the establishment and growth of feminist studies in the academy. By consolidating feminist literature and providing spaces for open discussion of issues relating to women, these bookshops became incubators for feminist intellectuals. Critical race and gender theories were produced in part by these intellectuals and activists, and feminist bookstores were key to developing the content necessary for the field to be established in the academy. Because these bookstores were open to the public and provided resources through the products sold as well as the women who ran the shops, people who had never had access to that knowledge before then had access. This enabled a more widespread call, first for women's studies and then for gender studies, as academic departments across the nation.

== Issues and responses ==
Though many bookstores were intentional about creating a board of owners that was diverse so as to represent diverse experiences of being a woman, white feminism was a present issue within some leadership. In the case of A Woman's Place bookstore, an alleged lack of understanding of intersectionality was suggested as a cause of the eventual deterioration of the cooperative board and a high-profile legal debate.

One way women of color dealt with this environment was to open businesses run by and centered on their own experiences and made to raise up experiences of other women of color. Kitchen Table Press is one such example; this was a publishing company that produced literature exclusively written by women of color from all backgrounds and then sold to the public, often through feminist bookstores.

== See also ==
- List of independent bookstores
- Feminist businesses
- Feminist literature
