= Hurricane Alice (journal) =

Hurricane Alice: A Feminist Review was a feminist journal edited by a volunteer group of academics, graduate students, university staff, and community members from 1983 to 1998. From its first issue in the spring of 1983 through the end of 1995, it was housed in the Department of English at the University of Minnesota, Twin Cities. The journal moved to Rhode Island College in 1996, where it continued publication until 1998. An outgrowth of second-wave feminism, Hurricane Alice sought to address local, regional, and national audiences by publishing a variety of feminist perspectives on matters of social, political, and cultural concern. It included original essays, reviews, interviews, and creative writing by established and emerging writers, such as Jewelle Gomez, Susan Griffin, Alice Walker, and Nellie Wong, as well as original graphics by area artists. The editors were committed to a feminist understanding that all oppressions are connected and that coalitions across divides of race, class, sexuality, and geography are the path to liberation. That commitment led to the journal's consistent attention to those interconnections, including publishing the work of Black, Indigenous, and other scholars and writers of color as well as that of lesbian and working-class women of all races.

== Background ==
Hurricane Alice grew out of an after-theater discussion among Shirley Garner, Martha Roth, Madelon Sprengnether, and Regina (Jeanne) Strauchon of a play about the life of Willa Cather. This performance, titled Willa, was developed by playwright Marisha Chamberlain in collaboration with members of Illusion Theater, which mounted the stage production.

The four friends, all of whom went on to serve as original editors of the journal, mused about how a conversation such as theirs might find its way into print. They discussed The New York Review of Books and the Women's Review of Books as models for the kind of venue they imagined, concluding that they wanted to address a wider range of issues, to feature more genres (e.g. fiction and art work), and to utilize a cheaper format than did either model. At the end of the evening, they resolved to create a journal of their own. The Hurricane Alice Foundation was established as a 501c3 on 23 July 1984 and dissolved in 1998, after the journal relocated to Rhode Island. Funding for the journal was provided by a combination of subscriptions, donations, benefit readings, and grants for special issues.

== Name ==
In the course of their initial conversation, Shirley Garner said she had long dreamed of such a journal and proposed the name Hurricane Alice as an allusion to the National Weather Service's mid-20th century policy of naming hurricanes after women. In an interview with University of Minnesota History Professor Clarke Chambers, she explained, "I thought of it as turning things upside down, turning a habit of naming bad things after women into something good, and I thought of Alice because Geoffrey Chaucer's name for the Wife of Bath is Alice." Madelon added her association to Lewis Carroll's Alice in Wonderland. Jeanne offered her understanding of hurricanes as starting from a depression or low pressure area. Although hurricanes are destructive, Jeanne explained, they could also be viewed as a creative force as the new replaced what had been destroyed or broken, which was perfectly in line with what the friends hoped to do as they explored women's issues.

== Logo ==
Jeanne Strauchon solicited the logo for Hurricane Alice from graphic designer Gail Swanlund. This image appeared on the cover of each issue. Jeanne's statement describing its origin (paraphrased in "Name," above) was repeated on the masthead page from the journal's inauguration to its conclusion.

Logo for Hurricane Alice, a feminist journal. Designed by Gail Swanlund.

== Editorial staff ==
From 1983 through 2001, a total of eighty-two women—students, faculty members, and community members from both Minneapolis and Providence—served on the editorial staff of Hurricane Alice. Named here are the founding editors and the first group of Rhode Island editors.

=== Founding editors ===
- Martha Roth, executive editor
- Shirley Nelson Garner
- Christine Mack Gordon
- Mollie Hoben
- Toni A. H. McNaron
- Maureen T. Reddy
- Judy Remington
- Madelon Sprengnether
- Regina (Jeanne) Strauchon Sugnet

=== Rhode Island editors ===
- Maureen T. Reddy, executive editor
- Meg Carroll
- Joan Dagle
- Julie Lima
- Carol Maloney
- Marjorie Roemer
- Pauline Santos
- Desiree Schuler
- Carol Shelton
- Cynthia Stanton

== Other notable contributors ==
- Ellen Bass, American poet
- Marion Dane Bauer, American children's author
- Martha Boesing, American theater director, playwright
- Beth Brant, Mohawk writer, essayist, poet
- Evalina Chao, American violinist, memoirist and novelist
- Pearl Cleage, African-American playwright, essayist, novelist, poet, political activist
- Chitra Divakaruni, Indian-American author, poet and writing professor
- Heid Erdrich, Ojibwe writer and editor of poetry, short stories, and nonfiction
- Jane Gallop, American Professor
- Patricia Hampl, American memoirist, writer, lecturer, and educator
- Endesha Ida Mae Holland, American scholar, playwright, and civil rights activist
- Marie Myung-Ok Lee, Korean-American author and essayist
- Meridel Le Seuer, American writer associated with the proletarian literature movement
- Lyn Lifshin, American poet and teacher
- Barbara Macdonald, American social worker, lesbian feminist and ageism activist
- Catharine A. MacKinnon, American radical feminist legal scholar, activist, and author
- Alison McGhee, American author of children's books and adult novels
- Margaret Randall, American-born writer, photographer, activist and academic
- Cheri Register, American author and teacher
- Canyon Sam, author, performance artist, and Tibetan rights activist
- Dorrit Willumsen, Danish writer

== Special issues ==
Selected Special Issues
Year	Volume & Issue	Theme
1984	1.3	Women and Work
1985	3.1	Ancestors, (M)others, and Others
1986/1987	4.2	Images of Women
1987	4.3	Reimagining Gender for Children's Literature
1987	4.4	Women and Film
1988	5.1	Women and Money
1988	5.2	Women and Violence
1988	5.4	Women and War
1988	5.3	A Celebration of Meridel Le Sueur
1989	6.1	Growing Up and Growing Old
1989	6.2	Adorning Our Bodies
1989	6.3	Visions and Transformations: Feminist Possibilities
1989	6.4	Reflecting on Our Sexualities
1991	7.3	Women at Play
1992	8.4	Women World Wide: Our Current Conditions
1992	9.1 & 9.2	Misogynies
1993	9.4	Common Politics
1993	10.1	Women in Land and Landscape
1994	10.2	Native Women Writers
1994	10.3	Danger and Nature—Feminism for a Small Planet

== Mother Journeys ==
Mother Journeys: Feminists Write about Mothering (Minneapolis: Spinsters Ink, 1994) grew out of a special issue of Hurricane Alice titled "Reimagining Gender for Children's Literature," vol. 4, no. 3, guest edited by Amy Sheldon. Sheldon's lead piece, "Bedtime Stories," prompted her to propose a collection of essays about feminist mothering, a topic largely absent from feminist literature and theory. Maureen Reddy and Martha Roth, both founding editors of Hurricane Alice, joined her as co-editors of this volume.

In addition to essays by Hurricane Alice editors Shirley Nelson Garner, Maureen T. Reddy, Judy Remington, Martha Roth, Amy Sheldon, and Madelon Sprengnether, Mother Journeys includes contributions by Linda P. Aaker, Judith Arcana, Martha Boesing, Sheila Fay Braithwaite, Sarah Bruckner, Judith Lerner Crawley, Rita Dove, Jewelle Gomez, Marilyn Hacker, Kimiko Hahn, Molly Hite, Linda Hogan, Akasha (Gloria T.) Hull, Linnea Johnson, Maxine Kumin, Molly Collins Layton, Jane Lazarre, Sherry Lee, Genny Lim, Kathryn S. March, Lynda Marin, Diane McPherson, Greta Hofmann Nemiroff, Sharon Olds, Alicia Ostriker, Minnie Bruce Pratt, Barbara Schapiro, Carolee Schneemann, and Rose Stone. Nicole Hollander, Nancy Spero, and Vera B. Williams contributed cartoons and drawings.

Mother Journeys received the 1995 Minnesota Book Award in nonfiction. It also won the Susan B. Koppelman Award, from the Popular Culture Association/American Culture Association (PCA/ACA) in 1995.

== Publication ceases ==
Hurricane Alice ceased publication after Volume 14 (1998) due to financial difficulties, as the costs of publishing rose and outpaced the editors' ability to raise funds. The Council of Literary Magazines and Presses (CLMP) offered free consulting; the CLMP consultant helped the Rhode Island editors recognize the intractability of the economic bind and to decide to close the journal.

== Archives ==
All fourteen volumes of Hurricane Alice, including links to individual articles, may be accessed at the University of Minnesota Libraries. Hurricane Alice is also available on microfilm in the Gale Family Library at the Minnesota Historical Society.
