= Mab Segrest =

American writer and activist

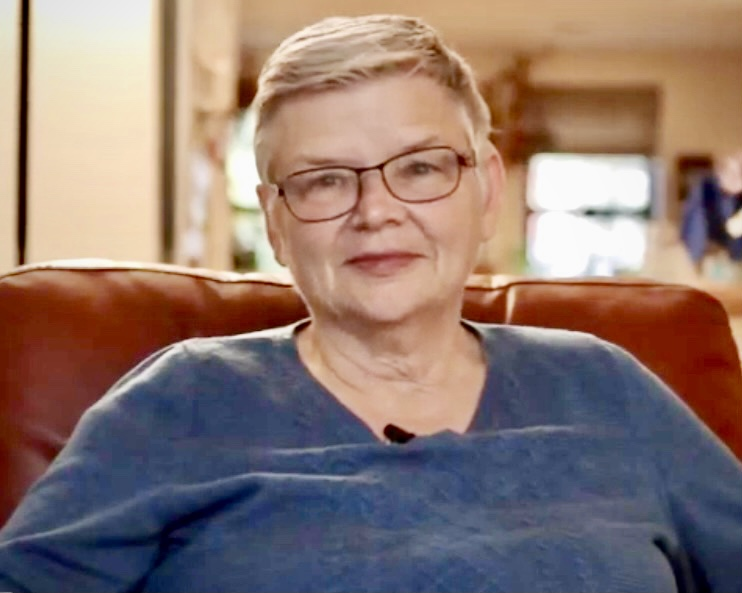
- Segrest in 2016
- Born: Mabelle Massey Segrest; February 20, 1949 (age 77); Tuskegee, Alabama, U.S.
- Education: Duke University (PhD)
- Occupations: Scholar, Writer
- Notable work: Memoir of a Race Traitor

Mabelle Massey Segrest, known as Mab Segrest (born February 20, 1949), is an American lesbian feminist, writer, scholar and activist associated with the American South. Segrest is best known for her 1994 autobiographical work Memoir of a Race Traitor, which won the Editor's Choice Lambda Literary Award. Segrest is the former Fuller-Matthai Professor of Gender and Women's Studies at Connecticut College.

== Career ==
In the 1970s, Segrest moved to North Carolina to attend Duke University, where she earned her PhD in English literature in 1979. While studying at Duke, and for several years thereafter, she taught English at nearby Campbell University. In 2002 Segrest began teaching at Connecticut College in New London, Connecticut, as a Visiting Assistant Professor and Chair of the Gender and Women's Studies Department. In 2004 she was appointed the Fuller-Matthai Professor of Gender and Women's Studies. She was a Mellon Distinguished Professor at the Center for Research on Women at Tulane University in 2004. From 2009 to 2010, Segrest was a Fellow at the James Weldon Johnson Institute for Civil Rights at Emory University. In 2015 she served as the Martha Daniel Newell Scholar in Residence at Georgia College & State University. She retired from teaching in 2014.

== Social activism ==
Segrest has founded, served on the boards of, and consulted with a wide range of social justice organizations throughout her life and is a recognized speaker and writer on issues of sexism, racism, homophobia, classism, and other forms of oppression. In the mid 1980s, Segrest helped to form NCARRV (North Carolinians Against Racist and Religious Violence) with Christina Davis-McCoy. From 1983 to 1990, Segrest worked with NCARRV, for which she is credited by many for ridding North Carolina of the Ku Klux Klan. From 1986 to 1997 she served on the board of the Center for Democratic Renewal, which was founded in 1979 as the National Anti-Klan Network by C.T. Vivian and Anne Braden. From 1992 to 2000 she served as coordinator of the Urban Rural Mission (US), part of the URM network of the World Council of Churches.

== Writing ==
Until it disbanded in 1983, Segrest was a member of the Southern feminist writing collective Feminary, which also produced a journal of the same name. Feminarians, including Segrest, saw writing as a force for political change, and the journal maintained a Southern feminist focus and was anti-sexist, anti-racist, anti-homophobic, and anti-classist.

Through the collective and other activist work, Segrest generated material for her first book of essays, My Mama's Dead Squirrel.

Her book narrating her experience working against the Klan with North Carolinians Against Racist and Religious Violence (NCARRV) is Memoir of a Race Traitor, published by South End Press in 1994. It was named an Outstanding Book on Human Rights in North America and was Editor's Choice for the Lambda Literary Awards. Memoir of a Race Traitor was hailed by Howard Zinn as "extraordinary ... It is a 'political memoir,' but its language is poetic and its tone passionate." It is considered a key text in white studies and anti-racist studies. In this work, Segrest outlines her definition of "queer socialism", which is how she defines her political stance. This version of socialism demands a more caring world where all citizens are taken into consideration when resources are allocated and opportunities are dispensed. She says that while there is no blueprint as yet for this form of socialism, it would be based in feminist theory and practice. It was re-released in 2019 by The New Press.

Segrest's book, Born to Belonging: Writings on Spirit and Justice was published in 2002 and recounts her experiences in activism around the world. Segrest co-edited Sing, Whisper, Shout, Pray: Feminist Strategies for a Just World (2003) with M. Jacqui Alexander, Lisa Albrect and Sharon Day.

Segrest was awarded a fellowship at the National Humanities Center to support the writing of her Administrations of Lunacy: Racism and the Haunting of American Psychiatry at the Milledgeville Asylum on the history of the Central State Hospital in Milledgeville, Georgia. This book was published in 2020 by The New Press.

== In popular culture ==
Founding Riot grrrl band Le Tigre mention Segrest's name in their 1999 single "Hot Topic", from their debut album Le Tigre. In listing important feminist figures, lead singer Kathleen Hanna described the song as "analogous to a college syllabus".

Segrest was portrayed by Staci Jacobson in the 2016 stage play The Integration of Tuskegee High School. The production premiered at Auburn University and dramatized Segrest's time as a student during the 1963–1964 school year in her hometown of Tuskegee, Alabama.

== Publications ==
- Living in a House I Do Not Own (Night Heron Press, 1982)
- My Mama’s Dead Squirrel: Lesbian Essays on Southern Culture (Firebrand Books, 1985)
- Memoir of a Race Traitor (South End Press, 1994; re-released The New Press, 2019)
- Born to Belonging: Writings on Spirit and Justice (Rutgers University Press, 2002)
- Sing, Whisper, Shout, Pray: Feminist Strategies for a Just World (Edgework Books, 2003), M. Jacqui Alexander, Lisa Albrecht, Sharon Day, and Mab Segrest, editors
- Administrations of Lunacy: Racism and the Haunting of American Psychiatry at the Milledgeville Asylum (The New Press, 2020)
