= Mother Journeys =

1994 collection of artistic works

Mother Journeys: Feminists Write about Mothering
- Editor: Maureen T. Reddy; Martha Roth; Amy Sheldon
- Language: English
- Genre: Essay collection
- Publisher: Spinsters Ink
- Publication date: 1994
- ISBN: 1-883523-04-4

Mother Journeys: Feminists Write about Mothering is a collection of essays, poems, cartoons, and drawings edited by Maureen T. Reddy, Martha Roth, and Amy Sheldon and published by Spinsters Ink in 1994. The collection was among the first books to address the topic of mothering from a specifically feminist perspective at a time when many assumed "feminism and mothering were mutually incompatible".

== Background ==
Mother Journeys originated in a special issue of Hurricane Alice: A Feminist Review focused on gender and children's reading. Amy Sheldon, the editor of that issue, conceived the idea for a book about feminism and motherhood, topics which at that time had not often been considered together. Sheldon invited Maureen Reddy and Martha Roth, two editors of Hurricane Alice, to collaborate on the project.

The editors noted that there were "very few books written for mothers by mothers" in print in the early 1990s and conceived of the collection as an opportunity to ask "feminist mothers to tell us what the experience of mothering means to them: how it affects their lives and work, how it relates to their politics, what it is like to mother." In an interview with Nora Lockwood-Tooher, editor Maureen Reddy recalled some of the challenges in putting together a collection of this kind, including the lack of a "clear-cut definition of feminist mothering." Even so, all of the contributors to the collection shared the conviction that they "didn't want to socialize their children into gender roles [that they thought were] restrictive."

Editor Martha Roth added in an interview with Chicago Parent that the collection also sought to challenge the "status quo" of mothering. Roth noted that mothers "are expected to turn out children in order to reproduce, not just biologically, but culturally," adding that, "[a]nyone with a minority viewpoint...is not inclined to be satisfied with the current state of affairs."

== Contents and contributors ==
The collection opens with a prologue cowritten by the three editors and titled "What is 'Feminist Mothering'?" The collection proper is divided into four thematic sections, each one of which is headed by an introduction and includes poetry, visual art, and non-fiction prose. Those sections are Discovering Ourselves, Discoveries Through Our Children, The Politics of Mothering, and Continuity with Our Own Mothers. The collection concludes with an epilogue by the three coeditors that encourages readers to tell their own stories of mothering.

As the prologue notes, feminist thought up to that point (1994) had been "largely the daughter's critique," focusing on mothers mainly as the objects of their children's demands. In seeking to change that discourse, the editors invited a diverse—in race, age, sexuality, social class, ethnicity, life experience—range of writers and artists to contribute their work on the broad topic of feminist mothering. Many of the contributors engaged with topics often considered taboo when combined with motherhood, including abortion, stillbirth, sexuality, desire, war, and erotic bonds. An early reader, Marianne Hirsch, said, "Reading this rich and evocative collection feels like engaging in multiple, impassioned and courageous conversations with feminist mothers." Sara Ruddick, also an early reader, noted that together the contributions offer "a glimpse of what mothering might become when illumined by feminist consciousness."

Apart from the section introductions, prologue, and epilogue, Mother Journeys includes 47 pieces, with some contributors represented more than once. The collection includes three Sylvia cartoons by Nicole Hollander, for example, two prose poems by Kimiko Hahn, several artworks by Nancy Spero, two pieces by Alicia Ostriker, three sonnets by Marilyn Hacker, and three poems by Rita Dove. Some of the contributors were well-established at the time the anthology appeared—including Jewelle Gomez, Marilyn Hacker, and Judith Arcana—while others, such as Sheila Braithwaite, were published for the first time in the collection.

In addition to essays by the editors—Maureen T. Reddy, Martha Roth, and Amy Sheldon--Mother Journeys also includes prose or poetry contributions by Linda P. Aaker, Martha Boesing, Julia Epstein (as Sarah Bruckner), Judith Lermer Crawley, Molly Hite, Linda Hogan, Akasha (Gloria T.) Hull, Linnea Johnson, Maxine Kumin, Molly Collins Layton, Jane Lazarre, Sherry Lee, Genny Lim, Kathryn S. March, Lynda Marín, Diane McPherson, Greta Hofmann Nemiroff, Sharon Olds, Minnie Bruce Pratt, Barbara Schapiro, Carolee Schneemann, and Rose Stone, as well as drawings by Vera B. Williams.

== Themes ==
Reviewers remarked on the breadth of the collection's topics and approaches, with themes including "violence; conflict with majority values, especially as represented by children's schools; sadness at children's inevitable contact with racist, misogynist culture; and pride in self and family for doing things in feminist ways."

Contributors also engage with themes regarding abortion, stillbirth, sexuality, desire, war, erotic bonds, addiction, raising children across the color line, adoption, work, maternal boundaries, and racism.

== Reception ==
Reviewers noted that the collection was an important addition to women's studies collections. Sheila Bender, in a review for UU World Magazine, noted that this "anthology of writings by feminist women—straight and gay, younger and older—fills a gap in feminist literature." Writing for Booklist, Whitney Scott noted that it was an "important addition for women's studies collections" and remarked upon "Sarah Bruckner's [Julia Epstein's] reflections on lesbian mothering...Shirley Nelson Garner's ponderings on her physical person regarded by her children as their property to be fought over fiercely, and Sherry Lee's eloquent discourse on motherhood and poverty," among other pieces.

Although Ellen Ross, writing for the Women's Review of Books, found the collection "a little skimpy on non-white offerings," she said the collection was a welcome addition to books that might offer a new style of mothering that can "function as an antidote to the perfectionist, individualizing, and guilt-inducing vision of motherhood in our culture." Ross added: "Mothers' own stories, mainly confined to gossip or oral history, have been suppressed in our wider culture…To throw out the misogynist mother-child drama, we need vivid, detailed, loud, real mothers on the stage."

The collection was highly praised for the lively and daring quality of its writing; the diversity of tones and styles in the prose, poetry, and artwork; and its unexpected use of humor. Ramona Czer, writing for The Corresponder, described the writing as "lyrical," "wise," and "enthralling" and called the collection a "revealingly honest book." Writing for the MN Women Psychologist Newsletter, Robin King Cooper praised the use of humor in Amy Sheldon's piece on gender and language, "Kings Are Royaler Than Queens," as well as in Nicole Hollander's Sylvia cartoons, which offer readers Hollander's "notably jaded" perspective on the "unforeseen realities of mothering."

Victoria A. Brownworth, writing for The Advocate, called the collection "intellectually stimulating and viscerally affecting," adding that the collection "illuminates motherhood, exploring the areas society wants women to keep hidden. Mother Journeys is for every reader—male, female, straight, gay, child, parent—because, as the editors explain, motherhood is the basis for society. The authors here are exploring a brave new world indeed."

Glenda Martin, co-founder of the Minnesota Women's Press, wrote that "Mother Journeys…was long overdue and [a book] I wish had been there as I was raising my children."

== Awards ==
Mother Journeys won a Minnesota Book Award (1995) and the Koppelman Award for Excellence in Feminist Studies of Popular Culture and American Culture from the Popular Culture Association and American Culture Association (1995). In addition, Maureen Reddy's essay in the collection, "Race-ing Love," on the topic of raising biracial children in America, was nominated in 1995 for a Pushcart Prize, an American literary prize awarded to works published by small presses.
