= Janet Adelman =

American scholar and literary critic (1941–2010)

- Born: Janet Ann Adelman; January 28, 1941; Mount Kisco, New York, U.S.
- Died: April 6, 2010 (aged 69); Berkeley, California, U.S.
- Spouse: Robert Osserman
- Children: 2

Academic background
- Education: Smith College (BA); Yale University (MA, PhD)

Academic work
- Discipline: English
- Sub-discipline: Literary criticism William Shakespeare
- Institutions: University of California, Berkeley

Janet Ann Adelman (January 28, 1941 – April 6, 2010) was an American Shakespeare scholar, literary critic, and professor of English at the University of California, Berkeley.

Adelman's most prominent works include book-length critiques of William Shakespeare’s plays presenting new psychoanalytic and feminist readings of Antony and Cleopatra and The Merchant of Venice in "The Common Liar: An Essay on 'Antony & Cleopatra'" (1973) and Blood Relations: Christian and Jew in 'The Merchant of Venice' (2008), respectively.

Adelman authored another book, Suffocating Mothers: Fantasies of Maternal Origins in Shakespeare's Plays, Hamlet to the Tempest, (1992) that discusses maternal characters over many of Shakespeare's works.

== Early life and education ==
Adelman was born in Mount Kisco, New York, on January 28, 1941. She earned a Bachelor of Arts degree in English and graduated summa cum laude from Smith College in 1962. She then attended St Hugh's College, Oxford in England the following year supported by a Fulbright Fellowship. She received a Master of Arts degree in English from Yale University in 1966 and a Ph.D. in English from Yale three years later in 1969.

== Career ==
Adelman joined the University of California, Berkeley Department of English as an acting assistant professor in 1968 (also one of the first women to join the department faculty), earned tenure in 1972, and became a full professor in 1981. She eventually served as the department's chair from 1999 to 2002 and retired in 2007.

In the early-1970s, Adelman taught a popular "Shakespeare for non-majors" undergraduate course at U.C. Berkeley. Other areas of interest were also listed as: "English Renaissance Literature 1500-1660. Gender & Sexuality Studies. Drama."

Adelman belonged to the Modern Language Association and Shakespeare Association of America. She also was an interdisciplinary member of the San Francisco Psychoanalytic Society and Institute. Adelman was also associated with the Tavistock Institute of Human Relations and the Anna Freud Centre, both in London.

In Berkeley, "Adelman loved the theater and participated actively in the Center for Theater Arts, on whose advisory board she served from 1996 to 1997. After her appointment to a University committee to revamp the theater, dance, and performance studies program, she worked to design a suitable Ph.D. program. She served on both the graduate admissions and faculty appointments committees of what became the Department of Theater, Dance, and Performance Studies, and she became the dissertation director for four Ph.D. students. She served the University in numerous other capacities, among them as a member of the Reading and Composition Task Force from 2006 to 2007, and a participant in the search for a dean of humanities in 2005."

Adelman's other passions included Italian culture. She spent the summers of 1972 and 1973 in Perugia studying Italian language and literature. She received a Rockefeller Foundation fellowship to the Bellagio Study Center in 1998, and a Bogliasco Foundation fellowship to the Liguria Study Center in 2003. For a number of years, she and her husband spent several months annually in an apartment they rented in Rome. She became fluent in Italian, watched Italian movies, and shopped at their local outdoor market.

An active member of the Kehilla Community Synagogue in Piedmont, California, Adelman chaired several committees there. She studied biblical Hebrew at the Graduate Theological Union in Berkeley and was preparing to teach a course at Kehilla on traditional liturgy before she died.

=== "The Common Liar: An Essay on 'Antony and Cleopatra'" ===
In "The Common Liar: An Essay on 'Antony and Cleopatra,'" Adelman provides critical analysis on Shakespeare's tragedy from the roles and persona of the characters to the psychological and mystical matters. The play's historical inaccuracy in terms of timeline and relationship between characters also creates confusion for readers of Shakespeare's plays, and critics find that Adelman's book “is a courageous and stimulating attempt to come to grips with the play's complexities."

Adelman's book addresses three sections of "Antony and Cleopatra": the uncertainty caused by the unreliability of historical information found in the text, the differences of background and tradition – “a tradition which emanates chiefly from Renaissance understanding of Dido and Aeneas, and of Mars and Venus myths” – and the use of poetry and language in the play. Her book ultimately connects the history of Antony and Cleopatra with the events depicted in Shakespeare's play, and investigates how Shakespeare portrays the story, in terms of his use of language and character development.

=== Suffocating Mothers: Fantasies of Maternal Origin in Shakespeare's Plays, 'Hamlet' to 'The Tempest' ===
With her dominant interests in psychoanalysis, gender, and race, Adelman writes Suffocating Mothers, exploring the depiction of females in Shakespeare's works and the dominating effects of the maternal identity over the masculine characters. In short, the focus is on “the nightmare of femaleness that can weaken and contaminate masculinity." In Shakespeare's plays, it is often seen that the maternal body has been seen to contaminate both the father and the son. Adelman's book focuses on a handful of Shakespeare's works: Hamlet, Troilus and Cressida, Othello, All's Well That Ends Well, Measure for Measure, King Lear, Macbeth, Coriolanus, Timon of Athens, and Antony and Cleopatra.

Adelman focuses on either the role of the maternal figure of the play or the lack of one, and the effects on the male characters. Hamlet's view is affected with the role of his mother as the adulterous female, and in Othello, the male imagination is corrupted with the idea of female betrayal. Even in "King Lear", with the absence of a mother in the play, females take on the dominant role over King Lear, the presence threatening “to overwhelm male authority and selfhood." Adelman's Suffocating Mothers goes deeper into her psychoanalysis of Shakespeare's maternal characters, emphasizing the effects of the image of the corrupt mother and female on the male identity and the masculinity of the characters.

=== Blood Relations: Christian and Jew in 'The Merchant of Venice' ===
In a religious reading of Shakespeare's The Merchant of Venice, Adelman focuses on Shakespeare's unique representation of the historical conflict between Christianity and Judaism during the time. Shylock is the principal Jewish character along with his family including Jessica, his daughter, who elopes with Lorenzo and converts to Christianity. Adelman points out the great significance in both Jessica's and Shylock's eventual conversions to Christianity. Adelman analyzes the significance of Jessica's leave and deceit of her father in the context of Jewish cultural history. She approaches the work as she becomes increasingly informed about her religious traditions by attending the Kehilla Community Synagogue in Piedmont, California.

== Personal life ==
Her husband of 33 years, Robert Osserman, said Adelman loved the theater, nature, bird watching and taking walks in Tilden Regional Park.

== Awards and recognitions ==
- Fulbright Fellowship (1962)
- Woodrow Wilson Fellowship (1964)
- Explicator Prize Honorable Mention for "The Common Liar: An Essay on 'Antony and Cleopatra'"
- Fellowship from the American Council of Learned Societies in London (1976–1977)
- Guggenheim Fellowship (1982)
- UC Berkeley Distinguished Teaching Award (1986)
- Charles Mills Gayley Lecturer at UC Berkeley (1990)
- Rockefeller Foundation Fellowship to the Bellagio Study Center (1998)
- Bogliasco Foundation fellowship to the Liguria Study Center (2003)
- UC Berkeley Faculty Award for Outstanding Mentorship of Graduate Student Instructors (2006)
- Berkeley Citation (2007)

== Bibliography ==
The Common Liar - An Essay on Antony and Cleopatra (New Haven: Yale University Press, 1973), 235 pp.

Creation and the Place of the Poet in Paradise Lost, in The Author in His Work: Essays on a Problem in Criticism, ed Louis L. Martz and Aubrey Williams (New Haven: Yale University Press, 1978), pp. 51–69.

Twentieth Century Interpretations of King Lear: A Collection of Critical Essays (Englewood Cliffs, NJ: Prentice Hall, 1978), 134 pp.

'Anger's My Meat: Feeding, Dependency and Aggression in Coriolanus, in Representing Shakespeare - New Psychoanalytic Essays, ed. Murray M. Schwartz and Coppelia Kahn (Baltimore: Johns Hopkins University Press, 1980), pp. 75–91.

Male Bonding in Shakespeare's Comedies, in Shakespeare's Rough Magic : Renaissance Essays in Honor of CL. Barber, ed. Peter Erickson and Coppelia Kahn (Newark: University of Delaware Press, 1985), pp. 73–103.

'This Is and Is Not Cressid': The Characterization of Cressida, in The Mother Tongue: Essays in Feminist Psychoanalytic Interpretation, ed. Shirley Nelson Gamer, Claire Kahane, and Madelon Sprengnether (Ithaca: Cornell University Press, 1985), pp. 119–41.

'Born of Woman': Fantasies of Maternal Power in Macbeth, in Cannibals, Witches, and Divorce: Estranging the Renaissance (Selected Papers from the English Institute, 1985, New Series no. 11), ed Majorie Garber (Baltimore: Johns Hopkins University Press, 1987), pp. 90–121.

Suffocating Mothers: Fantasies of Maternal Origin in Shakespeare, Hamlet to The Tempest (New York: Routledge, 1992), 339 pp.

lago's Alter Ego: Race as Projection in Othello, Shakespeare Quarterly 48 (1997): 125-44.

Making Defect Perfection: Shakespeare and the One-Sex Model, Enacting Gender of the English Renaissance Stage, ed. Viviana Comensoli and Anne Russell (Urbana- University of Illinois Press, 1999), pp. 23–52.

"Her Father's Blood: Race, Conversion, and Nation in The Merchant of Venice," Representations 81 (2003): 4-30.

Blood Relations: Christian and Jew in Merchant of Venice (Chicago: University of Chicago Press, 2008), 226 pp.

== See also ==
- Marjorie Garber
- Stephen Greenblatt
- Literary criticism
