= Joan Drury =

American writer, publisher, and philanthropist (1945–2020)

Joan Drury (2 February 1945 – 9 November 2020) was an American novelist, book publisher, book seller, and philanthropist. She owned Spinsters, Ink, a publishing company that focused on books by women, especially those identifying as lesbian. She was the author of a series of mystery novels featuring a lesbian protagonist, Tyler Jones, and owned and operated a bookshop, Drury Lane Books, in Grand Marais, Minnesota. Drury won several awards for her services to publishing as well as for her own writing, including a Lambda Literary Award. She was also a philanthropist who sponsored writers' retreats, and created the National Lesbian Writer’s Award.

== Biography ==
Drury was born in Minneapolis in 1945, and her family owned a successful garbage-hauling business. Drury grew up in Richfield, Minnesota and worked in her family's business for several years. She married at the age of 18, had three children (Kelly, Kevin and Todd) and divorced in 1978. Drury later went to the University of Minnesota and completed a degree in women's studies. She died of kidney failure in Grand Marais on 9 November 2020.

== Career ==
Drury purchased a book publishing company from Sherry Thomas, 1992, named Spinsters Ink, which published feminist and lesbian writing. The press was initially based in San Francisco, but was moved by Drury first to Minneapolis and later to Duluth, Minnesota. Drury operated the press until 2001, when she sold it to Hovis Publishing in Denver. In 1994, she was given an award from the Lambda Literary Foundation for her contributions to publishing. Spinsters Ink published several well-known authors including Val McDermid (Conferences Are Murder), Maureen Brady (Give Me Your Good Ear), Ellen Frye (Amazon Story Bones), Susan Stinson (Fat Girl Dances with Rocks) and Sandra Butler. An obituary in Publishers Weekly noted that Drury and Spinsters Ink "contributed greatly to feminist publishing and bookselling during a time of great change throughout the industry." Spinsters Ink shut down in 2017, but has since reopened as an imprint of Bella Books. Writer Susan Stinson credits Drury's support as fundamental to her career, citing Drury's selection of her first two books for publication by Spinsters Ink. In 2002, Drury opened a bookstore named Drury Lane Books in Grand Marais.

Drury wrote a trilogy of detective novels featuring a lesbian protagonist named Tyler Jones. Her novel Silent Words won the 1997 Minnesota Book Award and was later reissued by Clover Valley Press in 2009.

Drury was also a philanthropist, and established and sponsored a writer's retreat on Minnesota's North Shore of Lake Superior from 1993 to 2007, which sponsored over six hundred woman to stay and write while it was operative, including Elana Dykewomon. To fund the retreat, Drury created Harmony Women’s Fund, which sponsored over 100 projects relating to women in the state of Minnesota. In 1991, Drury established the National Lesbian Writer’s Award, which was judged by Audre Lorde, Jewelle Gomez, Gloria Anzaldúa, and Sarah Schulman. Winners of the award include Dorothy Allison, Nikky Finney, JP Howard, Lisa Moore, and Achy Obejas.

In an obituary published by Lambda Literary, Julie R. Enszer wrote that "Without women like Joan Drury, women willing to do work, invest resources, engage in capacious and multiple activities, and continue to press on all the while enjoying their labors, we would not have women’s book cultures."
