= Samuel Kobia =

Kenyan Methodist clergyman

- General Secretary, World Council of Churches (2004-2009)

Personal details
- Born: Samuel Kobia; March 20, 1947 (age 79) Miathene, Meru, Kenya
- Denomination: Methodist Church of Kenya
- Spouse: Ruth Kobia
- Children: Kaburo, Nkatha, Mwenda, Mutua
- Occupation: General Secretary, World Council of Churches (2004-2009) General Secretary, National Council of Churches of Kenya (1987-1993)
- Profession: Clergy
- Education: Massachusetts Institute of Technology, McCormick Theological Seminary, St Paul's United Theological College

Samuel Kobia (born March 20, 1947, in Miathene, Meru, Kenya), is a Methodist clergyman and the first African to be elected General Secretary (2004–2009) of the World Council of Churches (WCC), a worldwide fellowship of 349 global, regional and local churches representing a Christian population of over 590 million people. In 2010, Kobia was appointed Ecumenical Special Envoy to Sudan by the All Africa Conference of Churches (AACC). Kobia is married to Ruth, and they have two daughters, Kaburo and Nkatha, and two sons, Mwenda and Mutua.

== Early life ==
Sam Kobia grew up in a rural home in Meru, eastern province of Kenya, where he completed primary and secondary education under the British colonial system. His ecumenical career began with his studies at St. Paul's University, Limuru, Kenya), where he graduated with a diploma in Theology in 1971.

== Study and work abroad ==
Kobia then moved to Chicago and enrolled in the McCormick Theological Seminary to study urban ministry. His interest in urbanization and its impact on African cities lead him to continue further exploration in this field. He applied and was accepted to the prestigious Massachusetts Institute of Technology where he graduated with a Masters in City Planning (MCP) in 1978. His thesis paper for his Master's is titled Origins of squatting and community organization in Nairobi.

In 1978, after graduating from MIT, Kobia and his family moved to Geneva, Switzerland, to take up the post of executive secretary for Urban Rural Mission at the World Council of Churches (WCC). Kobia spent most of his career at the WCC.From 1978 to 1984, he was executive secretary for Urban Mission at the WCC in Geneva, and served as secretary of the WCC Africa task force. He would eventually head the international organization from 2004 to 2009.

In 1993, Kobia earned a Doctor of Divinity (honorary degree) from the Christian Theological Seminary in Indianapolis. In 2000, he spent a sabbatical year as a fellow at the Center for the Study of Values in Public Life at Harvard Divinity School, Harvard University.

== Return to Kenya ==
In 1984, Kobia returned to his home country to serve as Director of Church Development activities at the National Council of Churches of Kenya (NCCK). Three years later, in 1987 he was elected General Secretary of NCCK. He served as General Secretary from 1987 to 1993. Under his leadership, the NCCK was vocal about the need for multi-party politics in Kenya and campaigned against repression during the Moi era.

== Global Leadership ==
From Kenya, he returned to Geneva, Switzerland in 1993 to serve as Executive Director of WCC's Unit III - Justice, Peace and Creation. In 2003 he was elected General Secretary; his election was received with endorsement by global peers. During his acceptance speech he quoted the African proverb "If you want to walk fast, walk alone; but if you want to walk far, walk together". In this spirit, he worked to promote greater unity in the ecumenical movement through collaboration and dialogue.

In 2005, he rejected the accusation of anti-Zionism against the WCC and stated that anti-Semitism is a "sin against God and man" and "absolutely irreconcilable with the profession and practice of the Christian faith," quoting from the first assembly of the WCC in Amsterdam in 1948. He has nevertheless been critical of the Israeli occupation of the Palestinian territories, calling it "a sin against God".

The same year, he paid a tribute to Pope John Paul II on behalf of his efforts for ecumenism.

Kobia served as General Secretary for one term resigning in 2009. Kobia's resignation come as a surprise to the Central Committee, who stated that he had their "full support" despite harsh criticism from Rt. Rev. Martin Hein.

In 2010, Kobia was appointed Ecumenical Special Envoy to Sudan by the All Africa Conference of Churches (AACC). Kobia has deep knowledge of Sudan having worked with the late John Garang in 1990 when the WCC set up peace talks between the mainstream SPLM/SPLA led by John Garang and the SPLM/SPLA United led by Riak Machar. Kobia led the six-month-long talks, which were sponsored by the National Council of Churches of Kenya and the People for Peace of the Catholic Church in Kenya, with technical assistance from Nairobi Peace Initiative-Africa. In this current post, he continues his role as peacemaker and global leader.

== Selected publications ==
Kobia has written numerous papers and articles on Africa, peace and ecumenism. His publications reflects his vision, his working experiences. He is the author of the following books:

- Dialogue Matters: The Role of Ecumenical Diplomacy in the Run-up to the Independence of South Sudan (2013)
- South Sudan: Free at Last (2011)
- Celebrating Life: A Festa da Vida (2007)
- Called to the one hope: a new ecumenical epoch (2006)
- The courage to hope: the roots for a new vision and the calling of the church in Africa (2003)
- Why you should vote (1992)
- The old and the new NGOs: approaches to development (1985)
- The origins of squatting and community organization in Nairobi (1978)
