= Feminary =

U.S. lesbian feminist magazine

Feminary: A Feminist Journal for the South Emphasizing Lesbian Visions
- Feminary, Volume 12, Issue 1
- Language: English
- Edited by: Collective

Publication details
- Former names: Research Triangle Women’s Liberation Newsletter, Female Liberation Newsletter of Chapel Hill, The Feminist Newsletter
- History: 1969–1982
- ISO 4: Find out here

Feminary: A Feminist Journal for the South Emphasizing Lesbian Visions was an American feminist newsletter and magazine that ran from 1969 to 1982. It is considered an example of the women in print movement, and is noted for its focus on lesbian feminism and the United States South.

== History ==
Feminary originated in 1969 as the Research Triangle Women’s Liberation Newsletter, a small pamphlet advertising women's liberation groups in Raleigh, Durham, and Chapel Hill, North Carolina (known collectively as the Research Triangle for their proximity to major research universities). By its third issue, the newsletter would be renamed to the Female Liberation Newsletter of Chapel Hill. The newsletter was founded by and for local feminist and women's groups active in the Research Triangle, including Female Liberation #27, a feminist and socialist offshoot of Students for a Democratic Society, and the feminist Group 22, which later became Lollipop Power, a feminist children's books publisher.

Jennifer L. Gilbert's history of Feminary documents several articles and announcements published during the Newsletter's first year. These included an article by Female Liberation #27 warning of the dangers of byssinosis, a lung disease affecting mostly female textile workers in the state; a call to support a planned sexual discrimination suit against Ligget and Myers, a local tobacco producer; and a call to protest the planned the execution of Marie Hill, a Black woman from nearby Rocky Mount sentenced to death for the accused murder of a shopkeeper. Collective members during this early period included Elizabeth Knowlton, Marguerite Beardsley, and Minnie Bruce Pratt.

The Newsletter's publication frequency began to dwindle by the second half of 1970, and in late 1971, the Newsletter would stop publishing for over a year. A new core of collective members, including Elizabeth Knowlton, Nancy Blood, Linda Brogan, and Leslie Kahn, would restart the newsletter in early 1973, this time renamed to simply the Feminist Newsletter. This new iteration intended to become a bi-weekly publication, and in addition to local announcements, began to publish essays, news, poetry, and classified ads. In 1974, the Newsletter would be renamed to Feminary, a term inspired by Monique Wittig's 1969 novel Les Guérillères.

In an issue published in the spring of 1978, Feminary would make its final name change to Feminary: A Feminist Journal for the South Emphasizing Lesbian Visions. With this name change came an explicit change in scope, which the collective then wrote was a "shift in focus from a local feminist magazine to a lesbian feminist journal for the South." By this time, the collective's membership consisted primarily of Susan Ballinger, Minnie Bruce Pratt, Mab Segrest, and Cris South. Other collective members at different points in the magazine's history included Aida Wakil and Ramina Y. Mays, who later left to found the feminist publication Between Ourselves: A Woman of Color Magazine in Washington D.C., and Sue Sneddon, who often designed covers and graphics for the magazine.

The journal ceased publication in the South in 1982. The remaining collective members had then sought new publishers for Feminary, and ultimately handed the publication over to a group located in San Francisco. While the San Francisco group had ambitions to produce a version of Feminary as a "national magazine with an international perspective," they ultimately only produced two issues from before shuttering permanently in 1985.

Feminary was published from 604 W Chapel Hill Street (left) in Durham

Feminary's transformation into primarily a literary journal meant that it did not always provide timely news and group announcements to the Research Triangle area. To address this need, former Feminary members Nancy Blood and Leslie Kahn, as well as six other women, founded a new newsletter for the Triangle area titled simply The Newsletter. This publication was meant to more closely follow the format of the original Feminist Newsletter, and ran from 1981 to 2001.

== Membership and organization ==
Throughout its history, Feminary was organized collectively, rather than hierarchically. Collective membership changed over time, with different core editorship at different points of its history. Several of collective's longest serving members were also part of Triangle Area Lesbian-Feminists (TALF), a local lesbian-feminist group, and discussions originating in TALF were sometimes reprinted in issues of Feminary.

Feminary had almost no external funding, and sustained itself via individual subscriptions and voluntary labor from collective members. In some cases, members surreptitiously used resources from local universities to print the journal. Some issues were printed by Whole Women Press, a lesbian feminist printer founded by former Feminary members Nancy Blood and Leslie Kahn. At one point, the magazine received a grant of $1,200 from the Coordinating Council of Literary Magazines.

== Legacy ==
Feminary was an exemplar of the women in print movement, and is often compared to fellow Southern lesbian feminist publication Sinister Wisdom. The magazine was particularly noted for its representation of feminism and lesbianism in the South. Throughout its tenure, it published pieces from feminist writers including Anita Cornwell, Maureen Brady, Barbara Smith, as well as an interview with lesbian activist Mabel Hampton by writer Joan Nestle. Although collective members were mostly or sometimes all white women, Feminary is also remembered for taking a relatively strong anti-racist stance among publications in the women's liberation movement and the lesbian feminist movement.

Many members of the Feminary collective continued to engage in public scholarship and activism. Elizabeth Knowlton, who left Feminary when it was still The Feminist Newsletter, later moved to Atlanta and co-founded the Atlanta Lesbian Feminist Alliance. Mab Segrest founded North Carolinians Against Racist and Religious Violence (NCARRV), an anti-racist organizing group, and Southerners On New Ground (SONG), a social justice organization. Segrest continues to write and has published several books, including Memoir of a Race Traitor, which won the 1994 Lambda Literary Editor's Choice Award. Collective member Minnie Bruce Pratt continued to write, teach, and organize until her death in 2023.
