= Nancy K. Bereano =

American publisher

Nancy K. Bereano (born August 17, 1942) is an American editor and publisher. She founded Firebrand Books, an influential lesbian feminist press, in 1984 and ran it until her retirement in 2000.

== Career ==
She worked at the Crossing Press, an independent publisher, where she edited the Feminist Series for five years, publishing such books as Audre Lorde's Sister Outsider, Marilyn Frye's The Politics of Reality, and a reissue of Pat Parker's Movement in Black. In the fall of 1984, Bereano left Crossing Press and started Firebrand Books; by the spring of 1985 she was issuing her first list: Pat Parker's Jonestown and Other Madness, Mohawk Trail by Beth Brant, and Moll Cutpurse, Her True History by Ellen Galford.

In 1988, Bereano published Dorothy Allison's Trash, which won two Lammy or Lambda Literary Awards in the categories of Lesbian Fiction and Small Press. Other notable titles on Firebrand's list include the "Dykes to Watch Out For" series by Alison Bechdel, Stone Butch Blues by Leslie Feinberg, and books by Jewelle Gomez, Minnie Bruce Pratt, and Cheryl Clarke. Firebrand won a total of four American Library Association Gay/Lesbian/Bisexual Book Awards and twelve Lambda Literary Awards. In 1996, Bereano won the Publisher's Service Award from the Lambda Literary Foundation.

In 2000, Bereano sold Firebrand Books to LPC Company, the distributor which had been selling her list for the previous five years. Firebrand's editorial and financial records were donated to the Division of Rare and Manuscript Collections at Cornell University.

In 2007, Bereano received the Michele Karlsberg Leadership Award from the Publishing Triangle.

== Activism ==
Bereano was instrumental in helping to secure the passage of LGBT anti-discrimination legislation for the City of Ithaca and Tompkins County. She is a founding member of the Tompkins County Working Group on LGBT Aging, a grassroots information and advocacy organization located in Ithaca, New York. She currently serves as a community representative on the City of Ithaca’s Workforce Diversity Committee and has been trained as a Talking Circles on Race and Racism facilitator.

== Personal life ==
Bereano was born and raised in The Bronx, New York. Her partner is Elisabeth Nonas, a playwright and an associate professor of Media Arts, Sciences, and Studies at Ithaca College.
