= Lynn Strongin =

American poet (born 1939)

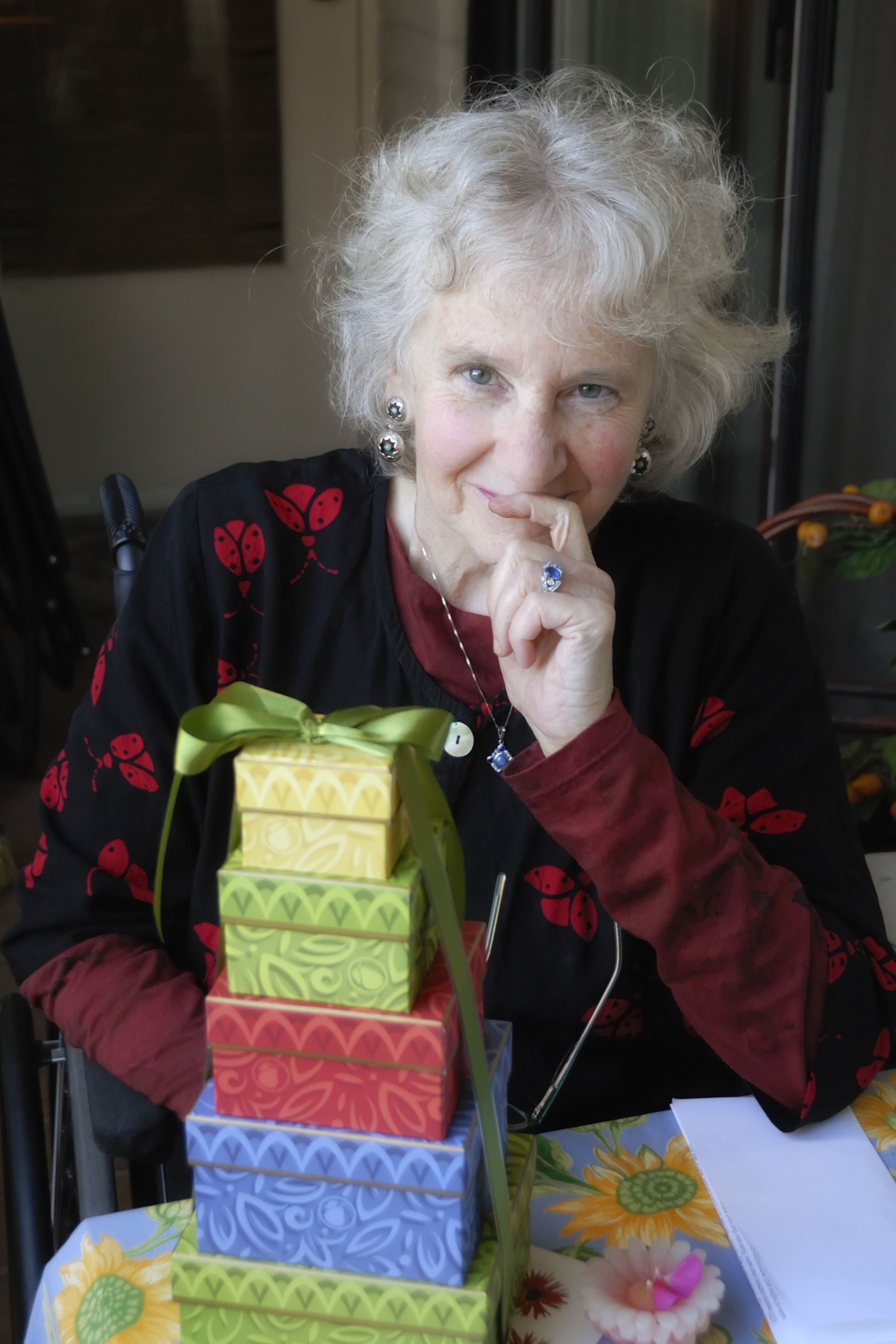
- Lynn Strongin in 2008
- Born: February 27, 1939 (age 87); New York City, New York, U.S.
- Education: BA, Hunter College, MA, Stanford University
- Occupation: Poet
- Writing career
- Genre: Poetry
- Notable awards: National Endowment for the Arts Creative Writing Fellowship

Lynn Strongin (born February 27, 1939) is an American poet currently residing in Canada who has published more than two dozen books. A pioneering writer on issues of feminism and disability, her poetry and other writings have appeared in a large number of literary magazines and influential anthologies including Sisterhood Is Powerful, No More Masks! An Anthology of Poems by Women, and Rising Tides: 20th Century American Women Poets.

== Life ==
Strongin was born in 1939 in New York City to a middle-class Jewish family of Eastern European background. Her father, Edward I. Strongin, was a psychologist and her mother, Marguerite, an artist. During World War 2, her father's work with injured and shell-shocked soldiers led the family to travel across the Eastern and Southern United States. In the South, Strongin's family faced a large amount of discrimination, an experience that worked its way into her later writings. It was during this time that Strongin began writing music on a broken-down piano in her family's home, later branching into poetry because she felt "the need for words rather than notes to express what I saw and felt about me."

Strongin's parents divorced in 1949. Two years later at the age of 12, Strongin contracted polio and spent five years being unable to attend school. She also spent over half a year in a rehabilitation hospital and had to use two crutches and two long leg braces to walk.

When Strongin attended the Manhattan School of Music, she was the only student who'd had polio and used braces and crutches. To avoid being stared at, she would arrive early to class and be the last to leave. Strongin studied musical composition despite being unable to use a piano's foot pedals. She later transferred to Hunter College and also attended Stanford University, where she earned a Master of Arts in literature.

After receiving her masters, Strongin taught at various colleges including Merritt College, Mills College and the University of New Mexico before moving in the 1960s to Berkeley area, where she became politically active and worked for Denise Levertov. During this time she also connected with others in the literary community including Robert Duncan, Kay Boyle, and Josephine Miles. She also became involved in fighting for disability rights and accessibility, joining San Francisco's Committee for the Rights of the Disabled, a self-help and advocacy group.

In 1971, Strongin received a National Endowment for the Arts (NEA) Creative Writing grant. Her first book of poetry, The Dwarf Cycle, was published the following year.

She currently lives in Victoria, British Columbia, Canada. Her younger sister is Martha Strongin Katz, founding violist of The Cleveland Quartet.

== Writing career ==
Stongin has published more than two dozen poetry collections and books, along with editing various magazines and anthologies. Known as a pioneering writer who focuses on themes of feminism, lesbianism, trauma, pain, strength, illness and disability, many of Stongin's writings from the 1960s and '70s were published in influential anthologies such as Sisterhood Is Powerful: An Anthology of Writings from the Women's Liberation Movement, I Hear My Sisters Saying: Poems by Twentieth-Century Women, Rising Tides: 20th Century American Women Poets, 31 New American Poets, No More Masks! An Anthology of Poems by Women, and The American Literary Anthology, 2. During this time she also published a number of poems in various magazines and journals such as Poetry, New York Quarterly and The Ladder, the first nationally distributed lesbian publication in the United States.

In 1980, the publisher Spinsters Ink released a call to readers and bookstores in Feminist Bookstores Newsletter seeking donations to fund the release of the press' next two titles, The Cancer Journals by Audre Lourde and Strongin's first novel Bones & Kim. The call for donations succeeded and both books were published. Bones & Kim ended up being the third book published by Spinsters Ink. The novel focuses on the love between a disabled writer named Kim and a younger woman, Norah, while Kim also deals with her tempestuous mother. Library Journal praised the novel, saying "The entwining of emotion and memory, and the tenderness women share are concerns Strongin explores in sharply etched vignettes."

Strongin has continued to publish in recent decades, with her poetry, reviews and writings appearing in a large number of literary journals including Antigonish Review, Poetry, Poetry Flash, Southern Humanities Review, Shenandoah, and storySouth along with anthologies such as Avant-Garde for the New Millennium, Best of the Web 2009, Blood to Remember: American Poets on the Holocaust, and Visiting Emily: Poems Inspired by the Life and Work of Emily Dickinson.

== Critical response ==
Strongin's poetry has been called both "arduous and gentle" and is noted for the "use of varied line lengths and single-line stanzas" that force people to slow down to read her poems. Library Journal called her poetry collection Countrywoman/Surgeon an "evocation of life perceived beautifully through the senses. The collection was also nominated for the Elliston Award. Library Journal also named her collection Nightmare of Mouse: Poems as one of their best small press titles of 1977.

Denise Levertov described Strongin as a "true poet" while Hugh Fox called her the "most exciting poet writing today." Writing in Poetry Flash, James LeCuyer said that Strongin's poetry "glows with creative leaps of the imagination, a playful wildness and ironic humor ... her poetry and stories dance passionately." A review in Parnassus described Strongin writings as being the "poetry of the emergencies of consciousness in conflict with excrutiating recollections" that still "woos the reader by dint of sheer lyricism and imagination." Bounds Out Of Bounds: A Compass For Recent American and British Poetry said that "Lynn Strongin writes about pain and strength in a striking way" and added that "It may be as disturbing to read Strongin's poems as it is to endure life at certain times. But because they confront and transcend life's bonds so boldly the reader feels a breathtaking sense of clarity and freedom."

Strongin has also been included in Headmistress Press' collection of Lesbian Poet Trading Cards. Hugh Fox's poem "Here I Am" mentions Strongin by name.

== Awards ==
Strongin has received grants and fellowships from the National Endowment for the Arts, the American Association of University Women, and PEN America while her book Spectral Freedom was nominated by her publisher for the Pulitzer Prize in Poetry. She has also been nominated multiple times for the Pushcart Prize and has received a George Woodcock Grant for Writers.

== Bibliography ==
=== Poetry collections ===
- She Decided to Call Her First Child London (Austin Macauley Publishers, 2018)
- Aingeal of the Work House Howl (Cyberwit, 2017)
- Power to the Meek: Songs Of A Child At War (Austin Macauley Publishers, 2017)
- A Bracelet of Honeybees (Headmistress Press, 2016)
- The Burn Poems (Headmistress Press, 2015)
- The Children of the Lime Burners (Cyberwit, 2015)
- Invisible Paradise: Songs & Spirit Dolls (Last Heron Press, 2011)
- Alabama Light & Power Co: The Chalice of Bedlam (Plain View Press, 2011)
- Twin Tan Dogs: Obedience and Discipline (Ravenna Press, 2010)
- Spectral Freedom: Selected Poetry, Prose and Criticism (Casa de Snapdragon Publishing, 2009)
- Secrets You Tell Your Doll (Last Heron Press, 2008)
- Lace-Circled Darkness (Erbacce Press, 2007)
- Countrywoman/Surgeon (L'Epervier Press, 1979)
- Hacksaw Brightness (Ironwood Press, 1977)
- Nightmare of Mouse: Poems (L'Epervier Press, 1977)
- Toccata Of The Disturbed Child (Fallen Angel Press, 1977)
- Paschal Poem: Now in the Green Year's Turning (Sunring Press, 1976)
- Shrift: A Winter Sequence (Thorp Springs Press, 1975)
- The Dwarf Cycle (Thorp Springs Press, 1972)

=== Novels ===
- Bones & Kim (Spinsters Ink, 1980)
- Fabrytius' Chylde (Casa de Snapdragon, 2015)

=== Autobiographies ===
- Albino Peacock (Plain View Press, 2008)
- Obliquities, Old money: A Poet's Memoir, An American Jewish Childhood and Coming of Age (Cyberwit, 2008)

=== Anthologies (as editor) ===
- Crazed by the Sun: Poems of Ecstasy (Cyberwit, 2008)
- The Sorrow Psalms: A Book of Twentieth-Century Elegy (University of Iowa Press, 2006)

=== Recordings ===
- Nocturne (written and directed by Lynn Strongin, broadcast September 11, 1969 on KPFA)
- C.A.T.E. Presents "A Day Of Poets" Reading Their Own Poetry (1970)
