= Spinsters Ink =

- Type: Corporation
- Industry: Publishing
- Founded: 1978
- Founder: Maureen Brady; Judith McDaniel
- Headquarters: Tallahassee, Florida, United States
- Key people: Linda Hill (Publisher); Katherine V. Forrest (Supervising editor)
- Products: Women's fiction books
- Website: spinstersink.com

Spinsters Ink is a lesbian feminist publishing company based in the United States. Founded in 1978 by Maureen Brady and Judith McDaniel, it was later acquired by publisher Linda Hill, who purchased the company in 2005. Hill also owns Bella Books and Beanpole Books.

== History ==
Spinsters Ink was founded by Maureen Brady and Judith McDaniel in Upstate New York in 1978. It moved to San Francisco in 1982, where it was purchased by Sherry Thomas.

In 1980, Spinsters Ink released a call to readers and bookstores in Feminist Bookstores Newsletter seeking donations to fund the release of the press's next two titles: The Cancer Journals by Audre Lorde and Lynn Strongin's first novel Bones & Kim. The call for donations succeeded and both books were published.

The early history of Spinsters Ink is closely tied up with that of another feminist publisher, Aunt Lute Books. Spinsters Ink merged in San Francisco with Aunt Lute Book Company in 1986, to form Spinsters/Aunt Lute. The Aunt Lute Foundation was established as a non profit publishing program in 1990, and the two companies separated again.

In 1992, Spinsters Ink was purchased by lesbian feminist philanthropist Joan Drury and moved to Minneapolis. Drury moved the press to Duluth in 1995. In 2001, Drury sold the company, and Spinsters Ink moved to Denver, Colorado, under Sharon Silvas, who brought back into print the classic feminist utopian novel, The Wanderground by Sally Miller Gearhart.

The press is currently owned by Linda Hill, and employs Katherine V. Forrest as editorial supervisor.

== Titles ==
Spinsters Ink has published many well-known women authors, including Sheila Ortiz-Taylor, Minnie Bruce Pratt, Paula Gunn Allen, Elana Dykewomon, Judy Grahn, Audre Lorde, Gloria Anzaldúa, Val McDermid, and Cherríe Moraga. It received a Publisher Service Award from the Lambda Literary Foundation.

Current writers include Lambda Literary Award winners Julia Watts and Katherine V. Forrest. Sheila Ortiz-Taylor continues to publish with Spinsters Ink. Its current catalog includes general, dramatic and genre fiction for women and lesbians.

=== Notable titles ===
- McDonald, Barbara; Rich, Cynthia (1983). Look Me in the Eye: Old Women, Aging and Ageism. ISBN 9780933216099.
- Andrzejewski, Julie; Thompson, Karen (1988). Why Can't Sharon Kowalski Come Home?., winner of the Editor's Choice special award at the 1st Lambda Literary Awards
- Rosenblum, Barbara; Butler, Sandra (1991). Cancer in Two Voices., winner of the 1992 Lambda Literary Award for Lesbian Nonfiction
- Pincus, Elizabeth (1992). Two-Bit Tango. ISBN 978-0-933216-88-4., winner of the 1993 Lambda Literary Award for Lesbian Mystery
- Mother Journeys. 1994.
- Stinson, Susan (1995). Martha Moody.
- Córdova, Jeanne (November 2011). When We Were Outlaws: A Memoir of Love and Revolution. ISBN 9781935226512.; winner of the 2012 Publishing Triangle Judy Grahn Award for Lesbian Non-fiction
