= Madelon Sprengnether =

Academic, memoirist, and poet

Madelon Sprengnether (born 1942) is a poet, memoirist, literary critic, and Regents Professor Emerita of the University of Minnesota. She is most known for her work on Freud and Shakespeare. Her publications include Great River Road: Memoir and Memory, Near Solstice: Prose Poems, and Mourning Freud.

== Early life and education ==
Sprengnether grew up in St. Louis, MO. As she recounted in her memoirs Rivers, Stories, Houses, Dreams (1983), Crying at the Movies (2001), and Great River Road (2015), "her childhood was disrupted by her father’s death by drowning when she was nine years old and her stepfather’s death by suicide when she was 18."

Sprengnether received her B.A. from Bryn Mawr College. She later matriculated to Yale University where she earned her Ph.D. in English Literature.

== Career ==
After contract teaching at Middlebury College, Sprengnether was hired by the University of Minnesota in 1971 as an assistant professor in English specializing in Shakespeare. While at the University of Minnesota, her interests expanded to include feminist psychoanalytic criticism. She taught courses for the English Department and the Creative Writing Program on Shakespeare, Freud, psychoanalytic theory, feminism, film, memoir, and creative writing for 46 years before retiring in 2017.

Sprengnether was elected as Regents professor in 2008.

=== Feminist Studies in Literature ===
In the early 1980s, and in collaboration with fellow English professors Toni McNaron and Shirley Garner, Sprengnether co-organized the first symposium on Feminist Studies in Literature at the University of Minnesota-Twin Cities. As the keynote speaker, Adrienne Rich delivered a talk, "Toward a More Feminist Criticism," a transcript of which is now available in the Hurricane Alice archive in Anderson Library at UMN-Twin Cities.

Sprengnether was also a member of a group of scholars who helped to establish the first Women's Studies Program (est. 1973) at the University of Minnesota and to introduce feminist studies into the university's English department curriculum. Upon her retirement, Sprengnether's contributions to the national movement to bring feminism to academia--and to UMN-Twin Cities, in particular--were noted by the university's College of Liberal Arts in a retrospective that describes the early years of her career:

The campus, like the nation, was in ferment; feminism had moved from the streets to the courts and the Capitol. Two women welcomed Sprengnether to the Department of English: Assistant Professor Garner and Associate Professor Toni McNaron. Together they would bring feminism firmly into the academy by helping to establish one of the nation’s first women’s studies programs and a feminist graduate program (united now as the Department of Gender, Women, and Sexuality Studies) and by introducing women writers and feminist scholarship into the English curriculum.

For these and other efforts to develop Gender, Women, and Sexuality Studies at University of Minnesota-Twin Cities, Sprengnether, McNaron, and Garner were honored collectively by the College of Liberal Arts through the institution of the Garner-McNaron-Sprengnether Dissertation Fellowship.

=== Creating Writing Program ===
While Director of the Creative Writing Program, Sprengnether was "instrumental in developing the Creative Writing Program" at UMN-Twin Cities. In the early 1990s, the program was classed as an MA in Creative Writing rather than an Masters of Fine Art, which was the "standard in the field." At that time, the program received fewer than 50 applications for admissions per year, students had no funding, and completion time was "as many as six to eight years." Sprengnether "redesigned the curriculum, building an ambitious program of visiting writers, enhanced publicity, contacts with the Twin Cities literary community, full funding for incoming students, and opportunities for students to write reviews," which led to a significant increase in visibility and prestige for the program. The university's College of Liberal Arts noted in a retrospective on her career that

Sprengnether stepped up, first writing the proposal and then guiding it through a lengthy University approval chain, an intensive year-long process. She also helped set up the “architecture” of the program, including hiring additional faculty and staff and securing student funding. In 1996, the first MFA students entered the Creative Writing Program, which is now regularly ranked among the top 10 to 15 MFA programs in the country with more than 350 applications for its 12 annual student openings.

== Research and writings ==
Sprengnether is best known for her work on Freud and Shakespeare. She is a feminist psychoanalytic critic with two collections of criticism, The (M)other Tongue: Essays in Feminist Psychoanalytic Interpretation, and Shakespearean Tragedy and Gender. Her book, The Spectral Mother: Freud, Feminism and Psychoanalysis, analyzed Freud’s avoidance of the figure of the mother in his writing, while offering a new theoretical position regarding the pre-oedipal period. Besides Shakespeare and Freud, she has published widely on contemporary female writers and feminist psychoanalytic theory, as in her co-edited collection, The (M)other Tongue, which brought together essays in feminist psychoanalytic criticism at a time when the field of feminist psychoanalytic criticism was still being established. In 2018 she published Mourning Freud, which analyzes Freud’s experiences and theories of mourning as the basis for exploring changes in psychoanalytic theories and practices over the course of the 20th century.

In 1983, Sprengnether co-founded Hurricane Alice: A Feminist Review (1983-1998), a feminist journal edited by a volunteer group of academics, graduate students, university staff, and community members from 1983 to 1998. The journal was first housed at the University of Minnesota-Twin Cities, where it remained until it moved to Rhode Island College in 1996. An outgrowth of second-wave feminism, Hurricane Alice sought to address local, regional, and national audiences by publishing a variety of feminist perspectives on matters of social, political, and cultural concern. It included original essays, reviews, interviews, and creative writing by established and emerging writers, such as Jewelle Gomez, Susan Griffin, Alice Walker,and Nellie Wong, as well as original graphics by area artists. Mother Journeys: Feminists Write About Mothering, a collection of early essays about feminist mothering, grew out of a collaboration among Maureen T. Reddy, Martha Roth, and Amy Sheldon as a result of their work on Hurricane Alice. To this collection Sprengnether contributed "Jessica's Poems," a series of poems written in collaboration with her four-year-old daughter, Jessica.

== Awards and recognition ==
- Regents Professor, 2008
- Distinguished Women Scholar Award in the Humanities and Social Sciences, 2005
- Award for Outstanding Contributions to Postbaccalaureate, Graduate, and Professional Education, 2004
- Fessler-Lampert Chair in the Humanities, 2001 - 2002
- McKnight Research Award, 1999 - 2002
- College of Liberal Arts Scholars of the College, University of Minnesota, 1992
- National Endowment for the Arts Fellowship, 1988
- The Loft Creative Nonfiction Award, 1987

== Selected publications ==
=== Criticism ===
- Mourning Freud (Bloomsbury, 2018)
- The Spectral Mother: Freud, Feminism and Psychoanalysis (Cornell University Press, 1990)

=== Memoir and Poetry ===
- Great River Road: Memoir and Memory (New Rivers Press, 2015)
- Near Solstice: Prose Poems (Holy Cow! Press, 2015)
- The Angel of Duluth, prose poems (White Pine Press, 2006)
- Crying at the Movies: A Film Memoir (Graywolf Press, 2002)

=== Edited Collections ===
- Shakespearean Tragedy and Gender. Ed. Shirley Garner and Madelon Sprengnether (Indiana University Press, 1996)
- Revising the Word and the World: Essays in Feminist Literary Criticism. Ed. V. Clark, R. Joeres and M. Sprengnether (Chicago University Press, 1993)
- The (M)other Tongue: Essays in Feminist Psychoanalytic Interpretation. Sprengnether, Madelon, Ed. Shirley Garner and Claire Kahane (Cornell University Press, 1985)
