= Tales from the Planet Sylvia =

1990 collection of comic strips

Tales from the Planet Sylvia is a 1990 collection of comic strips by the American cartoonist Nicole Hollander from her syndicated comic strip Sylvia.

The strips are non-continuous with one another, as is usual for Sylvia, and they feature the standard content of Sylvia comics, such as cats, gender politics, and the afterlife. The strips display a pungent sense of humor and a strong touch of feminism, as the title character interacts with her friends, her daughter, and her television set.

Published in 1990 by St. Martin's Press, the book has an introduction by Barbara Ehrenreich.

== See also ==
List of works by Nicole Hollander
