= List of works by Nicole Hollander =

The first collections of Nicole Hollander’s daily comic strip Sylvia were published in the late 1970s and early 1980s by St. Martin's Press. After 1985, except for two anthology volumes, St. Martin's Press was replaced by other publishers as listed below. Collections published in the 1990s and 2000s combine selections from the comic strip with cartoons and text created for the books.

== Sequential collections ==
1. I'm in Training to Be Tall and Blonde, 1979, ISBN 0-312-40165-5.
2. "Ma, Can I Be a Feminist and Still Like Men?": Lyrics from Life, 1980, ISBN 0-312-03611-6.
3. That Woman Must Be on Drugs: A Collection of Sylvia, 1981, ISBN 0-312-79510-6.
4. "Mercy, It's the Revolution and I'm in My Bathrobe": More Sylvia, 1982, ISBN 0-312-53013-7.
5. My Weight Is Always Perfect for My Height—Which Varies: More Sylvia, 1982, ISBN 0-312-55861-9.
6. Hi, This Is Sylvia: I Can't Come to the Phone Right Now, So When You Hear the Beep, Please Hang Up, 1983, ISBN 0-312-37193-4.
7. Sylvia on Sundays, 1983, ISBN 0-312-78185-7.
8. Okay, Thinner Thighs for Everyone, 1984, ISBN 0-312-58316-8.
9. Never Tell Your Mother This Dream, 1985 ISBN 0-312-56480-5.
10. Never Take Your Cat to a Salad Bar: New Sylvia Cartoons, Vintage Books, New York, 1987, ISBN 0-394-75558-8.
11. You Can't Take It with You, So Eat It Now: Everyday Strategies from Sylvia, Vintage Books, New York, 1989, ISBN 0-679-72236-X.
12. Everything Here Is Mine: An Unhelpful Guide to Cat Behavior, Avon Books, New York, 1992 ISBN 0-380-76949-2.
13. Female Problems: An Unhelpful Guide, Dell, New York, 1995, ISBN 0-440-50686-7.
14. My Cat's Not Fat, He's Just Big-Boned , Hysteria, Naperville, 1998, ISBN 1-887-16643-2.
15. Cats with Attitude: Two Volumes in One Collection: Everything Here Is Mine and My Cat's Not Fat, He's Just Big-Boned, Gramercy Books, New York, 2002, ISBN 0-517-21955-7.
16. Psycho Kitties, Sourcebooks Hysteria, Naperville, 2006, ISBN 1-402-20729-8.
17. Nobody Owns a Cat: An Unhelpful Guide to Cat Behavior, Sourcebooks Hysteria, Naperville, 2007, ISBN 1-402-21023-X.

== Anthology collections ==
1. The Whole Enchilada: A Spicy Collection of Sylvia's Best, St. Martin's Press, New York, 1986, ISBN 0-312-87757-9.
2. Tales from the Planet Sylvia, with introduction by Barbara Ehrenreich, St. Martin's Press, New York, 1990, ISBN 0-312-05166-2.
3. The Sylvia Chronicles: 30 Years of Graphic Misbehavior from Reagan to Obama, with introduction by Jules Feiffer, New Press, New York, 2010, ISBN 1-595-58494-3.

== Essays, humor, memoir ==
1. Tales of Graceful Aging from the Planet Denial, Broadway Books, New York, 2007, ISBN 0-767-92653-6.
2. We Ate Wonder Bread: A Memoir of Growing Up on the West Side of Chicago, Fantagraphics Books, Inc., Seattle, 2018, ISBN 1-683-96010-6.

== Books illustrated by Nicole Hollander ==
1. An ABC of Vice: An Insatiable Woman's Guide, by Regina Barreca and Nicole Hollander, Bibliopola Press, Storrs, CT, 2003, ISBN 0-939-88311-2.
2. Everything I Know About the Rat Race I Learned from My Cat, by Allia Zobel, Andrews McMeel, Kansas City, MO, 1999, ISBN 0-836-26842-3
3. Hot Henry, by Robie H. Harris, St. Martin's Press, New York, 1987, ISBN 0-312-01041-9.
4. I LOVE Messes!, by Robie H. Harris, Little, Brown, New York, 2005, ISBN 0-316-10946-0.
5. I'm All Dressed!, by Robie H. Harris, Little, Brown, New York, 2005, ISBN 0-316-10948-7.
6. I'm Not Sleepy!, by Robie H. Harris, Little, Brown, New York, 2005, ISBN 0-316-10941-X.
7. I'm So Mad!, by Robie H. Harris, Little, Brown, New York, 2005, ISBN 0-316-10939-8.
8. Messy Jessie, by Robie H. Harris, St. Martin's Press, New York, 1987, ISBN 0-312-01067-2.
9. The Tax-deductible Wedding: More Wedding and Fun, Less Fret and Debt, by Sabrina Rivers, GPP Life, Guilford, CT, 2010 ISBN 0-762-75086-3.
10. Women Who Love Cats Too Much, by Allia Zobel, Adams Pub., Holbrook, MA, 1995, ISBN 1-558-50541-5.
11. Women Who Still Love Cats Too Much, by Allia Zobel Nolan, Health Communications, Inc., Deerfield Beach, FL, 2015, ISBN 0-757-31872-X.
12. 101 Reasons Why a Cat is Better than a Man, by Allia Zobel, Bob Adams, Holbrook, MA, 1994, ISBN 1-558-50411-7.
13. 101 More Reasons Why a Cat is Better than a Man, by Allia Zobel, Adams Media Corp., Holbrook, MA, 1997, ISBN 1-558-50794-9.
14. 101 Reasons Why Cats Make Great Kids, by Allia Zobel, Adams Media, Holbrook, MA, 1996, ISBN 1-558-50639-X.
