= M. Jacqui Alexander =

Trinididadian academic

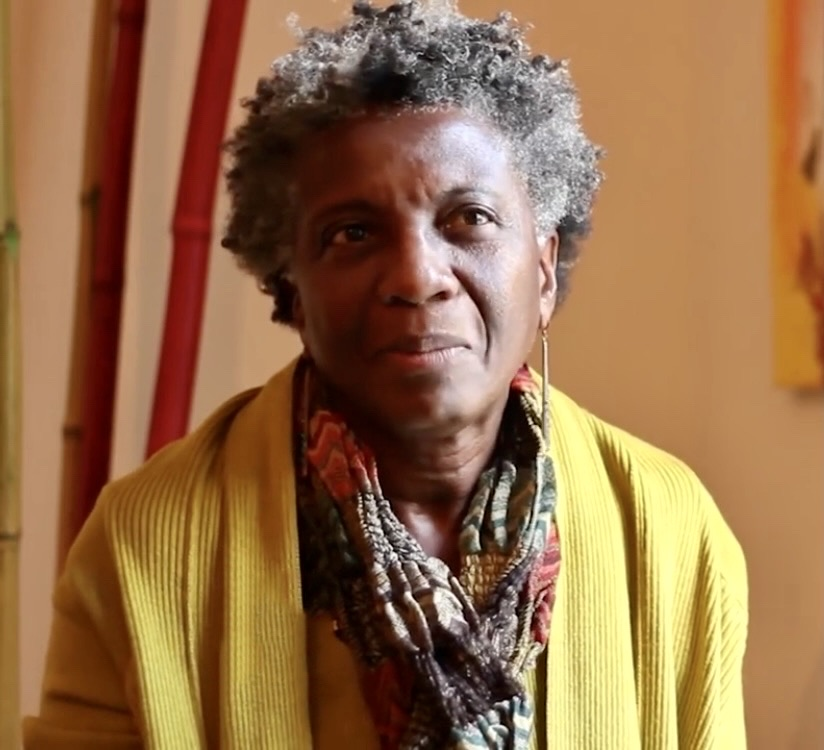
Alexander in 2016

M. Jacqui Alexander is a writer, teacher, and activist. She is both a Professor Emeritus at the Women and Gender Studies Department of the University of Toronto as well as the creator and director of the Tobago Centre "for the study and practice of indigenous spirituality". Jacqui Alexander is an enthusiast of "the ancient African (diasporic) spiritual systems of Orisa/Ifá, and a student of yoga and Vipassana meditation". She has received teachings on this meditative practice in Nigeria, the Kôngo, India, Haiti, Trinidad and Tobago, and New York. The themes of her work have captured a range of social justice subjects from the effects of imperialism, colonialism, and enslavement with special attention paid to the "pathologizing narratives" around homosexuality, gender, nationalism. Alexander's academic areas of interest specifically include: African Diasporic Cosmologies, African Diasporic Spiritual Practices, Caribbean studies, Gender and the Sacred, Heterosexualization and State Formation, Transnational feminism.

Driven by anti-colonial, feminist, women of color and queer movements globally, Alexander’s works have addressed the fundamentality of (hetero)sexuality to the "project of nation building; the pedagogical importance of teaching for justice; the need for a critical interdisciplinarity; and the sacred dimensions of women’s experience."

== History and scholarship ==
Alexander grew up in Trinidad and Tobago during a time of political unrest (circa 1960-70) when there were "Black Power" protests and the political formation of nationalist movements. She considered her generation to be the "first Black children to benefit from nationalist education."

In 1997, Alexander was teaching at Lang College, where she taught gender studies. She was denied tenure, and thus spurred a student and faculty movement called the "Mobilization for Real Diversity, Democracy, and Economic Justice" due to her being a popular professor but also on the basis of discrimination. The denial of her tenure developed into a hunger strike at Lang College, lasting 19 days. The students that protested were made up of students from many ethnic backgrounds as well as the LGBTQI community.

From 1998-2002, Alexander served as the Wangari Maathai Chair of the Department of Women's and Gender Studies at Connecticut College, in New London, CT. There, she evolved what had been a interdisciplinary certificate program into an official disciplinary major and minor. During her time at Connecticut College, Alexander organized a series of conferences and campus events, drawing multiracial feminist scholars including Angela Davis, Chrystos, Dionne Brand, Cherrí Moraga, Sonia Sanchez, Adrienne Rich, Mitsuye Yamada, and more.

In 2007, Alexander later spent time at Spelman College in Atlanta. This was funded by the Social Sciences and Humanities Council of Canada (SSHRC). The project, which included classes like Migrations of the Sacred: Gendered Spiritual Practices in an Era of Globalization, and Indigenous, Black and Immigrant Women in the Land of Dollars was a way to "track the effects of globalization and displacement on the spiritual communities of Aboriginal, African, and African descendant women, and to examine the spiritual technologies they used to heal themselves and their communities in the face of it all."

In 2013, there was a series of events dedicated to the legacies of Audre Lorde that was organized by the Community Arts Practice (CAP) Certificate Program and the Faculty of Environmental Studies at York University, in conjunction with Women and Gender Studies at the University of Toronto- the place of Alexander's work. The beginning of the series of events started with a lecture by Alexander titled "Medicines for Our Survival: Indigenous Knowledge and the Sacred."

Alexander is also a member of the Future of Minorities Research Project of Cornell University

Currently she is a Professor Emeritus at the University of Toronto in the Women, and Gender Studies department.

== The Tobago Centre ==
The Tobago Centre for the Study and Practice of Indigenous Spirituality is on a plot of land on Mt. St. George in Trinidad and Tobago that borders the Main Ridge Forest Reserve- the preserve has been protected since 1765 so it is the oldest in the Western Hemisphere. The center works to incorporate indigenous practices and peoples that are "rooted in the soil and energies of early Amerindian communities, as well as those practices that are indigenous to Africa and India and were transposed and shaped by local conditions stemming initially from enslavement and indenture".

Some of the activities done at the Tobago Centre are as follows:

- "Daily devotion, meditation and yoga with opportunities for prolonged, intensive study and reflection;
- Educational programs that include the cross-cultural study of sacred texts, accompanied by local and international residencies;
- Various cyclical ceremonial and spiritual gatherings that are community-based, local and regional;
- Sustainable cultivation of food and medicinal plants to root us to the Land and to teach us how to heal ourselves and our communities".

== Works ==
Her publications include Feminist Genealogies, Colonial Legacies, Democratic Futures (co-edited with Chandra Talpade Mohanty); Sing, Whisper, Shout, Pray! Feminist Visions for a Just World (co-edited with Lisa Albrecht, Sharon Day and Mab Segrest); and Pedagogies of Crossing: Meditations on Feminism, Sexual Politics, Memory and the Sacred as well as numerous papers like "Not Just (Any) Body Can Be a Citizen: The Politics of Law Sexuality and Postcoloniality in Trinidad and Tobago and the Bahamas" published in 1994 in the Feminist Review.

Her most recent publication, Pedagogies of Crossing: Meditations on Feminism, Sexual Politics, Memory and the Sacred, has garnered transnational attention.

=== Not Just (Any) Body Can Be a Citizen ===
In 1994, Alexander wrote "Not Just (Any) Body Can Be a Citizen: The Politics of Law, Sexuality and Postcoloniality in Trinidad and Tobago and the Bahamas" for Feminist Review.

==== Article summary ====
M. Jaqui Alexander uses the legislation passed in the 90's to illustrate the ways in which colonialist and imperialist thought has been implemented in the Caribbean in order to promote institutions of patriarchal heteronomativity in the financially vulnerable Islands. These pieces of legislation, i.e. the Sexual Offenses Act and Structural Adjustment policies; while executed with good intentions, only serve to promote the fetishization and commodification of Caribbean culture and the Black bodies that reside there.

At the time that Alexander was writing this article, Trinidad and Tobago was going through financial crisis, which resulted in the island nation having to turn to the IMF and World Bank to help bail them out of the debt that they had accrued throughout this financial crisis. Because of this, the IMF and World Bank were given the leverage to be able to impose large scale structural adjustment policies upon the island nation and collect an absorbent amount of interest. This occurrence and the result is addressed in Alexander’s journal entry. The journal entry itself is split into five sections that address various issues that Jaqui Alexander has found regarding “the politics of law, sexuality, and postcoloniality” in the island nation.

==== Naturalizing Heterosexuality ====
This section addresses the ways through which the Sexual Offenses Act, that was enacted in 1986, failed to promote feminism as it was intended. Instead, while the Act strove to protect women who fell victim to marital domestic violence, not only did it fail to explicitly name such acts as rape but it also failed to protect women who did not own physical property; those that were not economically beneficial were not deemed worthy of the same protections. Along with this failure, the Sexual Offenses Act introduced sodomy law to the island nation, effectively conflating violent heterosexuality (rape and violent assault) with consensual same sex relations through the lens of criminality, as well as serving to naturalize heterosexuality by deeming any alternative sexual practices (non procreative) as “unnatural” and “perverse”. Heterosexuality was economically efficient and any non procreative sex acts, those that colonial rule saw as performed by same sex couples and criminals (prostitutes and perverts), were economically inefficient and went against the naturalized heterosexual ideals.

==== State Nationalism and Respectability, Black Masculinity come to power 1962, 1972 ====
M. Jaqui Alexander uses this section to address the way that colonial rule naturalized whiteness through the simultaneous racialization and sexualization of black bodies. Colonial ideas of nationalism necessitated a nuclear family model that relies on strict gender binaries and imported strict family structures to the Caribbean through imperialism, thus schooling respectability into the emerging black middle class. After colonial rule, black masculinity was forced to prove itself through the policing of sexualized bodies and lead to what was seen as overly aggressive black males attempting to claim the spot as head of the household.

==== (Inter)national boundaries and strategies of legitimation ====
Alexander notes the effects of the financial crisis through the way that the structural adjustments, which were meant to privatize the market and reduce the public sector in order to reduce foreign debt outside of the IMF and World bank, have effectively forced more of the population into poverty and therefore forced more women into the workforce to add income to their household. Not only this but the struggles that male breadwinner have to keep their families from poverty have given rise to more women headed households. This result is addressed in section four, State nationalism, globalization and privatization, where the effect of women taking on public responsibility has added fuel to the proverbial fire. This is because the ways that the State legislates against women’s bodies while simultaneously relying on the sexualization of women’s bodies for the “political economy of desire” (economic gain), has fed into the fetishization of Caribbean culture through the role of cultural tourism. Making “Caribbean culture” into a commodity that can be bought and shown off.

==== Mobilizing Heterosexuality ====
Jaqui Alexander uses this last section to establish the correlation between monogamous heterosexuality, nationhood, and citizenship. She calls on feminist movements to analyze the patriarchy not only in terms of gender (masculinization) but also in terms of sexuality (heterosexualization). She also highlights the fact that the patriarchy cannot be dismantled and decolonized without addressing the ways certain bodies have been “ideologically dismembered,” through legislative, religious, economic discourses, the Body has been made to be inherently racialized and sexualized for the purpose of patriarchal benefit.
