= Firebrand Books =

Feminist and lesbian publishing house founded in Ithaca, New York

- Status: Inactive (website defunct since April 2015)
- Founded: 1984
- Founder: Nancy K. Bereano
- Country of origin: United States
- Headquarters location: Ithaca, New York (1984–2003); Ann Arbor, Michigan (2003–c. 2015)
- Key people: Nancy K. Bereano (founder, 1984–2000); Karen Oosterhouse (publisher, 2003–c. 2015)
- Publication types: Books
- Nonfiction topics: Feminist and lesbian fiction, nonfiction, and poetry
- Official website: www.firebrandbooks.com/about.html

Firebrand Books was a feminist and lesbian publishing house established in the fall of 1984 by Nancy K. Bereano, a lesbian and feminist activist, in Ithaca, New York. It is among the many feminist and lesbian publishing houses that grew out of the Women in Print Movement; other presses of that period include Naiad Press, Persephone, and Kitchen Table: Women of Color Press.

From 1984 to 2000, Firebrand Books published literary fiction, nonfiction, and poetry on lesbian and feminist themes across 104 titles, placing publisher Nancy Bereano "at the forefront of lesbian and small press publishing." The press earned four American Library Association Gay/Lesbian/Bisexual Book Awards and 12 Lambda Literary Awards, including the Publisher's Service Award for Bereano in 1996. The New York Times recognised three Firebrand titles among the top 25 books influencing queer culture since World War II.

After the press changed hands and relocated, its website went offline around April 2015 and the domain was subsequently listed for sale, indicating a cessation of active publishing operations under the Oosterhouse ownership.

== History ==
=== Founding and the Bereano era (1984–2000) ===
Nancy K. Bereano left the Crossing Press in the fall of 1984, where she had edited the Feminist Series for five years, publishing works including Audre Lorde's Sister Outsider and Marilyn Frye's The Politics of Reality. She founded Firebrand Books in a second-floor office at 141–143 East State Street on the Ithaca Commons, issuing her first list in the spring of 1985: Pat Parker's Jonestown and Other Madness, Mohawk Trail by Beth Brant, and Moll Cutpurse, Her True History by Ellen Galford.

Bereano has emphasised the importance of small independent presses in supporting "new ways of thinking," especially for readers marginalised by large publishing houses. Citing her experiences publishing Audre Lorde, she wrote:

The fact that [Lorde's] prose was published exclusively by small independently owned women's presses was both a result of the major houses' narrow perspective and the fact that Audre Lorde's prose, particularly her myth-shattering essays, was instrumental in framing a changing reality for many women, primarily lesbian women (a readership long dismissed by the mainstream publishing world).

Alison Bechdel has written of Bereano's influence: "she discovered me and published my first book when I was a punk kid.... She also urged me to write a graphic novel long before the current craze, and that was the beginning of Fun Home."

In 2000, Bereano sold Firebrand Books to LPC Group, the distributor that had been selling her list for the previous five years. Firebrand's editorial and financial records were subsequently donated to the Division of Rare and Manuscript Collections at Cornell University.

=== Sale, bankruptcy, and revival (2000–2003) ===
Following Bereano's sale, LPC Group filed for bankruptcy. Firebrand Books was to be auctioned as part of the liquidation of its assets. Karen Oosterhouse, a long-time reader and admirer of Firebrand's titles, purchased the press at auction, rescuing its backlist and history from dissolution. She relocated Firebrand from Ithaca to Ann Arbor, Michigan in 2003.

=== Oosterhouse era (2003–c. 2015) ===
Oosterhouse described Firebrand as "the independent publisher of record for feminist and lesbian fiction and nonfiction," championing "authors whose work has been marginalized: women of color, women coming out of poverty, trans women, the genderqueer, and other underrepresented voices." In a 2009 interview, Oosterhouse stated: "perhaps there will come a day when there is no longer a need for a specifically lesbian and feminist press, but for now Firebrand is that press." The Firebrand Books website went offline around April 2015 and the domain was subsequently listed for sale, signalling the effective end of the press's active operations.

== Notable publications ==
Firebrand Books published more than 100 titles during its Bereano-era operation, including works by:

- Dorothy Allison — Trash (1988; double Lambda Literary Award winner), Skin: Talking About Sex, Class And Literature
- Alison Bechdel — the complete Dykes to Watch Out For series
- Beth Brant — Mohawk Trail
- Cheryl Clarke — poetry collections
- Leslie Feinberg — Stone Butch Blues
- Jewelle Gomez — The Gilda Stories
- Audre Lorde — poetry
- Minnie Bruce Pratt — We Say We Love Each Other
- Ruthann Robson — Eye of a Hurricane
- Lesléa Newman — Good Enough to Eat
- Mab Segrest, Judith Katz, and others

== Historic recognition ==
=== Landmark designation (2022) ===
The four-story commercial brick building at 141–143 East State Street (the former Home Dairy building), constructed in 1872 and home to Firebrand Books from 1984 to 2000, was designated a local historic landmark by the Ithaca Common Council on 5 October 2022, acting on a recommendation from the Ithaca Landmarks Preservation Commission. The designation established the site as the first municipal landmark in Ithaca directly associated with women's and LGBTQ+ history, and the first landmark in Upstate New York with a primary historical connection to LGBTQ+ heritage. The landmark nomination was authored and spearheaded by Jeff Iovannone, a historian specialising in LGBTQ+ heritage conservation, then pursuing a graduate degree in Historic Preservation Planning at Cornell University.

=== Twelve Tribes controversy and plaque installation (2023–2024) ===
Following the landmark designation, plans to install a commemorative plaque on the building itself were blocked by the building's current owners, the Twelve Tribes religious group, who operate the Yellow Deli restaurant on the ground floor. The Twelve Tribes declined to grant the necessary consent, stating they wished to keep the building associated with its restaurant purpose. Bereano and others attributed the refusal in part to the Twelve Tribes' publicly stated opposition to homosexuality.

After eight months of negotiation, Iovannone and Bereano addressed the Common Council on 5 July 2023. The solution reached was to install the marker on City of Ithaca-owned property adjacent to the former building. On 15 June 2024, the historic marker was unveiled on the Ithaca Commons in a public ceremony, with speakers including Bereano, Iovannone, and Ithaca Mayor Robert Cantelmo. The marker is situated in view of the former Home Dairy building, near the Child of Ithaca sculpture.

== Archival records ==
The editorial and financial records of Firebrand Books from 1984 to 2000 are held at the Division of Rare and Manuscript Collections, Cornell University Library (Collection RMM07670).
