= Claire Kahane =

American writer, scholar and feminist literary critic

Claire Kahane (born 1935 in New York City) is an American writer, scholar and feminist literary critic. She is Professor Emerita of English at the University at Buffalo, where she taught from 1974 to 2000. Kahane is the author of Passions of the Voice, a study of narrative and "the strategies of hysteric discourse." Scholar Christine Wiesenthal, writing in the journal Victorian Review, wrote that "the confluence of feminist, narrative, and psychoanalytic theory" in Passions of the Voice was "an innovative and provocative mix." Kahane is also the co-editor, with Charles Bernheimer, of In Dora's Case, a collection of essays from a feminist perspective criticizing Sigmund Freud's efforts to "put words into Dora's mouth." Kahane completed her undergraduate education at the City College of New York and earned her Ph.D. from the University of California, Berkeley with a dissertation on the fiction of Flannery O'Connor.

== Bibliography ==
- (Co-editor, with Charles Bernheimer) In Dora's Case: Freud, Hysteria, Feminism (Columbia University Press, 1985; rpt.1990) ISBN 9780231059107
- Passions of the Voice: Hysteria, Narrative, and the Figure of the Speaking Woman, 1850-1915 (Johns Hopkins University Press, 1995) ISBN 9780801851612
- (Co-editor, with Shirley Garner and Madelon Sprengnether) "The (M)Other Tongue:Essays in Feminist Psychoanalytic Interpretation" (Cornell University Press, 1985).
