= Toni McNaron =

American literary scholar (born 1937)

- Born: April 3, 1937 (age 89); Alabama, U.S.
- Education: University of Alabama; Vanderbilt University; University of Wisconsin
- Employer: University of Minnesota

Toni McNaron, also known as Toni A. H. McNaron, (born April 3, 1937) is an American literary scholar, educator, and author. She is a professor emerita of English at the University of Minnesota, where she also served as the first coordinator of the university's Women's Studies Department. During her time at the University of Minnesota, McNaron received numerous awards for her teaching, leadership, and community service. McNaron also authored numerous articles, two memoirs, and several books on Shakespeare, LGBT-related issues and experiences, incest, and feminist literary criticism. McNaron retired from the university as a professor emerita in 2001.

McNaron also served as one of the founding editors of the feminist journal, Hurricane Alice: A Feminist Review, which ran from 1983 to 1998 and was first published in Minneapolis, MN.

== Early life and education ==
McNaron was born on April 3, 1937, in Alabama. In an interview with Lisa Westberg of the Minnesota Daily, McNaron stated that she grew up in the South; neither of her parents attended college but they "liked to read," and it was assumed that she would continue her education. "With the help of scholarships," Westberg writes, McNaron earned a bachelor's degree in English and Math from the University of Alabama in 1958, a master's in English and intellectual history from Vanderbilt University in 1960, and a Ph.D. in English and English history from the University of Wisconsin in 1964.

In her memoir, I Dwell in Possibilities: A Memoir, McNaron talks about the impact of growing up in Birmingham, Alabama during the Jim Crow era. For example, in 1963, she witnessed Bull Connor's releasing of dogs and training horses on black families leaving church. Chapters such as "Into the Cauldron" describe how this and other experiences throughout her youth and early adulthood were formative and contributed to her lifelong commitment to understanding race and racism.

== Personal life ==
According to an interview in 1997 with Deb Price, McNaron came out as a lesbian in 1973, when she also stopped drinking and entered a new phase of her life. During this period, she also became a feminist and an anti-Vietnam War activist.

When McNaron came out as a lesbian in 1973, she did so publicly to her students in class. McNaron was the first faculty member at the University of Minnesota to come out as lesbian or gay. During the same period, Minnesota educator and State Senator Allan Spear, who is credited with being the nation's first openly gay legislator, came out in 1974 and was also among the first openly gay or lesbian faculty at the University of Minnesota.

In her memoir, Into the Paradox: Conservative Spirit, Radical Politics, McNaron traces her spiritual path, beginning with a tiny Episcopal church that was scoffed at by Alabama Baptists who didn't accepts Jews, Catholics, or Episcopalians. After years at Episcopal churches, McNaron found a liberal Catholic church in Minneapolis and became an active member.

== Career ==
Before joining the faculty at the University of Minnesota in 1964 as assistant professor in English, McNaron was an instructor at All Saints' College (Vicksburg, MS) 1959-1961 and a teaching assistant at the University of Wisconsin (1961–1963).

McNaron spent the rest of her career in the Department of English at the University of Minnesota, Twin Cities campus, in Minneapolis, MN. She was assistant professor from 1964 to 1967, associate professor from 1967 to 1983, and a full professor from 1983 to 2001, when she became a professor emerita. Her research and teaching interests during this period included feminist criticism and feminist pedagogy, multicultural learning and teaching, as well as Shakespeare, Virginia Woolf, Emily Dickinson, Lesbian literature and poetry, and Milton.

== Early Contributions to Women's Studies and LGBTQ+ Studies ==
McNaron developed an interest in the treatment of women in society as early as 1954 when, as an undergraduate, she was told by a professor that once she received her BA degree she would have to decide to either pursue "education, and a career" or "get married." This "intolerable choice" led her to become more concerned about the status of women in society. Later in her career, McNaron was also influenced by militant feminist activities in New York in the early 1970s, adding that "I didn't necessarily approve of their tactics; nevertheless, I had to thank them. They brought the issue of being a woman to my attention." As a result, her English lectures "took on a new twist," and she began asking her literature students "to examine and question social sexual stereotypes more closely."

=== Women's Studies Program at the University of Minnesota ===
During this period in the early 1970s, McNaron became an influential voice in the new Women's Studies Program at the University of Minnesota, which was established in 1973. McNaron was selected from 100 applicants by the Regents to serve as its first coordinator, a position she held from 1973 to 1976. McNaron also served as the director of the graduate program in Women's Studies from 1980 to 1984. The University of Minnesota Women's Studies Department was notable because it was the first in the country to offer a Women's Studies major. By its 25th anniversary in 1998, it offered a Ph.D. program, one of only six in the country.

As stated in a profile of McNaron by Judy Vick in 1976, one of McNaron's priorities as coordinator of the Women's Studies Program was to conduct research to aid in the development of a feminist pedagogical practice:

McNaron...hopes [her research] will lead to the development of a feminist philosophy of education. She defines feminism as a "belief system--a very simple, but radical, notion that puts women in the center of life and culture...with men. I'm not interested in putting men down and reversing what was done to me." After researching the possibility of a feminist pedagogy, she plans to put what she's learned into practice.

As the coordinator of the Women's Studies program, throughout the 1970s McNaron consulted with other colleges and universities interested in establishing women's studies programs, including the University of Iowa, the University of South Dakota, Macalester College, Carleton College, and Minneapolis Community and Technical College. During this period, McNaron was also involved with national organizations such as the National Women's Studies Association, which had its first national conference in 1979. She served as a member of the organization's first steering committee from 1977 to 1978.

During this time, McNaron also pioneered efforts to make LGBTQ+ issues visible and to increase academic attention and student support at the university. She wrote a book on the experience of lesbian and gay academics and taught the first course on lesbian literature, which inspired at least one graduate student from Oberlin College to move to Minnesota. In connection with her efforts to advocate for the LGBT community, McNaron received a Breaking the Silence Award from the University of Minnesota Gay/Lesbian/Bisexual/Transgender Employee Network commemorating National Coming Out Week and the 4th anniversary of the GLBT Programs Office.

=== The Schochet Center for Gay, Lesbian, Bisexual, and Transgender Studies ===
The Schochet Center for Gay, Lesbian, Bisexual, and Transgender Studies opened in July 2000. The goals of the Schochet Center were to create a vibrant and productive center for teaching, learning, research, and community outreach; to foster academic and public discussion of GLBT issues; and to bridge gaps between the university and the community. The center was the first such center in the Midwest and the third in the nation. The development of the Schochet Center began in 1996 with a memorandum of understanding between the university and Steven J. Schochet to establish an endowment to make the university a more humane place for GLBT students. According to the Gender and Sexuality Center for Queer and Trans Life at the University of Minnesota, while a student at the university in the late 1950s, Schochet experienced harassment and threats of expulsion for his sexual orientation. After a successful career in the computer industry, Schochet decided to make a "gift of accountability" to the university.

In 1997, the university convened a GLBT Studies Endowment Committee to establish a vision for the endowment and to set goals for GLBT studies at the university. McNaron was one of ten members of the Committee which, along with Beth Zemsky, Director of GLBT Programs, planned for the launch of GLBT studies. Zemsky and McNaron led the effort to get university recognition and funding for a Center for GLBT Studies, which included visiting deans from colleges throughout the university. Among the early activities of the Schochet Center was an annual lecture series. McNaron gave the first lecture in the series, and Allan Spear the second.

== Pedagogical Initiatives at the University of Minnesota ==
=== College in the Schools (CIS) ===
From 1996 to 2023, McNaron served as the Faculty Coordinator for Literature for College in the Schools, a program which allows high school students to get a head start on their college and career plans while earning college credit. During her tenure, CIS served 15,000-20,000 high school students and enhanced the professional development of 200 high school teachers. Notable guest speakers who have participated in the CIS program include author Kao Kalia Yang, poet and writer Heid Erdrich, and Sarah Bellamy, artistic director for the Penumbra Theater Company.

=== Voices from the Gaps (North American Writers of Color) (VG) ===
In 1996, along with Carol Miller, a professor of American Studies and American Indian Studies, and graduate student Laurie Dickinson, McNaron developed Voices from the Gaps (VG), a website with a mission to "uncover, highlight, and share works of marginalized artists, predominantly women writers of color living and working in North America."

Originally hosted by the English Department and now hosted by and searchable through the university's Digital Conservancy, the site was an innovative, technology-enhanced learning initiative at the time. Maureen Smith, writing in 1999, described its pedagogical mission:

The pioneering site’s focus was largely educational, aimed at a diverse audience of students in secondary schools and institutions of higher education. Created just as Internet use exploded, VG reached a global readership and cultivated a collaborative and intercommunal group of scholars, students, educators, and women artists. Students, volunteers, and VG readers submitted the majority of the site’s entries, including author biographies, book reviews, academic essays, and interviews with women artists. Additionally, the site’s creators developed a robust selection of pedagogical materials to help instructors incorporate VG resources in secondary school and undergraduate classrooms.

The site was revised twice to include multimedia files and to expand the scope of the collection to “feature women artists regardless of genre of work, race, minority status, or geographical location." McNaron and Miller received the 1999-2000 Center for Independent Studies of Writing Excellence in Teaching Award from the University of Minnesota, an award that honors those making an important contribution to the teaching of writing, for their development of the site, which the Center described as “an audience-participatory Web site devoted to women writers of color.”

=== Center for Educational Innovation (CEI) ===
McNaron also served as a founding director of the university's Center for Teaching and Learning Services, which led to the creation of the Early Career Teaching Program: Pursuing Excellence in Multicultural Education program for faculty at the university.

In 2017, McNaron was recognized by the CEI at the University of Minnesota for her commitment to teaching excellence in its publication, Innovative Teaching and Learning: Experiments Across the Disciplines, in a dedication entitled “To Toni A. H. McNaron.” The publication, edited by Irene D. Alexander and Robert K Poch, noted that, as “a founding director of the University of Minnesota’s Center for Teaching and Learning Services, and creator of the ‘Early Career Teaching Program: Pursuing Excellence in Multicultural Education,’ [McNaron] exemplified her belief that institutional excellence derives from ‘curriculum, instruction, and scholarship that are culturally informed and inclusive of the students and larger society the University serves." The editors recognized McNaron for her influence on both students and other teachers, noting that her teaching style challenged students to “do brilliant things” and supported them “in their individual and collective learning journeys,” and that her pedagogical practice called “attention to the possibilities that emerge when teachers talk with one another–through reflection, story, testimony, and scholarship–especially when in these dialogues teachers seek to understand learning, to see learners, and to expand teaching practices.”

== Community Education and Outreach ==
=== Reading Groups for Adults ===
Starting in 1980, McNaron began decades-long engagement in community-based initiatives when a small group of women approached McNaron and asked her to facilitate a group to read works by women writers, a group she led for 45 years. In a 2025 blog post entitled, “Where to Teach,” McNaron described how her experiences with first-generation college students early in her teaching career inspired her to later develop reading groups for adults:

When I began to teach at the University of Minnesota (1964), many students told me they were the first in their family to go to college. As students in a Shakespeare course, they felt "stupid" because they had never seen one of his plays or read one of his plays. I was gifted with these words as my answer: "You are not stupid; you are ignorant because you have not been exposed to Shakespeare. You are taking this course to get exposed to him and it is my job to help you do that." As time went on, I decided it might be my job to help adults get exposed to wonderful writers, so I became interested in ways to do that initially through the University, but eventually through a variety of avenues.

McNaron's first “outreach to community education” grew out of her teaching experiences in the Extension Division of the University of Minnesota.

[Edith Mucke ran] a program out of the Extension Division with the nickname "Rusty Ladies." It was attended by very smart white women, often graduates of prestigious schools, who were married to men climbing their professional ladders fast. Their wives were expected to enhance that progress but not be independent thinkers. When [Edith] asked me to teach a class in downtown Minneapolis, I jumped at the chance. I stopped referring to the group by the odious nickname and we read and discussed wonderful books as the women began to grasp that they still had brains and that I was asking them to turn up the volume.

Throughout her career, McNaron has led multiple, long-running reading groups for adults in the local community who wish to develop their understanding of literature and critical thinking skills. These groups include a monthly women's book group that McNaron formed forty-five years ago, two sessions of Shakespeare in the Living Room, discussions of Greek tragedies, and the popular Books in the Garden reading group that met at the Minnesota Landscape Arboretum.

=== Collaborations with Illusion Theater ===
On several occasions, McNaron collaborated with Illusion Theater, which was founded in 1974 by two of her former students, Bonnie Morris and Michael Robins. Illusion Theater's mission is “to create theater that illuminates the illusions, myths and realities of our times and to catalyze personal and social change." In 1976–77, Morris, Robins, and McNaron created Several Stray Matters, a play adapted from the works of Virginia Woolf, which led to a second production Orlando, Orlando based on a Woolf novel. McNaron was the literary consultant for Orlando, Orlando and presented workshops as part of eight performances in high schools, colleges and universities throughout Greater Minnesota in 1978. In 2010, McNaron was the Willa Cather scholar on an adaptation of My Antonia, which toured throughout Minnesota and Nebraska, and was reprised several times, including in 2014 in Minneapolis and in 2019 at the Lied Center for the Performing Arts at the University of Nebraska. In 2024, Illusion Theater's 50th anniversary series included an evening showcasing McNaron's commentary on short performances from Shakespeare's four romances, the subject of McNaron's book, Live and Deal With Others Better: The Gift of Shakespeare’s Romances.

=== Maiden Rock Women's Learning Institute ===
In 1975 McNaron and four other women came together as a collective to create a feminist alternative learning community. They found property near Maiden Rock, Wisconsin, that included an abandoned cattle barn. They remodeled it to accommodate groups for week-long sessions, and began offering courses in 1976 both at the Maiden Rock Women's Learning Institute and in the Twin Cities. Courses covered a wide range of topics and were taught by University of Minnesota faculty, therapists, artists, building contractors, wilderness guides, musicians, playwrights, and women from other fields. McNaron, also a member of the program planning group, taught several classes including Remaking Our Myths, Heritage, Lesbian Culture, Women and the Professions: How To Be “In” Them and Not “Of” Them, and Women's Poetry: Then, Now and Later. In addition to classes, the Maiden Rock Collective also hosted gatherings including one on May 1, 1977, advertised as the 1st annual lesbian gathering which “is the first time to our knowledge that lesbians have celebrated together their coming-out process.” The collective discontinued the Women's Learning Institute after two years of classes because it was unable to raise enough money to continue.

=== So's Your Old Lady (journal) ===
McNaron staffed and contributed to So’s Your Old Lady, a lesbian feminist journal with 22 issues published from February 1973 until September 1979. The journal included feature articles, poetry, essays, community news, photography and graphic arts. So’s Your Old Lady was started at the Lesbian Resource Center, which was founded in 1972, and which published the first 15 issues. McNaron joined the staff in 1975 and worked on issue #7 and all subsequent issues until the journal moved with one of its contributors to the University of Maryland. She also contributed feature articles and poems, including a poem entitled “Lesbian Themes in Modern American Literature” about the trepidation she felt before walking into a classroom to teach the first class of this first-ever course. The University of Minnesota Libraries has preserved a complete publication run of So’s Your Old Lady in The Jean-Nickolaus Tretter Collection in GLBT Studies.

=== Hurricane Alice (journal) ===
In the 1980s, McNaron was one of the founding editors of the influential feminist journal, Hurricane Alice: A Feminist Review, which was founded in Minneapolis, MN, by a volunteer group of academics, graduate students, university staff, and community members. Active from 1983 to 1998, the journal published work by a number of notable established and emerging feminist voices, including work by Jewelle Gomez, Susan Griffin, Alice Walker, and Nellie Wong, as well as original graphics by area artists.

== Awards ==
McNaron has received numerous awards for her teaching, leadership, and community service, including the following:

- 1968: UMN Alumni Association Award for Outstanding Contributions to Undergraduate Education, which recognizes faculty for outstanding contributions to undergraduate education and contributes to the improvement of undergraduate education at the university by publicizing honorees’ work to serve as a resource for the whole faculty
- 1967: Outstanding Teacher Award. College of Liberal Arts, University of Minnesota
- 1969: Morse Alumni Outstanding Teaching Award, University of Minnesota
- 1990: Ruth Christie Award for Outstanding Teaching, Department of English, University of Minnesota
- 1991: Continuing Education and Extension Award for Outstanding Teaching, University of Minnesota
- 1998: Women's Leadership Award, University of Minnesota
- 1998: Academy of Distinguished Teachers Award from the University of Minnesota (specifically, the Horace T. Morse-University of Minnesota Alumni Association Award for Outstanding Contributions to Undergraduate Education)
- 1999: Center for Independent Studies of Writing Excellence in Teaching Award
- 2000: President's Outstanding Service Award, University of Minnesota

== Publications ==
=== Selected Works ===
McNaron is the author and/or co-editor of several academic books about feminism, feminist literary criticism, incest, and LGBT-related issues and experiences, including in academia.

For example, in her 1997 book, Poisoned Ivy: Lesbian and Gay Academics Confronting Homophobia, published by Temple University Press, McNaron documented the lesbophobic and homophobic workplace bullying in academia that academics have been subjected to by their peers and institutions after coming out. Scholar Maureen Reddy wrote that Poisoned Ivy brought together McNaron's "personal narrative, the results of a study she conducted of three hundred-plus gay and lesbian academics, and insights gleaned from other research to construct this multidimensional portrait of the academy during the past three decades." Although Poisoned Ivy was originally meant to be an autobiography focusing on McNaron's experiences as a closeted academic, it eventually expanded into a detailed chronicle of attitudinal and policy changes in academia from the 1960s to 1990s, including McNaron's home department at the University of Minnesota:

[O]ne catalyst for this project was the very positive reception accorded to two gay men--partners--hired by her department in 1992. Between her own hiring in 1964 and the arrival of these colleagues nearly thirty years later, "the picture at the University of Minnesota was dismal and frightening." The difference between her experiences as a closeted, young professor and the experience of her new, entirely out colleagues evidently prompted McNaron to think about what changes had occurred in the academy and what still [remained] to be done, and she shifted her focus to a blend of ethnographic and autobiographical study.

Calling the book a "treasure of information of the challenges faced by lesbian and gay faculty," reviewer Shane Phelan wrote that "Poisoned Ivy details the past and present cost of homophobia to lesbian and gay faculty, to research agendas focused on queer populations and ideas, and to institutions that lose the energy and commitment of faculty."

=== Other Notable Works ===
- McNaron, Toni A. H.; Morgan, Yarrow, eds. (1982). Voices in the Night: Women Speaking About Incest. Minneapolis, Minnesota: Cleis Press. ISBN 9780939416028. OCLC 8844050.
- McNaron, Toni A. H. (1983). The Sister Bond: A Feminist View of a Timeless Connection. New York City: Pergamon Press. ISBN 9780080323664. OCLC 240100498.
- McNaron, Toni A. H. (1996). New Lesbian Studies: Into the 21st Century. New York City: Feminist Press. ISBN 9781558611368. OCLC 233862963.
- McNaron, Toni A. H. (1997). Poisoned Ivy: Lesbian and Gay Academics Confronting Homophobia. Philadelphia: Temple University Press. ISBN 9781566394888. OCLC 1020196424.
- McNaron, Toni A. H. (2002). I Dwell in Possibility: A Memoir (Revised ed.). New York City: The Feminist Press (published 1992). ISBN 9781558614178. OCLC 957127048.
- McNaron, Toni A. H. (2013). Into the Paradox: Conservative Spirit, Feminist Politics. Minneapolis, Minnesota: Hurley Publications. ISBN 9780989534123. OCLC 869298588.
- McNaron, Toni A. H. (2013). Live and Deal With Others Better: The Gift of Shakespeare's Romances. Minneapolis, Minnesota: Hurley Publications. ISBN 9780989534109. OCLC 1453253563.
