= Sylvia (comic strip) =

American comic strip by Nicole Hollander

- Author: Nicole Hollander
- Website: http://www.gocomics.com/sylvia/
- Current status/schedule: Daily
- Launch date: March 21, 1980
- End date: March 2012
- Syndicate(s): Tribune Media Services
- Genre(s): Humor, feminism, satire
- Preceded by: Feminist Funnies

Sylvia is a comic strip by American cartoonist Nicole Hollander that offered commentary on political, social and cultural topics—and on cats—primarily in the voice of its title character, Sylvia. The strip was introduced on March 21, 1980. Distributed to newspapers nationally by Tribune Media Services, Sylvia appeared online at Hollander's blog, Bad Girl Chats, but that domain now redirects to a commercial site. On March 26, 2012, Hollander announced "Sylvia's retirement from the newspaper business."

== Publication history ==
Sylvia began as a continuation of Hollander's cartoons for a feminist magazine, The Spokeswoman, collected in Hollander's 1979 book of cartoons, I’m in Training to Be Tall and Blonde. The book's success led Tribune Media Services to distribute Sylvia to newspapers as a daily comic strip beginning in 1980.

Hollander has published 19 Sylvia collections, including The Whole Enchilada (1982), Tales from the Planet Sylvia (1990), with an introduction by Barbara Ehrenreich, and The Sylvia Chronicles: 30 Years of Graphic Misbehavior from Reagan to Obama (2010), with an introduction by Jules Feiffer.
