= Poetry Flash =

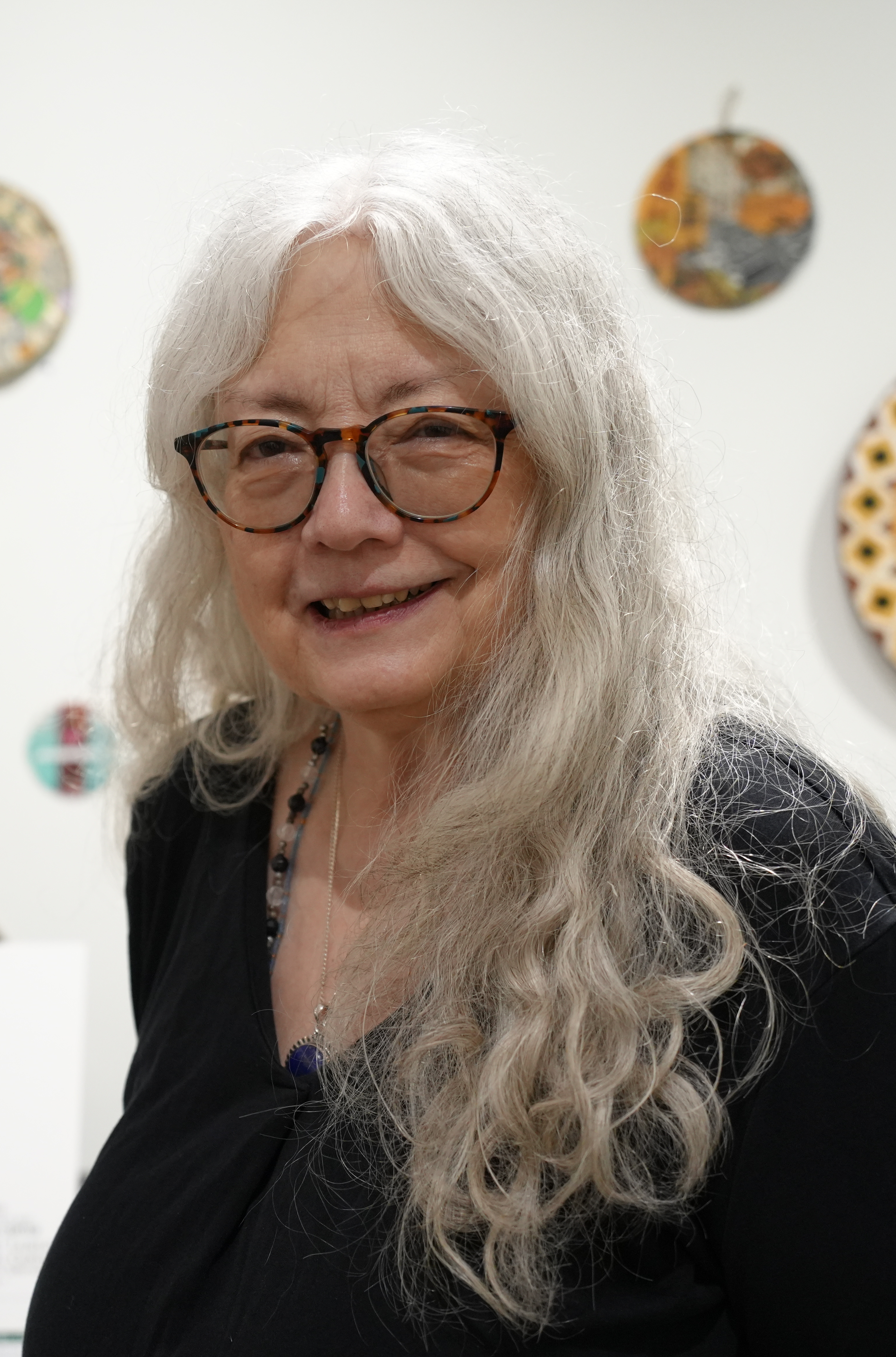
- Joyce Jenkins at the Sierra Poetry Festival 2025
- Type: Quarterly
- Format: tabloid & online
- Publisher: Joyce Jenkins
- Editor: Joyce Jenkins
- Founded: 1972
- Headquarters: Berkeley, California
- ISSN: 0737-4747
- Website: poetryflash.org

Poetry Flash (founded 1972) is a literary magazine and website based in the San Francisco Bay Area; it has been called "an institution in the Bay Area's literary culture". It publishes literary reviews, poetry, interviews, and essays as well as an extensive calendar of literary activities on the west coast of the United States.

Poetry Flash is a non-profit corporation. The printed version presently has a tabloid format, appears quarterly, and has a print run of 22,000 copies. Copies are distributed gratis at cafes and shops in the Bay Area or are mailed to paid subscribers. Joyce Jenkins has edited Poetry Flash since 1978; it was founded in 1972 as a mimeographed calendar of Bay Area poetry readings. Jenkins has been the publisher of Poetry Flash since 1980.
