= Sharon Day (activist) =

Ojibwe leader and Native American activist, artist and writer

Sharon Day (born 1951) is an Ojibwe leader and Native American activist, artist and writer from Minnesota. She is an enrolled member of the Bois Forte Band of Ojibwe. Day is most known for her water walks, a spiritual practice in which Day and others carry water for a long distances to raise awareness and pray for the health and future of the waterways.

== Early life ==
The Ojibwe people are centered around the Great Lakes and Northern Midwest of the United States and extending north into Canada.

Day was born in northern Minnesota. Her parents were Ojibwe from the Bois Forte Band. Day was raised within the tribal culture. She describes hauling water as a twice-daily occurrence, an act that gave her a lifelong respect for water. Day had a difficult childhood. She struggled to find a place for herself within her community as a lesbian. At the age of 21, she entered a recovery program for alcohol dependency, and subsequently studied chemical dependency and administration at the University of Minnesota. Following graduation, Day worked for the state of Minnesota as a chemical dependency program manager. Day was not raised to follow the religious and spiritual beliefs of the Ojibwe as a child, however at some point she became a Midewin, a spiritual practitioner of the Anishinaabe faith tradition.

== AIDS activism ==
In the mid-1980s, Day began hearing about the emerging acquired immunodeficiency syndrome (AIDS) epidemic. Initially, reports of the illness were constricted to the East and West coast. In 1987, Day learned of two people she knew who had acquired HIV. She first encountered Carol LaFavor, an Ojibwe woman who would later become an AIDS activist and subject of the film, Her Giveaway. LaFavor had recently discovered that she was HIV-positive and, as both a Native American and lesbian woman, feared that she would be unable to get appropriate medical care. LaFavor pointed out that there were no health or educational services for Native people related to AIDS and challenged Day, asking "what are you going to do about it?"

Shortly after, Day learned that her brother, Michael, was also HIV-positive. Day and her family were devastated by the news, because "at that time, 1987, if you had AIDS, you were going to die." Shortly thereafter, Day began engaging in community outreach to Native Americans centered around the AIDS crisis. This activity coalesced into the Indigenous People's Task Force, a grassroots organization providing education and services to the Native American community of Minnesota. In the early years, Day dealt with a many gay and lesbian Native Americans and intravenous drug users who were alienated from the community. Some of the people she got to know in the early years died from the disease. She recalls that "it was a very frightening, very devastating time." The organization eventually began offering HIV testing, counseling and prevention services and help in getting treatment. Day continues to serve as the executive director of the task force.

== Water and the environment ==
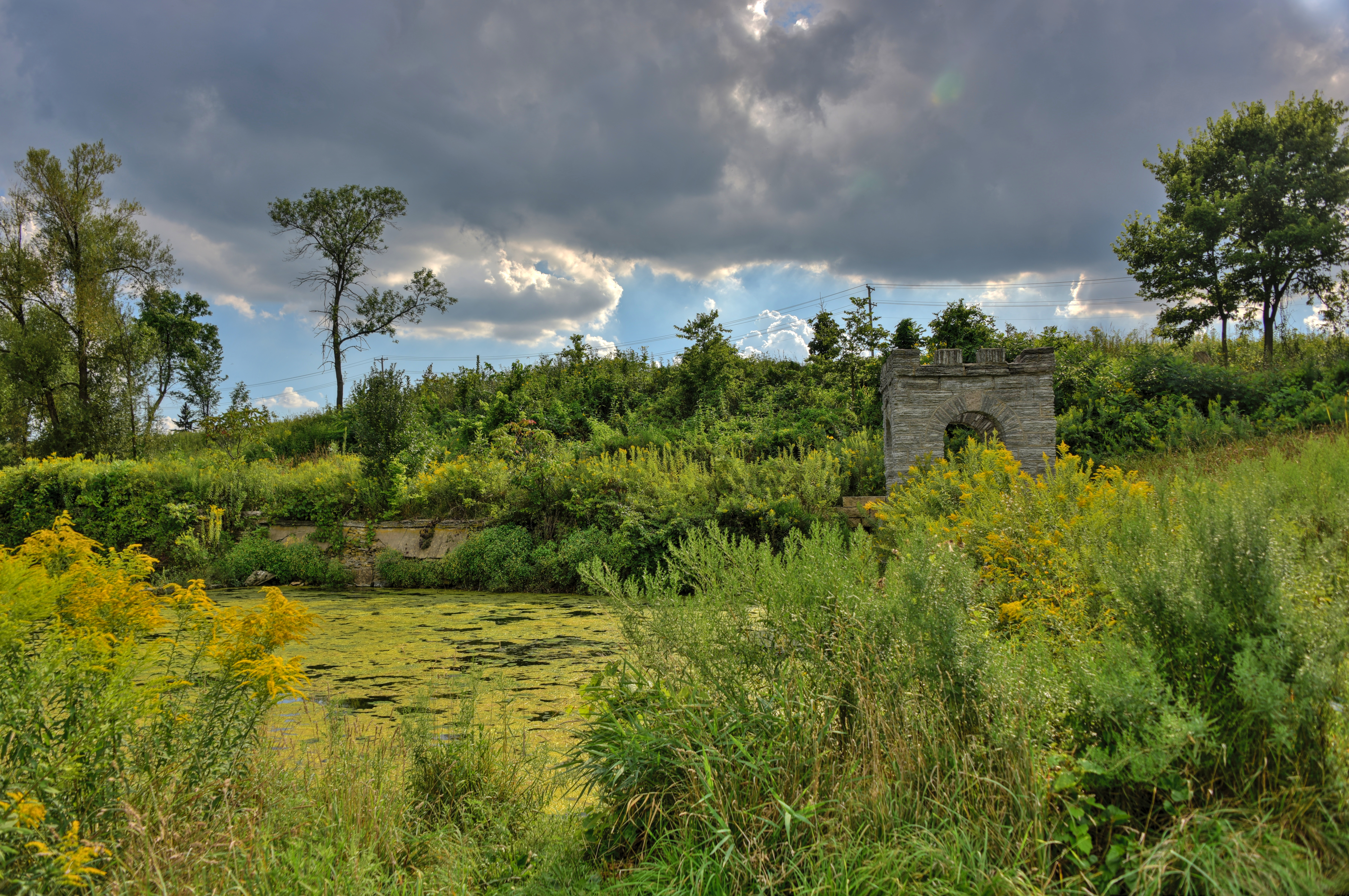
The Coldwater Spring site, a spiritually important location for Day and other Native Americans of the Northern Midwest, in 2016. The area around the spring was added to the Mississippi National River and Recreation Area in 2010.

In 1998, Day got involved with a movement to protect Coldwater Spring, a site that is considered sacred by several Native Americans tribes near the Mississippi River in south Minneapolis, Minnesota from a threatened rerouting of a highway. Access, use and control of the site were contested. As Day became involved with protesting some of the development plans for the spring, she was arrested several times for acts of civil disobedience. Later, Day came to feel that some direct action was counterproductive, and that spending days in jail for civil disobedience placed an unfair burden on lower income and non-white activists, noting that "80% of the jails are already filled with people of color." Day assisted in preserving sacred practices at the spring by leading ceremonies and providing traditional offerings.

By 2003, Day began planning and leading a series of Nibi Walks. The word nibi means water in Ojibwe. Nibi walks involve carrying water along the river and serve as an extended prayer. The water walks often travel in the direction of the current and can span many miles. At first the walks were relatively short, however in 2011, Day was involved in organizing a four directions water walk. Water from the Pacific, Atlantic, Arctic-Hudson waterway and the Gulf of Mexico were brought to a convergence point by the walkers and poured into Lake Superior. Day represented the southern direction and carried water from the Gulf of Mexico.

Day conceives of the walks and her water activism as a part of her religious and spiritual practice. In her culture, care for the water was traditionally the woman's job (while men cared for fire). On water walks, only women carry the water. Day perceives her life within the continuous span of existence, from ancestors to her great-grandchildren, recognizing that "it is our intention to make sure there is water to nourish our great-great-great grandchildren seven generations into the future. We do this because someone did this for us. My ancestors knew that one day I would be here. They sang the songs and offered the prayers so that I would be able to enjoy life."

In 2017, Day led a group on a 54 day water walk along the Missouri river, beginning at the headwaters in Montana and concluding in Missouri. The group took turns carrying a pail of water collected at the headwaters. Day describes the walks as having both spiritual significance and a practical purpose in raising awareness about water pollution. Day describes the act of bringing clean water from the headwaters to the river's end as "giving the river a taste of herself. We say to her this is how you began, pure and clean. This is how we wish for you to be again."

In 2013, Day wrote publicly against Native American tribes attempting to renegotiate treaties to allow for a portion of profits raised from fossil fuel energy extraction to flow to tribes. She argued that preserving the land and traditional ways was more important than entering into a wealth building exercise based on greed, though she thought that renewable energy projects would be better aligned with native practices.

In 2015, Day helped organize a protest at the Minnesota state capitol against oil pipelines bringing fossil fuel from the Canadian tar sands through the northern Midwest. Her opposition was motivated by a concern for the future, stating that "the fossil fuel industry thinks it is powerful, but it is the water and the people that are powerful. These waterways are our lifeblood. If you want your grandchildren’s grandchildren to have life and clean water, then we must all do what we can.”

== Artist and writer ==
In 2003, Day co-edited a feminist anthology, Sing! Whisper! Shout! Pray! Feminist Visions for a Just World. The book, a collection of essays and poems, sought to build a more inclusive version of feminism. The piece shows how women of color have been deeply invested in the feminist movement, even as their contributions sometimes went unrecognized historically.

In 2018, Day's play, We Do It For The Water, premiered at Pangea World Theater, a Minneapolis-based theater company, with the Ikidowin Youth Ensemble. The play presented a message of peace and unity between native and non-native people who seek to preserve the water, and was performed by a Native youth ensemble.

Following the George Floyd protests in the summer of 2020, Day felt sidelined from the activist energy in the Twin Cities. As an older person, she felt that she could not fully take part out of concern about the coronavirus. She became inspired to create a large scale art installation, a 12-foot tall driftwood sculpture titled Tree of Peace, Tree of Life, Tree of the Future. Day asked contributors to create leaves for the tree sculpture consisting of their wishes and prayers for the future. The piece was raised at the Minnesota state capitol in October, 2020, before traveling to various art galleries and a permanent home with the Piscataway people of Maryland.

Day was featured in a short film, Nibi Walk, presented at the 2020 Environmental Film Festival in Washington D.C.
