= Maureen Brady =

American writer and editor (born 1943)

- Born: June 7, 1943 (age 83) Mount Vernon, New York, U.S.
- Occupation: Writer; Editor; Educator
- Language: English
- Genre: Literary fiction; Feminist literature; LGBTQ literature
- Notable works: Folly; Ginger's Fire; Give Me Your Good Ear
- Partner: Martha

Maureen Brady (born June 7, 1943) is an American writer, editor, and educator. She is best known for her novels Ginger's Fire, Folly, and Give Me Your Good Ear. She currently lives and works in New York City and Woodstock, New York.

== Personal life ==
Brady was born on June 7, 1943, in Mount Vernon, New York and spent her adolescence in Florida. She practiced as a physical therapist and also taught physical therapy at Russell Sage College, Troy, New York. In 1977, she attended a new school workshop in writing which gave her the confidence to begin writing. She currently lives in New York with her partner, Martha.

== Career ==
In 1982, she wrote the novel Folly out of a desire to cast a woman who was an outsider in her community splintered by racism, homophobia, patriarchy, and capitalism as a hero. The novel focuses on a workers strike of North Carolina garment workers with various sub-plots about the diverse set of characters lives in a segregated town. The novel has been described as "pro-labor, feminist, anti-racist, queer positive." In 1994, it was reprinted as a classic by The Feminist Press.

Brady has received awards and fellowships from the Ludwig Vogelstein Foundation, the New York State Creative Arts Public Service program of the New York State Council on the Arts, the Briarcombe Foundation, and the Virginia Center for the Creative Arts.

In 1978, Brady founded the lesbian feminist publishing company Spinsters Ink with Judith McDaniel. As one of the oldest lesbian feminist publishers in the world, Spinsters Ink is widely regarded as a pioneering feminist institution. Brady has served as the editor of many books, including The Cancer Journals by Audre Lorde, Spinsters Ink (1980), and The Words of a Woman Who Breathes Fire: Poetry and Prose by Kitty Tsui, Spinsters Ink (1983).

A page from one of Brady's manuscripts was included in "Statements from Lesbian Artists", which accompanied the 1978 exhibition A Lesbian Show. Curated by Harmony Hammond, the show was the first lesbian-identified art exhibition in the United States.

Brady has taught writing at Skidmore College, Bard College, and The Resource Center for Accessible Living in Kingston, NY. She currently teaches creative writing at New York University, the New York Writers Workshop and the Peripatetic Writing Workshop.

Brady serves as the board president of the Barbara Deming Memorial Fund.

== Bibliography ==
- Give Me Your Good Ear, Spinsters Ink (1979)
- Folly: A Novel, Feminist Press at the City University of New York (1982)
- The Question She Put to Herself, Crossing Press (1987)
- Daybreak: Meditations for Women Survivors of Sexual Abuse, Hazelden Publishing (1991)
- Beyond Survival: A Writing Journey for Healing Childhood Sexual Abuse, HarperCollins (1992)
- Midlife: Meditations for Women, HarperCollins (1995)
- Ginger's Fire: A Novel, Alice Street Editions/Harrington Park Press (2005)
- Getaway: A Novel, Bacon Press Books (2018)
- Tessa's Landing: A Novel, Rootstock Publishing (2026)

== Anthologies ==
- Lesbian Texts and Contexts: Radical Revisions, NYU Press (1990)
- Lovers: Stories by Women, Crossing Press (1992)
- Catholic Girls, Plume (1992)
- Contemporary Lesbian Writers of the United States: A Bio-Bibliographical Sourcebook, Greenwood Press (1993)
- A Loving Testimony: Remembering Loved Ones Lost to AIDS, Crossing Press (1995)
- Cabbage and Bones: An Anthology of Irish-American Women's Fiction, Holt Paperbacks (1997)
- Touching Fire: Erotic Writings by Women, Running Press (1998)
- Queer View Mirror 2: Lesbian and Gay Short Fiction, Arsenal Pulp Press (2002)
- Queer View Mirror: Lesbian and Gay Short Fiction, Arsenal Pulp Press (2002)
