= Urban Rural Mission =

Religious outreach effort

The Urban Rural Mission is a programme of the World Council of Churches. It started with the Council's third assembly in New Delhi (1961), when concerns were raised about mission in urban and industrial societies.

In the late 1990s, URM Canada funded several activities including story-telling circles in Black Nova Scotian communities, hosted an intercultural women’s day and organized a wilderness retreat for Aboriginal youth, among other activities. It later produced a video entitled “This Is Our Story and We Live By Telling It - Storytelling as Community Development.”
