= Nicole Hollander =

American cartoonist and writer (1939–2026)

- Born: Nicole Marilyn Garrison; April 25, 1939 Chicago, Illinois, U.S.
- Died: April 23, 2026 (aged 86) Chicago, Illinois, U.S.
- Area: Cartoonist
- Notable works: We Ate Wonder Bread: A Memoir of Growing Up on the West Side of Chicago and The Sylvia Chronicles: 30 Years of Graphic Misbehavior from Reagan to Obama
- Spouse: Paul Hollander (m. 1962; div. 1966)

Nicole Marilyn Hollander (née Garrison; April 25, 1939 – April 23, 2026) was an American cartoonist and writer. Her daily comic strip Sylvia was syndicated to newspapers nationally by Tribune Media Services.

== Early life and education ==
Nicole Hollander's Sylvia from The Whole Enchilada (1982)

Born in Chicago, Illinois, on April 25, 1939, Nicole Hollander was the daughter of Shirley Mazur Garrison and Henry Garrison, a labor activist and member of the carpenters union. She was Jewish. Growing up in a working-class Chicago neighborhood, she was educated in Chicago public schools. She earned a B.F.A. from the University of Illinois at Urbana-Champaign in 1960, followed by an M.F.A. from Boston University in 1966. Her marriage to Hungarian sociologist Paul Hollander in 1962 ended in divorce, four years later.

== Career ==
During the 1970s, Hollander was the graphic designer of a feminist publication, The Spokeswoman, where she had the opportunity to transform the newsletter into a monthly magazine. While designing pages, she occasionally added her own political illustrations.

Around 1978, Hollander created a comic strip, The Feminist Funnies, later introducing the character who became Sylvia. Selections from The Feminist Funnies appeared as a calendar, Witches, Pigs and Fairy Godmothers: The 1978 Feminist Funnies Appointment Calendar, and in her 1979 book, I'm in Training to Be Tall and Blonde. The book's success led the Field Newspaper Syndicate to distribute Sylvia to newspapers as a daily comic strip starting in 1981.

In the late 1980s and early 1990s, Hollander drew comics for Mother Jones magazine. Many of these did not include the Sylvia character.

Hollander donated the archive of her work to the Billy Ireland Cartoon Library & Museum at Ohio State University. A number of her drawings are in the collection of the Library of Congress. She was a faculty member at the School of the Art Institute of Chicago, in 2011 offering a course in writing the graphic novel. She led workshops and taught at Ohio State University, Columbia College Chicago, the Ox-Bow School of Art, Chicago's Printers Row Lit Fest, and for the Chicago Arts Partnership in Education. Her frequent appearances as a public speaker since 2001 have occurred at The New School, Loyola University Chicago, DePaul University, the Art Institute of Chicago, Enoch Pratt Free Library, the Library of Congress, Stagebridge, and elsewhere. In 2009, Hollander curated a show of women's humor, And You Think This Is Funny?, for Chicago's Woman Made Gallery; the show included the work of some 50 women artists. The gallery's simultaneous ten-year retrospective exhibit of Hollander's work was titled It's Enough to Make a Cat Laugh. In 2012, Nicole Hollander's "unique collection of condom packages and sex toys" entered the collection of the Kinsey Institute for Research in Sex, Gender, and Reproduction.

In 2005, Hollander appeared in a one-woman show, Return to Lust, at Pegasus Players in Chicago. A second show, Plastic Surgery or a Real Good Haircut, opened in 2008 at Chicago's Live Bait Theatre. In these performances, she described her experiences as an aging woman dealing with physical vanity, sexual desire and an overlong birthday-party guest list. In 2013, the Lillstreet Gallery replicated Hollander's living room for an exhibit they called "Will You Step Into My Parlour?"

== Retirement and death ==
On March 26, 2012, Hollander announced that she was retiring her Sylvia strip from newspaper syndication. She planned to continue posting archival strips on her blog—"many of them, unfortunately, are as relevant now as they were then"—with occasional new strips.

Hollander died in Chicago on April 23, 2026, at the age of 86. She had dementia and respiratory issues, and resided at an assisted living facility.

== Books ==
Hollander published 19 Sylvia collections, including The Whole Enchilada (1982), Tales from the Planet Sylvia (1990), with an introduction by Barbara Ehrenreich, and The Sylvia Chronicles: 30 Years of Graphic Misbehavior from Reagan to Obama (2010), with an introduction by Jules Feiffer. She is the author of Tales of Graceful Aging from the Planet Denial (2007) and the illustrator of many books by other writers, including children's books by Robie Harris and books in praise of cats by Allia Zobel.

With Skip Morrow and Ron Wolin, Hollander edited Drawn Together: Relationships Lampooned, Harpooned, & Cartooned (Crown, 1983) for the Cartoonists Guild. Her work was included in the satirical pro-choice comic book Choices (Angry Isis Press, 1990) alongside such fellow contributors as Howard Cruse, Jules Feiffer, Bill Griffith, Cathy Guisewite, Bill Koeb, Lee Marrs, Nina Paley and Garry Trudeau. Gina Barreca and Nicole Hollander collaborated on An ABC of Vice: An Insatiable Woman's Guide (Bibliopola Press, 2003), which combines Barreca's text and Hollander's cartoons. Hollander's cartoons are featured on the covers and in the text of Getting in Touch with Your Inner Bitch (Hysteria, 1994) and The Inner Bitch: Guide to Men, Relationships, Dating, Etc. (Hysteria, 1999), by Elizabeth Hilts.

For a complete list with details, see List of works by Nicole Hollander.

=== We Ate Wonder Bread ===
In 2018, Hollander published her graphic memoir, We Ate Wonder Bread: Growing Up on Chicago's West Side (Fantagraphics Books). This project began during a residency at artist colony Ragdale. "At Ragdale, I was in a very big studio on the prairie. I got some really beautiful paper that was rough and huge, and I just it stapled to the wall and started drawing with charcoal. It was really a wonderful way to do it, because you're drawing a story, you're illustrating your childhood, but you have no idea if it's ever going to get published. So you just keep drawing and it just flows."

Cartoonist and memoirist Alison Bechdel describes We Ate Wonder Bread as "a superhero origin story", noting that the title character of Sylvia "certainly possesses powers far beyond those of mere mortals" and tracing Hollander's humor to "the raucous banter of . . . mesmerizing women". Hollander explains that "if women hadn't taken their daughters with them everywhere, I would never have heard their stories and made their language my own." Hollander has performed on stage as a memoirist, and videos of her performances appear on YouTube channel Louder Than a Mom.

== Awards ==
Hollander's work has formed the basis for several theatrical musicals, including Female Problems and Sylvia's Real Good Advice, winner of a Joseph Jefferson Award in 1991. Other awards include the Wonder Woman Foundation Award for Women of Achievement over 40 (1983) and Yale's Chubb Fellowship for Public Service (1985).

== Critical reception ==
- "Nicole Hollander has been one of our nation's leading satirists. This means she is in the business of telling the truth and making it funny... She is a radical social critic who is certain that nothing works, and so what?" (Jules Feiffer, Introduction to The Sylvia Chronicles)
- "What working commentator can confront Sylvia's range of subject matter—from macro-economics to stretch marks, from foreign policy to kitty litter—without gnawing anxiously on his or her writing instrument?... her supernatural insight into matters of public policy, her ability to see, as with x-ray vision, through the stupefying drone of media rhetoric." (Barbara Ehrenreich, Introduction to Tales from the Planet Sylvia)
- "There are precious few women cartoonists, and Nicole is the only one with a daily strip who presents the believable struggles of women in contemporary society." (Sara Paretsky)
- "Many [respondents to a reader survey] who voted for Mr. Boffo did so simply to vote against Sylvia. Several claimed they would have voted for a blank space. Their message: Get rid of Sylvia." (Providence Journal)
- "Shrewd and cynical and drily, wittily, outrageously attitudinous." (Katha Pollitt)
- "The unofficial cartoonist laureate of women's studies programs around the country... Her cartoons allow us to track the shifting landscape of right-versus-left politics that brought us to where we are now." (Audrey Bilger)
- "Sylvia...is the mother who lets you swear and talk about sex. She is the friend who advises you to hold the emerald eyeshadow until after dark. She is the sister who appreciates vasectomy humor." (Susan Swartz)
- "The comic strip equivalent of TV's Hazel." (G. J. Angelo)
- "Verbal switchblades." (Laura Mansnerus)
- "The toughest woman in America." (The Village Voice, quoted on the back cover of The Sylvia Chronicles)
- "Sylvia, the best bathtub philosopher since Marat." (Hedy Weiss)
- "The most outspokenly feminist cartoonist in mainstream publication.” (Paula Chin)
- "Sometimes I understand Sylvia, and it's beginning to scare me." (Carol Andrew)

== See also ==
- List of female comics creators
