= Susan Stinson =

American writer

Susan Stinson is an American writer. She has published four novels and a collection of poetry.

Born in Texas and raised in Colorado, she currently lives in Northampton, Massachusetts, where she is writer in residence at the Forbes Library. She is an out lesbian.

== Awards ==
Stinson was awarded the Jim Duggins Outstanding Mid-Career Novelists' Prize in 2011. Her novel Venus of Chalk was a Lambda Literary Award finalist and was named one of the ten best books of the year by Publishing Triangle, and she is a past winner of the Independent Book Publishers Association's Benjamin Franklin Award for Fiction.

== Works ==
- Belly Songs (1993)
- Fat Girl Dances with Rocks (1994, ISBN 9781883523022 )
- Martha Moody (1995, ISBN 978-1-883523-07-7)
- Venus of Chalk (2004, ISBN 978-1563411373)
- Spider in a Tree (2013, ISBN 9781618730695)
