= Minnie Bruce Pratt =

American educator, activist and essayist (1946–2023)

- Minnie Bruce Pratt, from a 1986 publication
- Born: September 12, 1946; Selma, Alabama
- Died: July 2, 2023 (aged 76); Syracuse, New York
- Education: University of Alabama (BA); University of North Carolina (PhD)
- Occupations: Professor of Writing and Women's Studies
- Employer: Syracuse University
- Spouses: Marvin E. Weaver II (m. 1966; div. 1975); Leslie Feinberg (m. 2011; died 2014)
- Partners: Joan E. Biren (1981–1992); Leslie Feinberg (1992–2011)
- Children: 2
- Writing career
- Years active: 1975–2023
- Subjects: Race, class, gender and sexual theory
- Website: mbpratt.org

Minnie Bruce Pratt (September 12, 1946 – July 2, 2023) was an American poet, educator, activist, and essayist. She retired in 2015 from her position as Professor of Writing and Women's Studies at Syracuse University where she was invited to help develop the university's first LGBT studies program.

== Early life and education ==
Pratt was born in Selma, Alabama, on September 12, 1946, and grew up in Centreville, Alabama. Her parents were Virginia Brown Pratt, a social worker, and William Luther Pratt Jr., a clerk. She graduated with a BA from the University of Alabama (1968) and earned a PhD in English literature from the University of North Carolina at Chapel Hill (1979).

== Professional career ==
During and shortly after her PhD, Pratt taught at Fayetteville State University and Shaw University, two historically Black universities. In 1977, Pratt helped to found WomanWrites, a Southeastern lesbian writers conference. While attending the University of North Carolina in 1978, she joined Feminary, a southern feminist writing collective based in Chapel Hill and Durham, North Carolina.

In 1984, she co-founded LIPS, a Washington, DC, lesbian affinity group. As the group's last public action, they participated in civil disobedience at the 1987 protest of the Bowers v. Hardwick sodomy law decision made by the U.S. Supreme Court, becoming the first group to be arrested at this protest. Her political affiliations included the International Action Center, the National Women's Fightback Network, and the National Writers Union; she also served as managing editor of the Workers World Party newspaper.

Pratt's 1984 essay entitled "Identity: Skin Blood Heart" published in the anthology Yours in Struggle is an early and exceptional example of intersectional analysis, particularly notable because Pratt wrote about racism from her perspective as a white feminist, at a time when very few white feminists were addressing racism. Julie Enszer wrote in 2023: "That essay was very popular in women’s studies circles... Reading this early essay of Pratt’s, I find many of the hallmarks of Pratt’s work: a profound commitment to feminism as an intersectional practice committed to addressing structural inequality through attention to people’s material lives."

Pratt wrote the 1990 book Crimes Against Nature, in which she described losing custody of her children because of her lesbianism. In 1991, the book won the Stonewall Book Award for Literature.

Pratt wrote extensively on race, class, gender, and sexual theory. Along with lesbian writers Chrystos and Audre Lorde, she received a 1991 Hellman/Hammett award from the Fund for Free Expression to writers "who have been victimized by political persecution".

Pratt appeared in Rosa von Praunheim's 1996 film, The Transexual Menace, named after the eponymous transgender rights organization, The Transexual Menace.

Pratt served on the faculty of the distance education school Union Institute & University.

Pratt joined Syracuse University in 2005 in the writing and women's studies departments. She helped launch the university's LGBTQ studies program in 2006. She was also an affiliated faculty member with the disability studies department and consulted on the Future of Minority Studies Project and Stone Canoe journal. She retired in 2015.

She has published several poetry collections, including S/HE (1995), a meditation on gender fluidity and identity, and Inside the Money Machine (2011), which critiques capitalism and economic oppression. Her poetry often blends lyrical beauty with political urgency, making her a voice in contemporary feminist and LGBTQ+ literature. In 2022, Pratt released Magnified, a poetry collection born out of the loss of her longtime partner, Leslie Feinberg, a trans lesbian activist and communist revolutionary.

== Personal life ==
Pratt divided her time between Syracuse, New York and Centreville, Alabama. She was the widow of author-activist Leslie Feinberg, who died in November 2014 at age 65. Feinberg and Pratt married in New York and Massachusetts in 2011.

Pratt had two sons, Ben and Ransom Weaver, by a previous marriage to poet Marvin E. Weaver II, which started while she attended college. In 1975, Pratt and her husband divorced in Fayetteville, North Carolina. She lost custody of her children because the state criminalized homosexual activity at the time.

Pratt's children, Ben and Ransom Weaver, announced in June 2023 that Pratt had been diagnosed with a "severe health problem" and was receiving palliative care. She died in Syracuse, New York, on July 2, 2023, aged 76. Her New York Times obituary specified that she had suffered from glioblastoma.

== Published works ==
- The Sound of One Fork. Durham, North Carolina: Night Heron Press. 1981. ISBN 978-0-940354-00-5.
- Elly Bulkin; Barbara Smith (1984). Yours In Struggle: Three Feminist Perspectives on Anti-Semitism and Racism. New York: Long Haul Press. ISBN 0-932379-53-2. Chosen for the 100 Best Lesbian and Gay Nonfiction Books, by the Publishing Triangle, 2004.
- Biren, Joan E.; Minnie Bruce Pratt (1987). Making a way : lesbians out front / photographs by JEB (Joan E. Biren); foreword by Minnie Bruce Pratt. Washington, D.C.: Glad Hag Books; San Francisco, California : Distributed by Spinsters/Aunt Lute. p. 112. ISBN 0960317619.
- Crime Against Nature. Ithaca, New York.: Firebrand Books. 1990. ISBN 0-932379-73-7. American Library Association Gay and Lesbian Book Award in Literature 1991, The Lamont Poetry Selection of The Academy of American Poets, 1989.
- Rebellion: Essays 1980-1991. Ithaca, New York.: Firebrand Books. 1991. ISBN 1-56341-006-0.
- We Say We Love Each Other. San Francisco: Spinster's ink books/Aunt Lute Books. 1985. ISBN 1-56341-023-0.
- S/HE. Ithaca, New York: Firebrand Books. 1995. ISBN 1-55583-888-X.
- Walking Back Up Depot Street: Poems. Pittsburgh: University of Pittsburgh Press. 1999. ISBN 0-8229-4096-5. Best Gay and Lesbian Book of the Year by ForeWord: Magazine of Independent Bookstores and Booksellers, 2000.
- The Money Machine: Selected Poems. New York: Belladonna* Books. 2003. ASIN B0006S92LE.
- The Dirt She Ate: Selected and New Poems. Pittsburgh: University of Pittsburgh Press. 2003. ISBN 0-8229-5826-0. Chosen Lambda Literary Award for Lesbian Poetry, 2003.
- Inside the Money Machine. Carolina Wren Press. 2011. ISBN 978-0-932112-60-6.
- Magnified. Wesleyan University Press. 2021. ISBN 978-0-819580-06-1.

== Honors and awards ==
- 1989 - Lamont Poetry Selection of the Academy of American Poets for Crime Against Nature
- 1990 - Creative Writing Fellowship in Poetry, from the National Endowment for the Arts
- 1991 - American Library Association Gay and Lesbian Book Award in Literature for Crime Against Nature
- 2002 - Lucille Medwick Memorial Award from the Poetry Society of America, "Picking Up a Job Application"
- 2003 - Lambda Literary Award for The Dirt She Ate
- 2005 - Fellowship in Poetry, New Jersey State Council on the Arts
- 2011 - Publishing Triangle's Audre Lorde Award for lesbian poetry for Inside the Money Machine
