= When Megan Went Away =

1979 children's book by Jane Severance

- The cover of When Megan Went Away
- Author: Jane Severance
- Illustrator: Tea Schook
- Language: English
- Genre: Children's picture book
- Publisher: Lollipop Power
- Publication date: 1979
- Publication place: United States
- Media type: Paperback
- Pages: 32
- ISBN: 9780914996224
- OCLC: 6734819

When Megan Went Away is a 1979 children's picture book written by Jane Severance and illustrated by Tea Schook. It is the first picture book to include any LGBT characters, and specifically the first to feature lesbian characters, a distinction sometimes erroneously bestowed upon Lesléa Newman's Heather Has Two Mommies (1989). The book, published by the independent press Lollipop Power, depicts a child named Shannon dealing with the separation of her mother and her mother's partner, Megan.

As a lesbian working in a feminist bookstore in Denver in her early twenties, Severance sought to rectify the lack of picture book content for children with lesbian parents. When Megan Went Away was not widely distributed upon publication, although the text of the story was republished by the magazine Ms. in 1986 under the pen name R. Minta Day. The work proved divisive among critics, some praising the story for being an anti-sexist example of lesbian life and others finding its depiction of same-sex separation poorly timed, arriving at a moment when lesbian motherhood was on the rise. Copies of When Megan Went Away were primarily accessible in archives and library special collections as of the 2010s.

== Background ==
Jane Severance was born in Moscow, Idaho, in 1957. She recalled attempting to write stories when she was seven years old, having "always wanted to be a writer". Despite a familial fondness for reading, Severance felt that she did not receive much encouragement from her family to pursue writing as a profession.

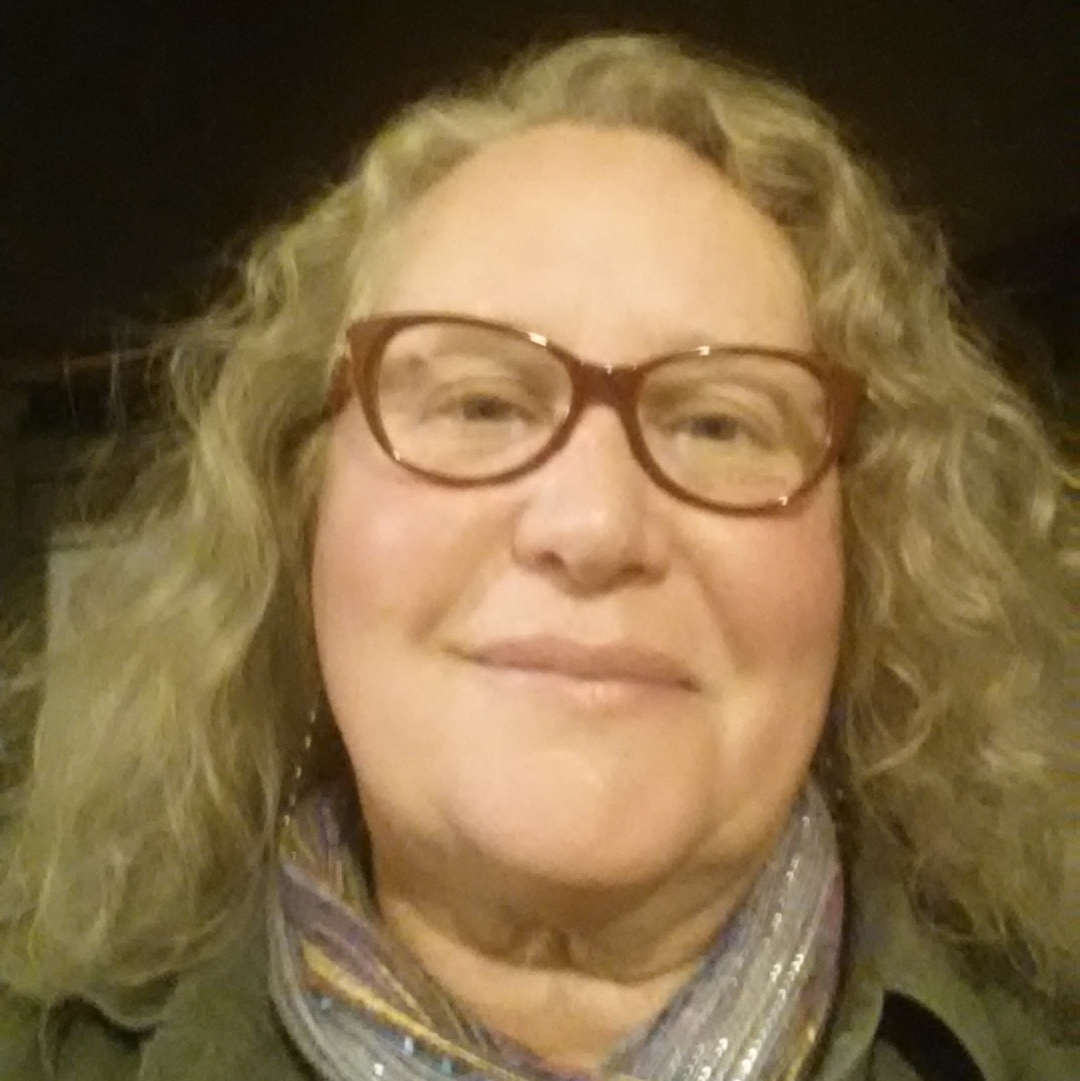
Severance in 2015

Severance came out as a lesbian and moved to Denver to study early childhood education in college; she finished school after a decade and was teaching preschool by the late 1970s. In Denver, she became involved with what she characterized as "a very small subset of the lesbian community ... the very young lesbian feminists". The community organized protests and marches and ran a production company, a newspaper, and the feminist bookstore Woman to Woman. She observed among her peers "some pretty wretched parenting", noting that the lack of older lesbian role models, compounded by a dearth of parenting education, widespread poverty, mental illness, and substance abuse all contributed to the difficulties that members of her community faced. None of the lesbian mothers Severance knew had planned children with their female partners, most of their children having instead come from the mothers' past relationships with men. Severance identified a need for picture book content about children with lesbian mothers like those in her community. She also noted a contemporary trend of children's books dealing with divorce and decided to "kill two birds with one stone" in writing When Megan Went Away, addressing lesbian motherhood and parental separation.

== Plot ==
When Megan Went Away depicts Shannon, a preteen girl whose unnamed mother has recently separated from her partner, Megan. At the beginning of the story, Shannon wanders through her house, noticing items Megan has taken with her, as well as items that remain that remind her of Megan. Shannon reminisces about what life was like before the separation. Both Shannon and her mother are distraught about the breakup.

Shannon pulls out a jigsaw puzzle but remembers that her mother does not enjoy them. She makes a dinner of sandwiches and milk for her mother and herself, and becomes upset when her mother fails to eat the meal. Built-up anger and sadness lead Shannon to throw a tantrum in the living room, where her mother comes to comfort her. In the darkness, the two cuddle beneath a blanket and reflect on good and bad times they shared with Megan. Exhausted after crying together, Shannon and her mother make their way to the kitchen, where her mother prepares them both hamburgers. The story ends with Shannon's mother telling her to grab a puzzle to complete together.

== Publication history ==
Severance wrote When Megan Went Away when she was around 21 years old. She described feeling that the publication process was completely foreign to her. Severance submitted her manuscript to Lollipop Power, a Chapel Hill, North Carolina–based independent press whose address she found listed on the back of their books. Lollipop Power, founded in 1970, was devoted to publishing works that sought to lessen gender stereotypes and gendered behavior in young children. During the editing process, against Severance's wishes, the publisher rewrote a section of the book. Lollipop Power also suggested that she change the names "Shannon" and "Megan", lest readers get the impression that "only women with Irish heritage were lesbians". (Note: The name "Megan" is Welsh in origin.)

The book When Megan Went Away was published in 1979 as a 32-page paperback illustrated by Tea Schook. The book's pages and its covers were all printed on paper and bound with staples. Recommended for readers aged 5–12 years, the book was not widely distributed upon its printing. The text was reprinted in 1986 in the magazine Ms. without Schook's illustrations. The story was run under the pen name R. Minta Day and published as part of the Stories for Free Children feature, a regular section consisting of anti-sexist, anti-racist fiction for children. Despite Severance's text appearing in Ms., Lesléa Newman, a fellow LGBT children's author, said that Lollipop Power did not do enough publicity for the book, limiting its potential readership. In 2023 after a successful crowdfunding campaign, the book was also republished in Korean.

== Reception ==
When Megan Went Away received no coverage from major book review magazines upon its release but was reviewed in several niche publications. Lenore Gordon praised the story in the Interracial Books for Children Bulletin in 1980, writing that its strength lies "both in [Severance's] gentle storytelling voice and her use of detail". Carrie Dearborn wrote in Gay Community News that the book had an emotional impact on her and her friends. She described the work as "one that will help the child of a lesbian feel less alone", praising the decorations in Schook's art as "Early American Dyke". Gordon described Schook's illustrations as having "a pleasurable child-quality" to them, which she found to be tonally inconsistent with Severance's somber text. Carolyn Moskovitz described the story in the WLW Journal as "a bit downbeat".

Writing in 1989, the English professor Virginia L. Wolf suggested that the romantic nature of the relationship between Shannon's mother and Megan might not be recognized by child readers, but that some adult readers would likely understand the story's lesbian context. In 2022, the English scholar Jennifer Miller described the work as resistant to normative readings that might be belied by its simple cover art of a mother soothing her daughter, the text "showing an emotionally complex mother-child relationship that includes various instances in which the child attempts to nurture the mother".

While praising its attempts to depict an anti-sexist family, Gordon criticized When Megan Went Away for presenting "an uncommonly liberated lesbian lifestyle", which she viewed as minimizing the relevance of the book to a wider array of readers. Although the depiction of a same-sex parented household satisfied some readers, others were concerned that the first story published about the topic revolved around a broken relationship. According to the multicultural elementary education scholar Danné E. Davis, the timing of the book's publication received criticism from some contemporary lesbians and feminists, who viewed the separation narrative of When Megan Went Away as detrimental to public perception of lesbian households at a time when lesbian motherhood was beginning to increase. When writing the story, Severance was intent on depicting shared concerns like parental separation among lesbian and nonlesbian families.

== Legacy ==
Before the late 1970s, several picture books with gender-nonconforming characters existed, but there were otherwise no LGBT characters within the medium of children's picture books. Scholars of children's literature generally consider When Megan Went Away to be the first published picture book to include any LGBT characters, as well as the first specifically to feature lesbian characters and the first to depict separation in a same-gender relationship. Though the text of the story never uses the word "lesbian" to explicitly identify the characters, the word is used paratextually in Severance and Schook's dedication at the beginning of the book: "This story is for all children of lesbian mothers, for the special hardships they may face, and for the understanding we hope they will reach." As of 2022, When Megan Went Away remained just one of two documented children's picture books featuring LGBT characters to depict divorce or separation. (Note: The other is Lesléa Newman's Saturday Is Pattyday (1993).)

When Megan Went Away is sometimes forgotten as the first picture book to feature lesbian characters, a distinction instead given to Lesléa Newman's Heather Has Two Mommies (1989). For a time, the website of Alyson Books, publisher of Heather Has Two Mommies, (Note: Heather was originally independently published before being published by Alyson.) listed Heather as the first lesbian picture book.

Though Newman originally said Heather was the first lesbian picture book, she later acknowledged that When Megan Went Away preceded her work. Newman describes her book as "the first picture book that portrays a happy family that consists of two lesbian moms and their child". Severance has expressed the desire that Newman identify Heather as "the first successful book about lesbian mothers", citing the work's success and notoriety. Both Severance and Newman, who are personally acquainted, agreed that intangible factors like timing and luck likely contributed to the relative popularity of Heather. Severance also described Newman as "a hustler" who "knew how to run with" her book's popularity. Newman stated that she believed Lollipop Power did a poor job of marketing When Megan Went Away upon its publication. Despite its early treatment of lesbian characters, When Megan Went Away is not known by scholars of children's literature to have attracted any challenges or ban attempts like Heather and other later picture books featuring LGBT characters faced. In contrasting the ways in which Heather and When Megan Went Away were received, Davis wrote that both books were perhaps "too early for their time".

Since When Megan Went Away was published, Severance has written two more books: Lots of Mommies (1983), a picture book about a girl raised by four mothers, and Ghost Pains (1992), a young adult novel about two sisters living with an alcoholic lesbian mother. The children's literature researcher Thomas Crisp noted in the Children's Literature Association Quarterly that Severance's books contribute a unique depiction of queer life within children's literature, a "vision that may be more emotionally honest" than other portrayals. As of 2010, Severance was continuing to write and was searching for an agent in order to publish other works for a larger audience. Crisp also reported that copies of When Megan Went Away were difficult to find in 2010. The book's availability is primarily limited to library special collections and archives, and when secondary sales of the work do occur online, copies may be listed for over 40 times the original retail price of $1.85.

== See also ==
- Jenny Lives with Eric and Martin (1981, published in English in 1983), the first picture book to include gay male characters
- 10,000 Dresses (2008), the first picture book to feature a transgender character
