= Sara M. Evans =

American historian (born 1943)

- Born: Sara Margaret Evans; December 1, 1943 (age 82); McCormick, South Carolina, U.S.
- Other name: Sara Evans Boyte
- Education: Duke University (B.A. 1966, M.A. 1968); University of North Carolina at Chapel Hill (Ph.D 1976)
- Occupation: Historian
- Spouse: Harry C. Boyte (m. 1966, divorced)
- Children: 2

Sara Margaret Evans (born December 1, 1943) is an American historian and author. Evans is a Regents Professor Emeritus in the history department at the University of Minnesota. She has also worked as the editor of Feminist Studies and a consulting editor of the Journal of American History. She received her B.A. in 1966 and her M.A. in 1968, both from Duke University. She later received her PhD from the University of North Carolina at Chapel Hill in 1976 and began teaching at the University of Minnesota that year.

== Personal life ==
Evans was born on December 1, 1943, in McCormick, South Carolina. Her father was a Methodist minister; she described her mother as "a radical egalitarian in her bones."

Evans and the writer Harry C. Boyte were wed on June 5, 1966. She took the married name Sara Evans Boyte for several years, including for the publication of her children's picture book Jenny's Secret Place (1970), the first book printed by Lollipop Power. However, she reverted to her maiden name in 1974 before publishing her dissertation "because," she said, "I was married to a published writer and I wanted what I wrote to be mine and to stand on its own." Together, Evans and Boyte co-wrote the book Free Spaces: Sources of Democratic Change in America (1986). They had two children and divorced in 1994.

== Books ==
- Personal Politics: The Roots of Women's Liberation in the Civil Rights Movement and the New Left (1979)
- Free Spaces: Sources of Democratic Change in America (1986; 1992 2nd ed.), with Harry C. Boyte
- Born for Liberty: A History of American Women (1989)
- Wage Justice: Comparable Worth and the Paradox of Technocratic Reform (1989) with Barbara J. Nelson
- Journeys That Opened Up the World: Women, Student Christian Movements, and Social Justice, 1955–1975 (2003)
- Tidal Wave: How Women Changed America at Century's End (2003)

== Awards ==
Her awards include:

- CLA Dean's Medal, 1999
- College of Liberal Arts Scholars of the College, University of Minnesota, 1991 - 1994
- McKnight Humanities Scholar, University of Minnesota, 1996 - 1999
- McKnight Distinguished University Professorship, beginning in 1997
- College of Liberal Arts Dean's Medal, University of Minnesota, 1999
- President's Outstanding Service Award, University of Minnesota, 1999
- American Council of Learned Societies Fellowship, 2001 - 2002
- Award for Outstanding Contributions to Postbaccalaureate, Graduate, and Professional Education, 2002 - 2003
- Regents' Professorship, University of Minnesota, 2004

== Papers ==
The Sara M. Evans Papers, 1959-2005, are held at the David M. Rubenstein Rare Book & Manuscript Library.
