= Jane Severance =

American children's author (born 1957)

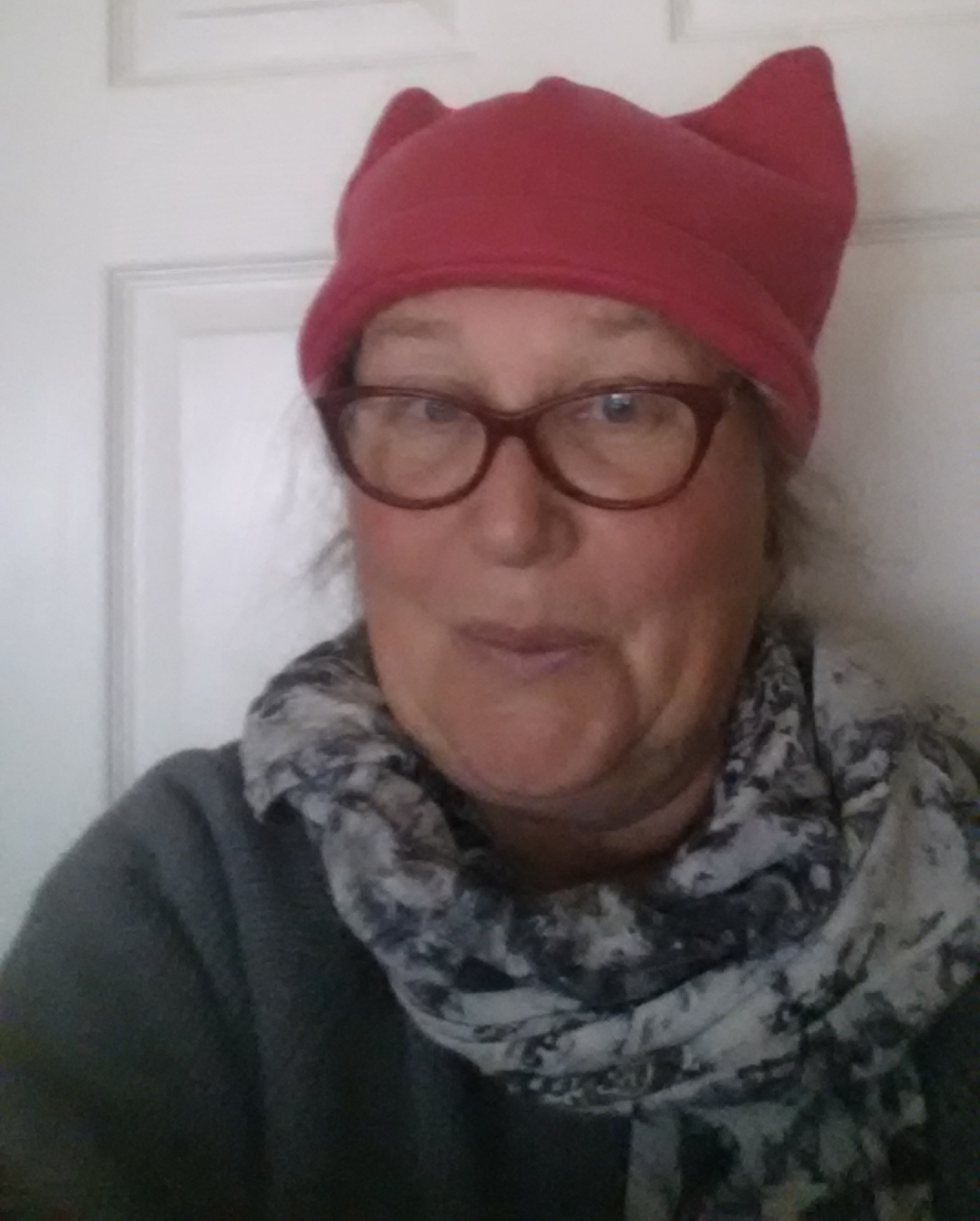
- Severance in 2017
- Born: 1957 (age 68–69); Moscow, Idaho, U.S.
- Occupations: Writer, educator
- Writing career
- Years active: 1979–present
- Notable work: When Megan Went Away (1979)

Jane Severance (born 1957) is an American author of children's literature and an educator. She has published three books for young readers, including her first work, When Megan Went Away (1979), the first children's picture book to include LGBT characters.

Severance grew up in Idaho before coming out as a lesbian and moving to Denver to study early childhood education. There, she became involved with the local lesbian feminist community. Her works, all of which include lesbian characters, deal with parental separation (When Megan Went Away), non-nuclear communal parenting (Lots of Mommies, 1983), and parental alcoholism (Ghost Pains, 1992). Scholars of children's literature have described Severance's works as unique and honest portrayals of lesbian life that differ in tone from the portrayals in many other picture books with LGBT characters.

== Early life ==
Jane Severance was born in Moscow, Idaho, in 1957. Much of her extended family also lived in the state. Severance's father was an electrical engineer who described himself as a "farmer-mechanic" and "farmer-carpenter". Severance felt she learned to be crafty and resourceful from him, and later became an avid seamstress. Her mother dealt with alcohol and prescription drug abuse throughout Severance's childhood. In spite of this, she described her youth as idyllic, growing up in a family (including two grandparents and an aunt) who valued reading. In Severance's early life, her father took work at Los Alamos National Laboratory in New Mexico, so her family relocated there for a time. Later, they returned to Idaho and Severance joined the Girl Scouts.

Severance began writing stories at age seven. Since she did not receive much support from her family to pursue writing professionally, she instead decided to study early childhood education. She came out as a lesbian and moved to Denver for college. Severance's conservative uncles shunned her when she came out, but her father accepted her. Around this time, when Severance turned 20, her mother became sober and "has been very supportive since". In Denver, Severance got involved with the local lesbian feminist community. She and her peers ran a bookstore called Woman to Woman, a production company called Virago, and a newspaper called the Big Mama Rag.

== Career ==
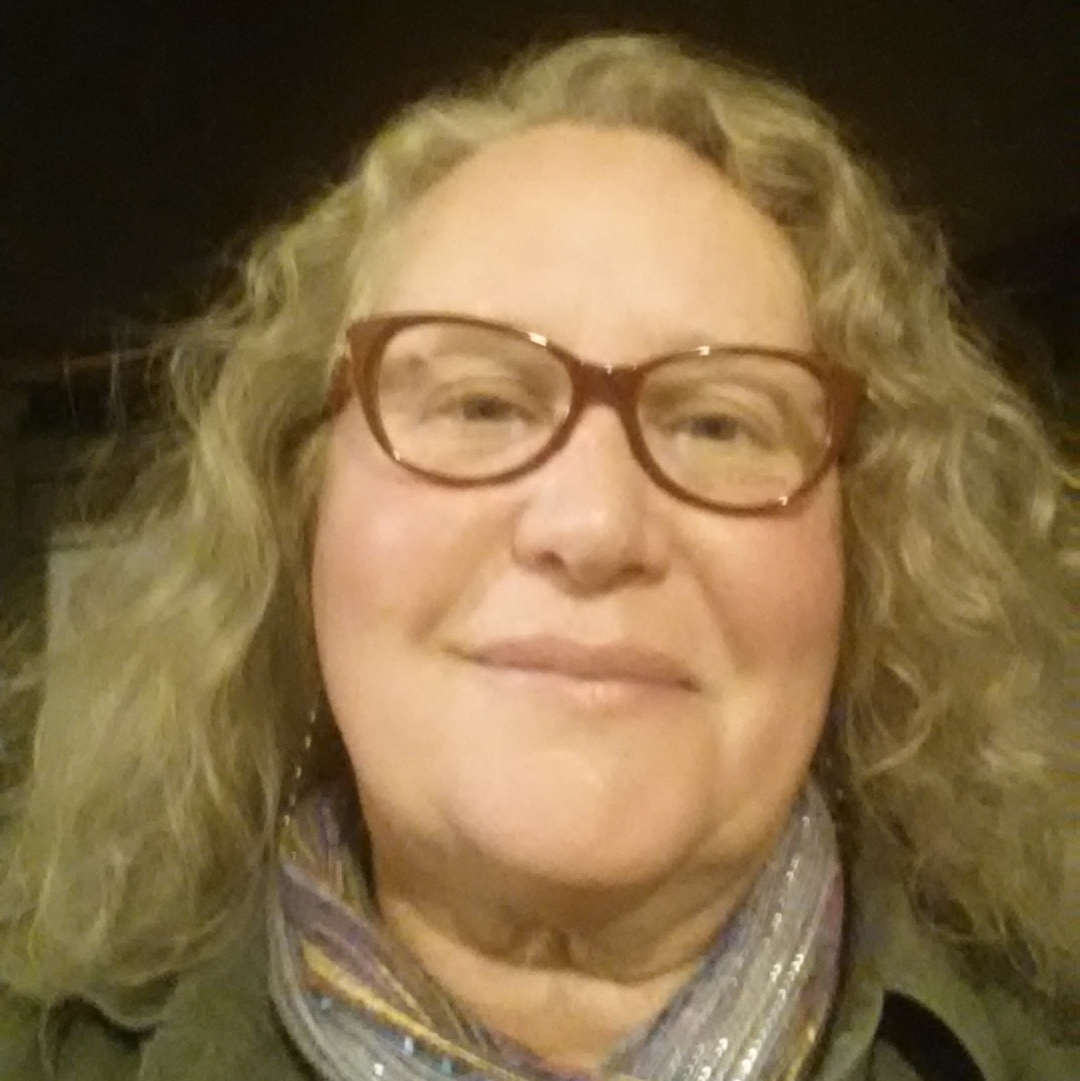
Severance in 2015

While working at Woman to Woman around age 21, Severance encountered picture books published by the Chapel Hill, North Carolina–based independent press Lollipop Power and felt like she could write a work of similar quality about lesbian life. Severance said that she observed "some pretty wretched parenting" among the single mothers in her Denver lesbian community and sought to write a work that would "kill two birds with one stone": depicting lesbian communities and depicting the separation of a parent and their partner. She sent the manuscript for the book, When Megan Went Away, to Lollipop Power, and after a somewhat contentious editing process, the work was published in 1979 with illustrations by Tea Schook.

The book was the first children's picture book to depict any LGBT characters, and specifically the first to depict lesbian characters. Severance stated that she has "gotten a lot of flack" for depicting "a lesbian family in a 'negative' way" (dealing with a parental separation). The depiction came at a time in U.S. history when lesbian motherhood was increasing, and, as the children's literature scholar Danné Davis, wrote, "When Megan Went Away did little to endorse solid dual-mom relationships and lesbian partnered headed households", thus drawing ire for the work.

Severance's second picture book, Lots of Mommies, was published by Lollipop Power in 1983 with illustrations by Jan Jones. The work tells the story of a girl whose classmates doubt she has four mothers, but she is proven correct when all four rush to her aid when she is injured on the school playground. Severance drew inspiration for the work from children she knew in Denver who were being raised in collective households. Some scholars consider the work to be another early picture book depiction of lesbian life, while others contest this as the mothers' relationships to one another is not established by the text. For her part, Severance considers the work to depict lesbian characters.

Severance's third book was a young adult (YA) novel called Ghost Pains about two daughters of a lesbian mother who is dealing with alcoholism. Severance drew inspiration from her own relationship with her mother for the work, which she described as being autobiographical; however, she also wanted to write a work in which the character's lesbianism was incidental rather than focal. The book was published in 1992 by London-based Sheba Feminist Press.

Since publishing Ghost Pains, Severance has continued to write. She authored a queer coming-of-age YA novel called Steal Away that has not been published, and as of 2009 she was seeking literary representation. In addition to writing, Severance also worked at the Michigan Womyn's Music Festival for six years, ran an afterschool program, and worked as a substitute teacher. Although licensed to teach, Severance said "teaching is more than a full-time job and I always wanted to have time to write."

== Legacy ==
This distinction of the first picture book with lesbian characters has sometimes erroneously been bestowed upon Lesléa Newman's Heather Has Two Mommies which was not published until 1989 – ten years after When Megan Went Away. Although the text of When Megan Went Away was republished in the magazine Ms. in 1986 under a pen name, Newman stated that she felt Lollipop Power did not publicize or distribute Severance's book very broadly, contributing to the misperception. Severance, who knows Newman, called the misconception "an honest mistake" and wrote that Newman "happened to print something in the right place at the right time and knew how to run with it". Newman changed how she described Heather Has Two Mommies to be "the first picture book that portrays a happy family that consists of two lesbian moms and their child".

The children's literature scholar Thomas Crisp described Severance's books as emerging at a time when the expectation that queer people were dysfunctional may have also been what allowed them to reach publication, as they depict often dysfunctional queer people or families. For this reason, in comparison to later children's books which tend to feature positive and celebratory depictions of LGBT people, Crisp wrote that "Severance's career and books provide an alternative look at queer life and themes in children's literature, a vision that may be more emotionally honest." Jennifer Miller, another scholar of children's literature, called Severance's two picture books "a rare snapshot into lesbian living and loving in the 1970s and 1980s. Both picture books also offer an affirming alternative to the nuclear family."

== Bibliography ==
- Severance, Jane (1979). When Megan Went Away. Illustrated by Tea Schook. Lollipop Power. ISBN 0-914996-22-3.

- Republished as Day, R. Minta (November 1986). "When Megan went away". Ms. Vol. 15, no. 5. pp. 85–86. ISSN 0047-8318.

- — (1983). Lots of Mommies. Illustrated by Jan Jones. Lollipop Power. ISBN 0-914996-24-X.
- — (1992). Ghost Pains. Sheba Feminist Press. ISBN 0-907179-45-2.
