= Lollipop Power =

American children's book publisher (1969 or 1970–1986)

- Logo as of 1973
- Status: Defunct; nominal imprint of Carolina Wren Press until c. 2009
- Founded: 1969 or 1970
- Defunct: 1986
- Country of origin: United States
- Headquarters location: Chapel Hill, North Carolina
- Publication types: Children's books
- No. of employees: 10 (1976)

Lollipop Power, Inc. was a nonprofit American independent publisher of children's books. Based in Chapel Hill, North Carolina, the group emerged from a culture of feminist organizing as an outgrowth of a discussion group in 1969 or 1970. Operating as a publishing collective of a rotating cohort of around 10 members, the press published non-sexist, non-racist picture books for children to counter depictions of gender-stereotyped roles in mainstream children's books.

The press grew until 1975, when it got its own office but sales began to plateau. At its peak, the press sold about 1,500 books monthly. A changing publishing landscape contributed to the eventual closure of the press in 1986, when it became a nominal imprint of nearby Carolina Wren Press. The press published some of the earliest picture books with explicitly queer characters, shaping the early history of the field of LGBTQ children's literature.

== History ==
Lollipop Power, Inc. emerged from a culture of liberal feminist organizing and independent publishing in the U.S. state of North Carolina at the end of the 1960s. Within this context, Sara Evans and Paula Goldsmid cofounded what Evans described as the first women's liberation group in North Carolina, Group 22, in 1968. Based in Chapel Hill, Group 22's membership was engaged with feminist consciousness raising, especially around questions of childhood socialization, as many members were new parents or would soon become parents. Seeking an active outlet for their concerns, Group 22 developed into an independent nonprofit publishing collective, Lollipop Power, in 1969 or 1970. Its founding collective included publisher Judy Hogan, who would also found Carolina Wren Press in the state in 1976.

Lollipop Power's mission was to publish children's books with non-sexist and non-racist stories. The publishing collective sought to do this to offer an alternative to the predominantly white and male stories being told in mainstream children's literature, believing that "sex stereotypes can and should be eliminated at a very early age". Members operated the publisher without significant professional publishing experience; stories were accepted both from press members and outside submissions. Lollipop Power members selected illustrators for the books based on illustrations they submitted for sample passages from the texts, with final approval of the books given to the press's board to vote upon. Authors and illustrators were not paid as of 1972, with only the member handling mail distribution of the works receiving financial compensation. By 1976, most of the collective's 10 members (none of whom were the founding members by that time) were able to pay themselves around or slightly above minimum wage.

Kathi Gallagher of the press wrote in 1982 that the founding collective envisioned the publisher as a platform to assist other feminists who desired books without stereotyped gender roles, but orders from other sources like schools, libraries, and bookstores quickly forced the collective to change their model. Its first book, Jenny's Secret Place (1970), was delayed due to lack of funds; once it was published, the company was "swamped with orders". As the company grew into the mid-1970s, it became responsible for all aspects of its publishing process including design, typesetting, and printing. The press reported annual increases in sales through 1975, when its monthly sales averaged 1,500 books. That year, the press began to work out of an office with a printer of its own; before that, "chaos reigned. Books were stored under beds, in attics, under ping-pong tables."

After 1976, sales of Lollipop Power books plateaued and then declined as the group began to release fewer works each year (including none in 1978). Gallagher wrote that an uptake in less gender-stereotyped works from larger commercial publishers like Macmillan Publishers and McGraw Hill may have contributed to the shift, but so too may have the public perception that the mid-1970s interest in non-sexist, non-racist children's literature was a fad or "one battle that had been irrevocably won". The press ceased operations in 1986, with its titles moved to Hogan's Carolina Wren Press. It published at least one more title, Phyllis Hacken Johnson's The Boy Toy, in 1988 as an imprint of Carolina Wren Press. It was listed as an active imprint as late as 2012, though Carolina Wren Press stopped seeking children's book submissions in 2009.

== Legacy ==
Lollipop Power published Jane Severance's When Megan Went Away (1979) and Lots of Mommies (1983), among the first picture books to depict explicitly queer characters. The publisher also released several other books dealing with gender-nonconforming characters, like Bruce Mack's Jesse's Dream Skirt (1979) – the first picture book about a boy who wants to wear a skirt to school – and Hacken Johnson's The Boy Toy (1988). Because so few presses in the 1970s and 1980s were publishing children's literature with queer characters, the press shaped the earliest history of LGBTQ children's literature. However, the press's limited distribution meant that its works were not widely available. In 1979, it was one of just seven independent presses of children's literature in the U.S., and the only one located in the Southeastern United States.

== Bibliography ==
Lollipop Power published 20 picture books during its existence; two further titles were printed by Carolina Wren Press under the Lollipop Power imprint after Lollipop Power's closure in 1986. Beginning in 1972, Lollipop Power also issued an annual Bibliography of Materials on Sexism and Sex-Role Stereotyping in Children's Books that highlighted non-sexist and non-racist children's literature, toys, and educational tools from a variety of publishers and sellers.

Lollipop Power publications
Year	Title	Author	Illustrator	Notes	Ref.
1970	Jenny's Secret Place	Sara Evans Boyte	Carol Jean Harkey	First publication.	
1971	Did You Ever?	Paula Goldsmid	Janice Schopler		
1971	Martin's Father	Margrit Eichler	Margrit Bev		
1972	Exactly Like Me	Lynn Phillips	Lynn Phillips		
1972	Joshua's Day	Sandra Lucas Surowiecki	Patricia Riley Lenthall		
1972	The Sheep Book	Carmen Goodyear	Carmen Goodyear		
1973	Carlotta and the Scientist	Patricia Riley Lenthall	Patricia Riley Lenthall		
1973	Grownups Cry Too	Nancy Hazen	Nancy Hazen		
1973	Jo, Flo and Yolanda	Carol De Poix	Stephanie Sove Ney		
1973	The Magic Hat	Kim Westsmith Chapman	Kitty Riley Clark		
1975	Just Momma and Me	Christine Engla Eber	Christine Engla Eber		
1975	Amy and the Cloud Basket	Ellen Pratt	Lisa Russell		
1976	The Lost Bellybutton	Margaret Morganroth Gullette	Leslie Udry		
1977	The Clever Princess	Ann Tompert	Patricia Riley		
1979	When Megan Went Away	Jane Severance	Tea Schook		
1979	Jesse's Dream Skirt	Bruce Mack	Marian Buchanan		
1979	María Teresa	Mary Atkinson	Christine Engla Eber		
1981	In Christina's Toolbox	Dianne Homan	Mary Heine		
1981	I Like You to Make Jokes with Me, but I Don't Want You to Touch Me	Ellen Bass	Marti Betz		
1983	Lots of Mommies	Jane Severance	Jan Jones		
1988	The Boy Toy	Phyllis Hacken Johnson	Lena Shiffman	Published as an imprint of Carolina Wren Press.	
1996	Puzzles	Dava Walker	Cornelius Van Wright and Ying-Hwa Hu	Published as an imprint of Carolina Wren Press.	
