= Dares to Speak =

1997 book

- Author: Joseph Geraci
- Genre: Nonfiction
- Publisher: Gay Men's Press
- Publication date: 1997
- Pages: 283
- ISBN: 9780854492411

Dares to Speak: Historical and Contemporary Perspectives on Boy Love is a 1997 book edited by Joseph Geraci and published by Gay Men's Press. The book examines the dynamics of child sexual abuse and the historical aspects of homosexual interactions between men and boys.
