= Gay Men's Press =

British publisher

- Status: Defunct
- Founded: 1979
- Country of origin: United Kingdom
- Headquarters location: London, England
- Publication types: Books
- Nonfiction topics: Gay men's literature
- Official website: www.gmppubs.co.uk

Gay Men's Press was a publisher of books based in London, United Kingdom. Founded in 1979, the imprint was run until 2000 by its founders, then until 2006 by Millivres Prowler.

== Overview ==
Launched in 1979 by Aubrey Walter, David Fernbach, and Richard Dipple, GMP, as it became known, was a pioneer publisher for the gay community, releasing at least 300 titles. The book business had been unwelcoming to LGBT writers, publishing only those works of a homosexual nature deemed suitable for mainstream readers. Authors such as David Rees, Tom Wakefield, and Mike Seabrook could now reach an audience with fiction about contemporary gay life. Gay Men's Press also published a range of non-fiction books, including acclaimed titles such as Homosexuality in Renaissance England by Alan Bray and Mother Clap's Molly House by Rictor Norton, as well as meeting the AIDS epidemic of the 1980s with a number of self-help books. Its Gay Modern Classics series provided a format for reissuing many earlier works by homosexual authors, and a Gay Verse series was made possible by a grant from the Greater London Council (before its abolition by Margaret Thatcher). Art and photography was a regular part of the list, later separated out as Editions Aubrey Walter.

In 1983 Gay Men's Press published the children's book Jenny Lives with Eric and Martin. This prompted the introduction of the Section 28 of the Local Government Act 1988, which forbade the "promotion of homosexuality" by local government, after the Daily Mail, a tabloid newspaper, reported that a copy of the book was provided in the library of a school run by the left-wing, Labour-controlled Inner London Education Authority. In 1997, the publication published Dares to Speak.

With the death of Richard Dipple in 1991, and increasing mainstream competition, GMP experienced financial problems, leading to the Gay Men's Press imprint being transferred in 2000 to Millivres Prowler, who closed the list in 2006 because of dwindling sales, caused in part by a lack of exposure in the big chain bookstores.

Valancourt Books, an independent American publishing house founded in 2005, has reprinted many works last reissued in the 1980s in GMP's Gay Modern Classics series.
