= Jenny Lives with Eric and Martin =

1981 picture book

- Author: Susanne Bösche
- Original title: Mette bor hos Morten og Erik
- Language: Danish (1981); English (1983)
- Genre: Children's picture book
- Publication place: Denmark
- Media type: Print
- ISBN: 0-907040-22-5

Jenny Lives with Eric and Martin, originally Mette bor hos Morten og Erik, is a black-and-white picture book by the Danish author Susanne Bösche, published in 1981 in Danish and in 1983 by Gay Men's Press. It was perhaps the first English-language children's book to discuss male homosexuality. Jane Severance's When Megan Went Away (1979) preceded Jenny Lives with Eric and Martin.

== Plot ==
The story describes a few days in the life of a five-year-old named Jenny, her father, Martin, and his boyfriend Eric who lives with them. Jenny's mother Karen lives nearby and often visits the household.

The book covers such small adventures as

- Jenny, Eric and Martin going to the laundrette together
- Jenny, Martin and Karen preparing a surprise birthday party for Eric
- Eric and Martin having a small quarrel and making up
- A woman expressing homophobic disgust when passing the family in the street. This is the subject of a later discussion between Eric and Jenny.

== Purpose ==
Bösche has spoken of her motivation in writing the book:

I wrote Jenny Lives with Eric and Martin back in 1981 because I became aware of the problems which some children face when meeting family groupings different from the ones they are familiar with, i.e. mum and dad, possibly mum and dad divorced, maybe a step-parent.

Bosche asserts that she had no idea her book would stir up such controversy. She said that "I didn't know people would have that negative reaction. It was very sad what happened at that time." Also, the book was originally published in Denmark and there was no backlash against it there. Despite these intentions, the book has been categorized as "homosexual propaganda" by the tabloid press in the UK, which has led to much of its influence and even notoriety.

== Political influence ==
In 1986 various newspapers reported that a copy of the book was provided in the library of a school run by the Labour-controlled Inner London Education Authority (ILEA). A complaint was made to the Press Council regarding the press coverage as the book had not actually been made available to children, but only one copy had been purchased and made available to teachers through the Isledon Teachers Centre. The Education Authority had not approved it for younger children, and it was only supposed to be shown to older children "in exceptional circumstances" and following consultation with parents.

The availability of the book was condemned by Kenneth Baker, the Secretary of State for Education. In response to Baker's intervention, Frances Morrell, the leader of ILEA, said that the very limited use of the book in local authority schools was consistent with the government's requirements on sex education.

The resulting controversy made a major contribution towards the then Conservative administration's subsequent passing of the controversial Section 28 of the Local Government Act 1988. Literary scholar Lian Beveridge argues that the controversy over Jenny Lives with Eric and Martin became part of a wider debate about the legitimacy of same-sex-parent families and children's exposure to representations of homosexuality. She notes that the book was invoked during political debates surrounding Section 28, which prohibited local authorities from promoting homosexuality or presenting homosexuality as a “pretended family relationship.”This conservative backlash was partially motivated by a wave of homophobia in Britain that had been spurred on by the public's growing fear of HIV/AIDS. Much of the conservative outrage against the book stemmed from issues that conservatives had with the photos used to illustrate the book. These were photos of Bosche's daughter with two of her friends who lived in the same building.

In the United States in the 1990s, Heather Has Two Mommies became a similarly politicised book.

== Reception ==
In a 1988 article for Index on Censorship, Adam Mars-Jones argued that the political controversy in the UK surrounding Jenny Lives with Eric and Martin had largely displaced discussion of the book itself. He noted that much of the British public knew little about the work and a negative perception occurred as consequence of a reductive understanding in the media. Mars-Jones also reported that the original Danish edition was positively received by the newspaper Politiken.

Scholar Lian Beveridge places Jenny Lives with Eric and Martin within a broader category of picture books depicting children with same-sex parents. Beveridge argues that controversies surrounding such books often reflect societal concerns about threats to “childhood innocence”, perceived challenges to heterosexuality, and questioning of the normative definitions of family, describing the reactions to these texts as forms of “moral panic”.

Miroslav Jindra identifies homosexual parenthood as one of three recurring themes in children's literature addressing homosexuality, alongside coming out and the lives of homosexual people. He traces the emergence of these themes to the 1980s, when authors increasingly introduced young readers to previously taboo subjects and portrayed homosexual people as ordinary men and women living everyday lives.
