= Big Mama Rag =

Alternative feminist newspaper (1972-1984)

- "A feminist news journal."
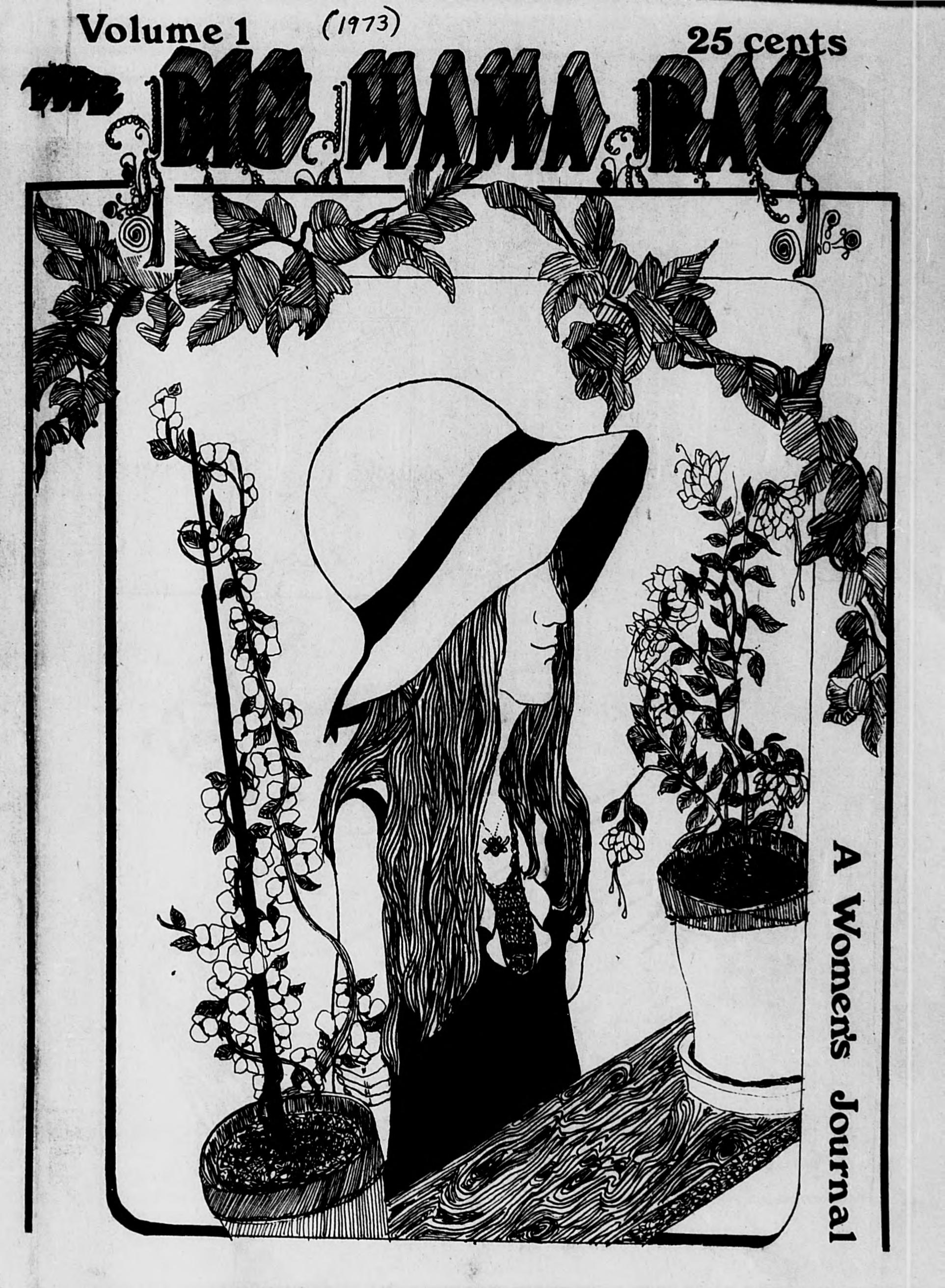
- The first issue of BMR (1973)
- Format: monthly print newspaper
- Founded: October 1972
- Ceased publication: April 1984
- Language: English
- Headquarters: Denver, Colorado
- City: Denver, Colorado
- ISSN: 0277-7533
- OCLC number: 23201144

Big Mama Rag was a radical feminist collective alternative newspaper published monthly from Denver, Colorado, between 1972 and 1984.

== History ==
Big Mama Rag was developed by a collective of feminists that recognized issues with traditional media outlets. The newspaper published eleven issues per year.

Vicki Piotter, Peg Rapp, and Kay Young opened Women to Women Feminist Book Center in Denver in 1974, where many of the young feminists collected. During this time, Piotter was involved with Big Mama Rag. Other members included Chocolate Waters, Jackie St. Joan, Jane Severance, and Kathleen Riley.

Big Mama Rag was part of the Liberation News Service.

One of the original funders of the newspaper was Denver's Aton Foundation. Big Mama Rag requested additional funds from the Denver Sustaining Fund, but was rejected. The original collective were paid by an association of methodist women, but the grant eventually ran out.

The original founders formed a "core group," which was open to anyone willing to meet twice a week and commit to the work. Most staffers were volunteers, with one paid staff member who had administrative responsibilities. They changed the name from "core group" to "collective" in order to remove the hierarchy associated with the term.

In 1975, the BMR offices were vandalized. This compounded the newspaper's financial troubles. They saw this as a "deliberate political attack," where advertising and mailing lists, files and equipment were stolen or destroyed. The break-in had been a part of an ongoing FBI operation, FBI informant Tim Redfern was paid to surveil suspected socialists during the 1970s.

As of 1980, BMR distributed about 2,700 copies per month, and 2,100 were free.

== Mission and purpose ==
Big Mama Rag published news items related to feminist and women's liberation topics, including reproductive rights and abortion, civil rights, lesbianism, and legislation. They included film and culture reviews as well.

According to spokesperson Carol Lease, "The purposes of the paper have been defined in a broad context as the communication of news, ideas, to other women, and in a specific context as proving a way for women to get involved in a real way of working to change and enrich their lives."

BMR recognized the hostile environment that mass media created for women's issues, lesbianism, and feminism, and they often published rebuttals to larger publications that addressed these issues insufficiently.

In 1976, staffers attended the Women in Print Conference in Omaha, Nebraska. After hearing the needs from women's book publishers, BMR changed their book review process to only include women-owned presses.

They shared extensive coverage about violence against women and pornography. They promoted stories of women who experienced violence and were ignored by mainstream media outlets. They included women in the US as well as international stories, eventually recognizing the inequities suffered by minority women. In 1982, the newspaper and collective received criticism for being an all-white group, and the newspaper was seen as a white middle-class paper. Their issues attempted to address the problem with articles and special issues that named racist structures and highlighted women of color. They shared stories from the National Alliance of Black Feminists, focusing on Black women who were missing from mass media. They reported on the 1971 First National Chicana Conference.

== Big Mama Rag, Inc. vs. U.S., 1973-1980 ==
In 1973, BMR applied for federal exempt tax status from the IRS. They were granted nonprofit status in Colorado, but not nationally. The IRS denied their application because the newspaper had political and legislative content and because "its articles promoted lesbianism." The collective saw the organization as an educational one, but the IRS did not agree.

In 1980, a circuit court of appeals sided with them, but it was too late to save the financial outlook for the paper.

== Ending ==
In the early 1980s, the collective was encumbered by infighting and ideological rigidity. Finances became more difficult in the 1980s.

The newspaper shut down in 1984 due to financial and production issues.

== See also ==
- Alternative media
- List of feminist periodicals in the United States
- Radical media
- Second-wave feminism
- Underground press
- Women in print movement
