= Heather Has Two Mommies =

1989 book by Lesléa Newman

- Author: Lesléa Newman
- Illustrator: Diana Souza
- Publisher: Alyson Books
- Publication date: 1989
- Publication place: United States
- ISBN: 1-55583-543-0
- OCLC: 43227323
- Dewey Decimal: [Fic] 21
- LC Class: PZ7.N47988 He 2000

Heather Has Two Mommies is a children's book written by Lesléa Newman with illustrations by Diana Souza. First published in 1989, it was one of the first pieces of LGBTQ+ children's literature to garner broad attention.

In its early years, Heather Has Two Mommies garnered both positive and negative attention due to the lesbian themes present in the book. The book received praise for highlighting the parenthood of lesbian parents, but also drew criticism from people opposed to same-sex parenting, as well as from members of the LGBTQIA+ community who felt the book did not portray same-sex parenthood accurately.

== Summary ==
The story follows a child named Heather who is raised by lesbian women: her biological mother, Jane, who gave birth to her after artificial insemination, and her biological mother's same-sex partner, Kate. At Heather's playgroup, her family situation is discussed simply and positively, as are those of other children in other family units. At first, Heather becomes upset when she realizes that many of her other peers at the playgroup have a father and she does not. Molly, the caretaker at the playgroup, ensures that all the children at the playgroup understand that all families are special and no family type is better than any of the others. By the end of the book, Heather's sadness goes away and she expresses gratitude for her mothers.

== Background ==
The idea for Heather Has Two Mommies was not Newman's own. While out for a walk, Newman was approached by lesbian parents and asked to write a children's story about a family like theirs. The parents explained that there were no books that they could show their daughter that portrayed the life of a family with lesbian parents. According to "The More Things Change" Newman wrote the story for this purpose, but did not expect the book to gain widespread controversy.

== Release, republications ==
The book was originally co-published by Newman and her friend Tzivia Gover under the auspices of Gover's desktop publishing business, "In Other Words, Ink". Six months after the book's publication in December 1989, it was picked up by Alyson Publications.

Alyson Publishing brought out a Special 20th Anniversary edition in 2010, replacing the original black and white drawings with full-color illustrations by its illustrator Diana Souza, a strategy intended to make the book more modern and kid-friendly. That same year, Alyson Publishing company folded and the book went out of print for some time.

Later, the book was picked up by Candlewick Publications and the original illustrations were replaced in post-2015 editions by Laura Cornell, who made one of Heather's moms look like Lesléa Newman.

== Analysis ==
According to Jennifer Esposito, a professor at Georgia State University, Leslea Newman attempts to normalize the lesbian family structure in Heather Has Two Mommies but seems to have done just the opposite. When Heather acknowledges that she does not have a daddy it makes her sad. Esposito argues that because Heather gets upset that she does not have a father instead of wondering why she has two mothers, it portrays that there is a problem with having two mommies. Furthermore, Esposito believes that Heather Has Two Mommies "dequeers" lesbian households by making them equivalent to heterosexual households. She believes that this does a disservice to those children that live in those households because their experience in the real world is a lot different than what is portrayed in the story. Esposito thinks that books dealing with lesbian families should take the approach of informing people that these households are just as normal as other households while at the same time addressing the unique problems they face. Similarly, Esposito admonishes the manner in which queer relationships are presented. Rather than focusing on the queer relationship, Heather's mothers are used more so as a learning experience for heterosexuals.

According to Jaime Naidoo, a scholar in children's queer literature, Newman included the depiction of artificial insemination in the first edition of the book, meaning that this book was the first to portray a lesbian couple deliberately planning the birth of their child. However, Newman later explained her regret in incorporating this detail into the book. Because parents were writing complaints about not reading the book to their children due to the scene, she decided to omit the section altogether in her 10th edition. Many believed the book was aimed at adults because of the artificial insemination sequence, although the book was intended to be child friendly.

Editor Cat Yampell, though Heather has Two Mommies has faced backlash and criticism, the book has also received praise. For example, Newman explains that multiple presses have expressed interest in more manuscripts, including queer stories. Seeing as publishers are becoming more comfortable in asking for more queer content, it seems like Heather has Two Mommies has helped queer children's literature become more accepting.

In addition, researchers argue that books such as Heather has Two Mommies can be beneficial in the educational setting. Scholars Brianna Burke and Kristina Greenfield argue that Heather Has Two Mommies can create a school environment of tolerance and inclusion of members of the LGBTQIA+ community. In addition, scholar Selena Van Horn explains that by presenting elementary school students with books that challenge heteronormativity. They can gain new perspectives on diverse family structures and critically question their prior knowledge on LGBTQIA+ related topics.

== Reception ==
The American Library Association ranked it the 9th most frequently challenged book in the United States in the 1990s.

It is parodied in the 2006 Dav Pilkey book Captain Underpants and the Preposterous Plight of the Purple Potty People. In it, the parallel-universe Miss Singerbrains (the school librarian) invites the two main characters, George and Harold, to read the book Mommy Has Two Heathers as part of that universe's school's banned books week.

=== Challenges ===
According to Leslea Newman, in Fayetteville, North Carolina, people tried to have Heather Has Two Mommies banned from local libraries and schools. Newman claims they were unsuccessful in their attempts, and instead paid for advertisements in local newspapers to convince citizens to vote against the construction of 5 new libraries in the Fayetteville area. The advertisements conveyed that the libraries were in "pursuit of legitimizing homosexuality" and compared homosexuality to "prostitution, bestiality or incest".

According to Jennifer Steele, Assistant Professor of Library and Information Science at The University of Southern Mississippi, another example of an attempted banning of the book took place in Wichita Falls, Texas. Because several residents of the city wanted to ban Heather Has Two Mommies and Daddy's Roommate, the city council declared a resolution that would limit access to the children's books should it reach 300 signatures. With the support of the American Civil Liberties Union, a countersuit was brought forth after the book restrictions were enforced, eventually leading to the Sund v. City of Wichita Falls, Texas (2000) court case. As a result, the District Court ruled in favor of the countersuit and allowed both books to be restored to their previous status.

In another instance, the Wasilla Public Library in Alaska also neglected to shelve the same two books, Heather Has Two Mommies and Daddy's Roommate. Ironically, the books were sent in as a gift during Banned Books Week. When citing why the book was barred from the shelves, the library cited the books were "poorly constructed, lacked engaging illustrations and seemed to lack the ability to engage young readers." The books were later sold in a fundraiser for the library.

=== Support ===
In 1991, Doris Robinson, regional services manager at Fairview Park Regional Library in Cleveland, claims that books such as Heather Has Two Mommies should have a place in schools and libraries around the country, "as long as they tastefully, accurately and appropriately portray the subject matter." Furthermore, Robinson recognizes that keeping LGBTQ subject matter from children would do them a disservice as homosexual couples become a recognized part of society. Robinson asserts that because homosexual families deserve respect, exposing children to Heather Has Two Mommies will teach them to be more accepting of these families.

Additionally, researchers April M. Sanders and Janelle B. Mathis from the University of North Texas have concluded that in order to combat censorship and discrimination in LGBTQ+ literature, young readers, instructors, and parents must learn how to change their attitudes toward LGBTQ+ individuals. Due to the reception of Heather Has Two Mommies, The National Council of Teachers of English (NCTE) issued a resolution (2007) advocating for the inclusion of LGBTQ+ themes in the classroom, as well as standards for teacher training on such inclusions.

== See also ==
- Homosexuality in children's literature
- Daddy's Roommate – a book that portrays a gay couple in a similar positive light. It became a point of discussion in the 2008 US presidential election.
- Jenny Lives with Eric and Martin – a similar book that caused controversy in the United Kingdom.
- The Rainbow Cubby House – an Australian book with similar themes.
- "Bart Has Two Mommies" – an episode of The Simpsons whose title parodies the controversy.
