= Janet Freeman =

American tenant rights activist (1950–2011)

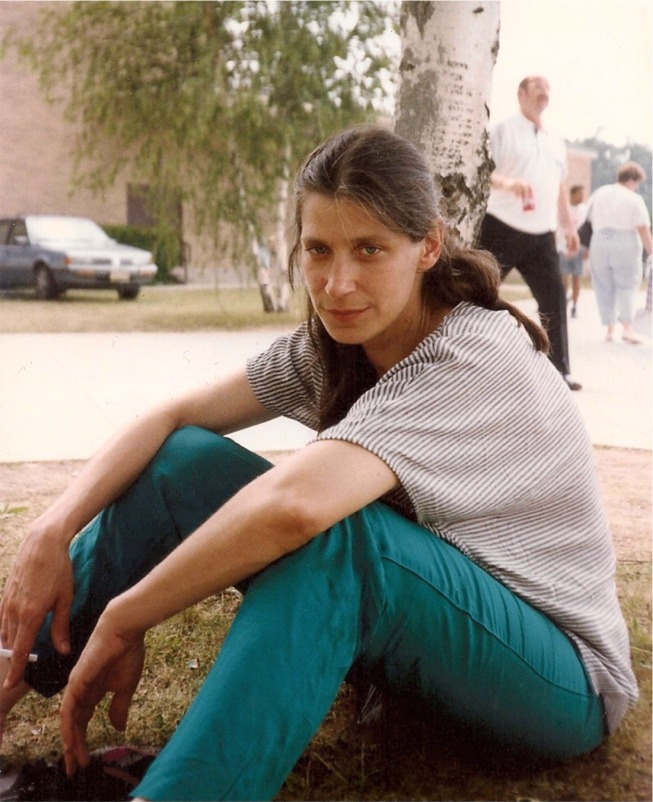
Janet Freeman in 1991

Janet Freeman (May 18, 1950 – April 29, 2011) was an American community organizer and activist for tenant rights in New York City's lower Manhattan. On June 20, 2013, the corner of Elizabeth Street and Kenmare Street was co-named "Janet Freeman Way" by the New York City Council in her memory and to commemorate her activism on behalf of the community. According to NYC Streets in its listing of street names and their honorees, "Janet Freeman was a community organizer and tenant advocate. She founded the Croman Tenants Association; the Coalition to Protect Public Housing and Section 8; and Co-op Watch, to prevent evictions through phony conversions. She started campaigns to organize tenants against aggressive landlords, phony demolitions, and harassment in and around Chinatown and Little Italy."

== Life ==
Janet Freeman grew up in Stuyvesant Town, a middle-income housing complex in Manhattan, New York City. At the age of 17, she moved to Elizabeth Street, eventually occupying a vacant storefront where she lived until her death in 2011. The storefront was notable for its heavily tagged graffiti cover in a neighborhood renowned for its tagging and graffiti art -- (both the Candle Building and the Germania Bank Building (New York City) are down the block and around the corner respectively).

== Activism ==
According to Tenant/Inquilino, the newspaper of Metropolitan Council on Housing: "Freeman was widely admired among tenant advocates for an unusual mix of impressive qualities: her intellect and insight, her personal dedication to ordinary people, her passion for their rights, and the depth, breadth, thoroughness, and accuracy of her research. She employed these in an unbroken series of actions and campaigns over three decades. Protective of her independence and integrity, and averse to bureaucracy, she almost always worked as a free agent or volunteer, even refusing paid positions for the same things she did freely."

=== Tenant and housing activism ===
Freeman defended tenants whether in public housing or in private rentals threatened by predatory landlords and developers. She worked with Met Council, Cooper Square Committee, Good Old Lower East Side (GOLES), University Settlement, and the Coalition for a District Alternative (CoDA). She helped create the Lower East Side Coop Watch, a campaign to protect tenants from hazardous conditions created by landlords in illegal, coercive co-op conversions, resulting in DOB and HPD action to force repairs for tenants’ safety. She also helped create the Croman Tenants Association, Justice for Lincoln Swados (Lincoln was a disabled man who died when his door was blocked during building renovations), was a founding member of the Lower East Side Coalition to Save Public Housing & Section 8 to mobilize and educate tenants, lead organizer of tenants in Extell owned buildings on the LES to prevent evictions, and worked for the City Wide Task Force for Housing.

Through her briefs and oral arguments she set the precedent that stipulations could include owner repairs to Department of Buildings and Environmental Control Board violations. For the 37 Spring Street Tenant Association, she represented the tenants in Housing Court. This case broke Housing Court precedent as the first time a landlord was mandated to correct not only HPD violations but also violations with DOB and DEP, allowing all tenants citywide to bring greater scrutiny in Housing Court to DOB failures in regulation.

For the 196 Elizabeth Street Freeman advised tenants who were displaced by a fire in their tenement building and were unable to regain their home when the landlord failed to rehabilitate the apartments as stipulated by the Court.

For the 167 Elizabeth Street she organized the tenants’ association within her own building when the landlord refused to make repairs and threatened residents who made complaints. Janet provided advice as to how to register complaints and set up a rent strike, while protecting the tenants’ rights under New York City Law. One of these repairs was for an elderly, top-floor tenant with a disabled adult daughter, who had not had running water in their toilet for three years. Freeman organized tenants in nine Croman-owned buildings in Little Italy to document violations and other conditions in preparation for legal action against the landlord, eventually creating a coalition with other Croman-owned building tenants on the Lower East Side, leading to a meeting with the NYS Attorney General about a general pattern of landlord harassment against long-term tenants. She saved the homes of dozens of individual Little Italy tenants facing eviction, providing her expertise on her own time.

Freeman organized and helped individual tenants while also working at a macro level for policy change to preserve affordable housing, and was indispensable to local community organizations including Cooper Square Committee, Good Old Lower East Side (GOLES), Citywide Task Force on Housing (now Housing Court Answers), Metropolitan Council on Housing and Project Home at University Settlement. She assisted a 1995 Joint Planning Council study of displacement, surveying residents, mapping out strategies, doing tenant outreach and organizing buildings.

Freeman organized low-income tenants in Little Italy, Chinatown and the Lower East Side in collaboration with Project Home at University Settlement, to inform them of their rights, help them fight evictions and illegal conversions, and to gain repairs to their buildings, often accompanying tenants to Court. She organized, trained, counseled and educated tenants coming to GOLES and Met Council as direct services to address displacement and other issues affecting low-income communities. As staff member of HCA, she advocated for Court reform and worked a table at Housing Court to provide information to hundreds of tenants facing eviction, often continuing to research details for individual tenants on her own time.

=== Neighborhood activism ===
Freeman's earliest effort was to help get trees planted on the street where she lived. Responding to the invasion of nightlife in Little Italy, Freeman mobilized the community, researching and arguing before the local community board. She also worked with the Houston/Broadway MTA Station fight and the DeSalvio Park renovation. When the neighborhood was threatened with a Las Vegas-style burlesque cabaret, she spearheaded the community's successful opposition. Freeman's research identified application plans that failed to adhere to DOB and SLA regulations, nonconformance to Certificates of Occupancy, fire codes, work without permits, and ADA law. Working in collaboration with Sook Ling Lai, Director of UPK of NY Board of Education Chinatown Head Start and Robin Goldberg, now a CB2 Manhattan Board Member, she monitored new liquor license applications at CB2, informed and mobilized the community when these proposals were projected to be disruptive to neighbors.

== Street co-naming ==
To commemorate Freeman's concern for the people of Little Italy and the Lower East Side, Community Board 2 and the New York City Council, in conjunction with sponsors Chinatown Headstart, Housing Court Answers and Friends of Petrosino Square, co-named Elizabeth Street between Kenmare & Spring Streets "Janet Freeman Way," June 20, 2013. Community Board 2's resolution to rename the street recognized Freeman for "[a]dvocating for tenants’ rights and guiding and organizing tenants, in her building, on her block, and in her surrounding community, to successfully fight rapacious landlords and avoid eviction as well as fight violations and receive rightful repairs. Sharing her extensive knowledge of laws and research skills with tenants as well as advocacy and community organizations for guidance in their activities to help protect tenants and preserve affordable housing. Working with such groups as Cooper Sq. Committee, Good Old Lower East Side, Citywide Task Force on Housing (now Housing Court Answers), Metropolitan Council on Housing and Project Home (at the University Settlement) to both advocate for tenants and effect policy change. Organizing the Lower East Side Co-op Watch to protect tenants from hazardous conditions created by landlords in illegal, coercive co-op conversions. Organizing her neighborhood to fight an oversaturation of bars in the community, including defeat of a burlesque bar in a residential building at Kenmare and Elizabeth. Obtaining matching funds in the 1970s for the city to plant the now-mature trees on her Elizabeth St. block between Kenmare and Spring Sts. Mentoring the formation and organization of other community organizations with shared concerns, such as the Friends of Petrosino Park. Fighting and helping defeat a proposal for an MTA substation at the Houston-Broadway subway station...".
