= Lover (novel) =

1976 lesbian feminist novel by Bertha Harris

- Author: Bertha Harris
- Language: English
- Genre: Lesbian literature, Postmodern literature
- Publisher: Daughters, Inc.
- Publication date: 1976
- Publication place: United States
- Media type: Print
- ISBN: 0-8147-3505-3
- OCLC: 28026869
- Dewey Decimal: 813/.54 20
- LC Class: PS3558.A6426 L6 1993
- Preceded by: Confessions of Cherubino

Lover is a lesbian feminist novel by Bertha Harris, published in 1976 by Daughters, Inc., a Vermont small press dedicated to women's fiction. It is considered Harris's most ambitious work, and has been compared to Djuna Barnes's Nightwood and the stories of Jane Bowles. Harris has said that it was written "straight from the libido, while I was madly in love, and liberated by the lesbian cultural movement of the mid-1970s."

== Aesthetics and critical reception ==
Lover's prose is distinctly postmodern, eschewing conventional narrative for experimental narrative techniques. In contrast to some lesbian novels of the time, such as Rita Mae Brown's Rubyfruit Jungle (also, incidentally, published by Daughters), which used a prototypical bildungsroman technique with a lesbian placed squarely at the center, Lover reflects complex notions of radical lesbian philosophy, community, family structure, and eroticism by using highly inventive, often fantastical storytelling techniques. In Harris's introduction to the 1993 edition, she writes, "Lover should be absorbed as if it were a theatrical performance. There's tap dancing and singing, disguise, sleights of hand, mirror illusions, quick-change acts, and drag." Amanda C. Gable has argued that Lover "can be considered an exemplary novel within discussions of both postmodern fiction and lesbian (or queer) theory," and calls for "Harris to be added to the group of writers such as Wittig, Anzaldúa, Lorde, and Winterson, who are discussed within the context of a postmodern lesbian narrative."

== Publishing history ==
The women's movement in the 1970s established many small, independent presses. Lover is an example of a book published by one of these presses. It was reprinted in 1993 by New York University Press.
