= Applesauce (novel) =

1966 experimental feminist novel by June Arnold

- Arnold on the cover of the first edition
- Author: June Arnold
- Language: English
- Publisher: McGraw Hill
- Publication place: United States
- OCLC: 3671045

Applesauce is a 1966 novel by June Arnold. It is a work of feminist literature with an avant-garde and experimental style, including an unreliable narrator, a non-linear narrative, and unconventional semiotics and orthography. The novel's themes include gender, androgyny, motherhood, suicide, and substance abuse.

The plot follows Liza, a young woman raised in the American South who struggles to conform with restrictive gender stereotypes. Liza fragments her sense of self into several personas: Eloise the sex kitten, Rebecca the intellectual, Lila the Earth mother, and Gus, a male alter ego she invents to nurture her true identity independent of womanhood and conventional femininity. Liza/Gus's reflections as a forty-five year old divorced single mother underscore the socially constructed nature of gender.

Applesauce received mixed reviews upon its initial publication, but was more warmly received when it was reprinted in 1977 by Daughters, Inc., an independent feminist press cofounded by Arnold. Critics and scholars have compared the novel to other works of modernist and feminist literature, including Orlando and "A Room of One's Own" by Virginia Woolf and The Left Hand of Darkness by Ursula K. Le Guin. Along with Arnold's other novels, Applesauce is considered a classic of feminist and lesbian literature.

== Plot ==
Applesauce is a nonlinear narrative of the protagonist Liza's life, including her childhood in Tennessee, adolescence and married life in Houston, Texas, and her life as a reclusive single mother in New York City. The plot is structured in three sections entitled "Eloise," "Rebecca," and "Lila." The pressure of traditional gender roles and several traumatic events, including the death of her son and possible suicide of her brother, cause Liza to fracture her sense of self into multiple identities: Eloise, Rebecca, Lila, and a male alter ego called Gus. In her internal monologue, Liza treats each alter ego as a separate person; as Gus, she describes Eloise, Rebecca, and Lila as Gus's former wives.

At the beginning of the novel, Liza/Gus is forty-five years old. She obsessively designs and constructs a room within a room, so the new inner room can contain the core of her true identity. While building the room, Liza/Gus reflects on the different female archetypes she has felt forced to embody and kill throughout her life: sex kitten (Eloise), intellectual (Rebecca), and earth mother (Lila).

== Development and publication history ==
June Arnold wrote Applesauce after the breakdown of her marriage, the death of her son in an accidental drowning, and a move from Houston, Texas to Greenwich Village in New York City so she could pursue writing. While in New York, Arnold became involved with the women's liberation movement and lesbian feminism. In the forward to the 1977 edition, Arnold reflected that she wrote Applesauce to "unscramble the tangle my experiences had produced; instead of 'lessons' I ended up with a giant purée of a life." She described herself as incapable of fully understanding her thoughts and feelings, writing that she "tried instead to present them in such a way that the reader could experience them along with me. It is here, I believe, that a novel can be far in advance of the conscious brain."

Applesauce was first published by McGraw Hill in 1966. It is notable for being a twentieth-century work with lesbian themes which was released by a mainstream publisher. McGraw Hill forced Arnold to censor some of the novel's language, including changing "cunt" to "vagina" and "fuck" to "screw." This was one of the reasons Arnold founded Daughters, Inc., a feminist press that was part of the women in print movement, an effort by second-wave feminists to control the publication and printing of their own writings. Arnold believed that independent presses such as Daughters should encourage experimentation and the development of a specifically lesbian and feminist avant-garde aesthetic. Daughters later reprinted Applesauce in 1977.

== Themes ==
Applesauce explores themes that became prominent in Arnold's later work, including gender, androgyny, relationships, perceptions of reality, unreliable narrators, and substance abuse. In her foreword to the 1977 edition, Arnold described the novel's themes as "children, suicide, mothers, sex, sexual costumes and manners, language, food, nature, and the primary struggle of a woman to be a woman." Arnold's daughter Roberta has written that her mother's first novel is about "how social roles and societal expectations can peel, core, and squash you."

Arnold frequently employs images and metaphors about apples (including mashing, bursting, cores, and skins) and serpents throughout the novel, alluding to Eve and the forbidden fruit. Natalie Rosinsky notes that Arnold's references to apples highlight how "women are often labelled and treated as indistinguishable members of a consumable class," like apples or bananas.

Liza's shifting identities represent “gender-inflicted changes in the character and her personality” such as marriage, motherhood, and entering graduate school. Scholars generally agree that Liza does not adopt Gus as a male persona because she is transgender or wants to become a man. Rather, the change is motivated by her desire to build a sense of self separate from the conventional trappings of womanhood. Each of Liza's identities, apart from Gus, exists primarily as a means to satisfy the needs of others in her roles as daughter, wife, female graduate student, and mother. Liza chafes under these inadequate and limiting archetypes of selfhood and has moments of intense female rage.

Liza/Gus's androgyny draws attention to the socially constructed nature of gender. In one passage, Liza/Gus looks in a mirror and perceives both traditionally feminine and traditionally masculine features in her face, voice, and demeanor. In another section, Liza/Rebecca reflects that all people struggle to balance their desire for conventionally masculine qualities such as freedom and strength with the conventional feminine values of security and protection. Arnold suggests that it is not accurate or useful to categorize physical and personality traits as masculine or feminine. On the contrary, it is damaging and forces both women and men to suppress aspects of themselves that contradict their socialized gender. Male characters are also harmed by restrictive gender roles, including Liza's husband (also named Gus) and her suicidal brother Dick, who was punished for experimenting with gender in his childhood drawings. Ultimately, Arnold posits that all humans contain an androgynous mixture of traits that have been artificially labeled as masculine and feminine.

Applesauce ends ambiguously, with Liza/Gus's children throwing her a birthday party to commemorate the completion of her room within a room. Some scholars, such as Morgan, interpret Liza/Gus's final proclamation of “I am Liza!” as the successful reintegration of her identity. However, Liza's declaration is repeated and fragmented by the voice of Echo, a nymph cursed to repeat the last words spoken to her. Rosinsky suggests that this addition is a "reminder of the frailty of individual resolve against mythologized sexual stereotypes." Arnold's daughters Roberta and Fairfax describe the ending of Applesauce as a disintegration of Liza's identity.

== Reception ==
Applesauce received mixed reviews upon its initial publication in 1966, largely due to Arnold’s experimental style and the abrupt shifts in Liza's names and pronouns, which some critics found confusing. Arnold believed the novel was broadly misunderstood, writing that “reviewers understood the book in Freudian terms and it was meant as an experience in womanness.”

The novel was more positively received after Daughters, Inc. reprinted it in 1977, particularly in feminist and lesbian outlets. The Washington Post published a positive review in 1978 that called the novel “charming, jumbled, [and] complex.”

Applesauce is now regarded as a feminist and lesbian classic, along with Arnold's other works.

== Critical analysis ==
Despite the novel's contemporary setting, several literary scholars have classified Applesauce as speculative fiction, specifically feminist fantasy or androgynous fantasy. Fantastical elements include the differing complexions and body types Liza inhabits as each of her personas, as well as the alter egos’ literal and physical deaths each time Liza is reborn with a new name, body, and identity.

Feminist scholars have drawn comparisons between Applesauce and other feminist fiction that explores gender, fragmented identities, and androgyny, including The Left Hand of Darkness by Ursula K. Le Guin, The Awakening by Kate Chopin, The Female Man by Joanna Russ, The Lesbian Body by Monique Wittig, and A Sea Change by Lois Gould, among others.

Virginia Woolf was a particularly significant influence on Arnold. There are several parallels between Applesauce and Woolf's 1928 novel Orlando: A Biography, in which an ageless male poet from the Elizabethan era mysteriously becomes a woman about a century into his life. In both Orlando and Applesauce, the androgynous protagonists cannot be easily classified into stereotypical gender categories. Woolf and Arnold also challenge the phallogocentrism of the patriarchal literary establishment, which privileges hierarchy, linearity, fixity, and essentialism. Additionally, Liza/Gus's fixation on building a room within a room has been read as a response to Woolf's 1929 essay "A Room of One's Own." Liza longs for a room of her own where she can be herself and also contain her wandering sense of self. Arnold was likely also influenced by the advent of new physics in the 1960s, which revealed the uncertainty and mutability of physical reality. By creating a non-linear stream-of-consciousness narrative and unreliable narrator, Arnold conveyed a uniquely feminine, fractured consciousness, similar to modernists such as Woolf, Dorothy Richardson, and Rosamund Lehmann.

Rosinsky describes Applesauce's narrative strategy as innovative because it relies on the reader to interpret and make sense of the text's meaning. Arnold also experiments with semiotic conventions and orthography to convey that languages and symbols created by men are inadequate for describing women's experiences. For example, Arnold invents a new punctuation mark to describe Liza/Rebecca's sex life with her husband. In another passage, an argument between Liza/Gus and her mother is rendered as two parallel columns of text, to represent them talking over each other. This is potentially disruptive to the reader, because it is unclear in which order the dialogue should be read. According to Rosinsky, by “disrupting the patriarchal tradition of discursive linearity, this technique presents the reader in miniature with the problems of living without clear definitions, or within what were previously foreign ones."

== Sources ==
- "Applesauce by June Arnold". Kirkus Reviews. 1966. Archived from the original on April 23, 2026.
- Arnold, June (1977). Applesauce. Daughters, Inc.
- Arnold, June (1976). "Feminist Presses and Feminist Politics". Quest. 3 (1).
- Arnold, Roberta. "My Mother Was Many Things". Southern Lesbian Feminist Activist Herstory Project. Archived from the original on October 3, 2024.
- Arnold, Roberta; Arnold, Fairfax (2013). "Art Is Politics". Sinister Wisdom. 89: 34–38.
- "Bookmarks". Prairie Schooner. 41 (1): 92. 1967.
- Cottrell, Debbie Mauldin. "Arnold, June Fairfax Davis". Texas State Historical Association. Archived from the original on April 17, 2026.
- Gabriele, Joan (1995). "Arnold, June". The Oxford Companion to Women's Writing in the United States. Oxford University Press. ISBN 9780195066081.
- Glenn, Ellen Walker (1980). The Androgynous Woman Character in the American Novel (PhD thesis). University of Colorado at Boulder.
- Gould, Lois (January 2, 1977). "Creating a Women's World". The New York Times. Archived from the original on February 20, 2025.
- Harker, Jaime (2018). The Lesbian South: Southern Feminists, the Women in Print Movement, and the Queer Literary Canon. University of North Carolina Press. ISBN 9781469643359.
- Hoffman, Amy (1978). "Applesauce". Sister Courage. 3 (3).
- Horn, Carter (January 7, 1978). "Women and Women". The Washington Post. Archived from the original on June 2, 2025.
- Kester-Shelton, Pamela (1996). "June (Davis) Arnold". Feminist Writers. St. James Press. ISBN 9781558622173.
- McClure, Julie (April 30, 1967). "Life in Applesauce Is All Chopped Up". The Atlanta Constitution.
- Morgan, Ellen (1977). "The Feminist Novel of Androgynous Fantasy". Frontiers: A Journal of Women Studies. 2 (3): 40–49. doi:10.2307/3346348.
- Morris, Adelaide (1992). "First Persons Plural in Contemporary Feminist Fiction". Tulsa Studies in Women's Literature. 11 (1): 11–29. doi:10.2307/463778.
- Myers, JoAnne, ed. (2013). "Arnold, June (Davis) (1926-1982)". Historical Dictionary of the Lesbian and Gay Liberation Movements (1st ed.). Rowman and Littlefield. ISBN 9780810872264.
- Richards, Dell (1990). Lesbian Lists: A Look at Lesbian Culture, History, and Personalities. New York: Alyson Publications. ISBN 9781555831639.
- Riley, Jocelyn (1978). "Changing Names Shedding Skins". Sojourner. Vol. 3, no. 12.
- Rosinsky, Natalie M. (1982). Feminist Theory in Women's Speculative Fiction, 1966-1981 (PhD thesis). University of Wisconsin-Madison.
- Rosinsky, Natalie M. (1984). Feminist Futures: Contemporary Women's Speculative Fiction. Ann Arbor, Michigan: UMI Research Press. ISBN 9780835719698.
- Wilson, Barbara (May 12, 1978). "Applesauce and Androgyny". Seattle Gay News. Vol. 5, no. 9.
- Zimmerman, Bonnie (1995). "Introduction". The Cook and the Carpenter. New York University Press. ISBN 9780814706312.
