= Frances Goldin =

American housing rights activist (1924–2020)

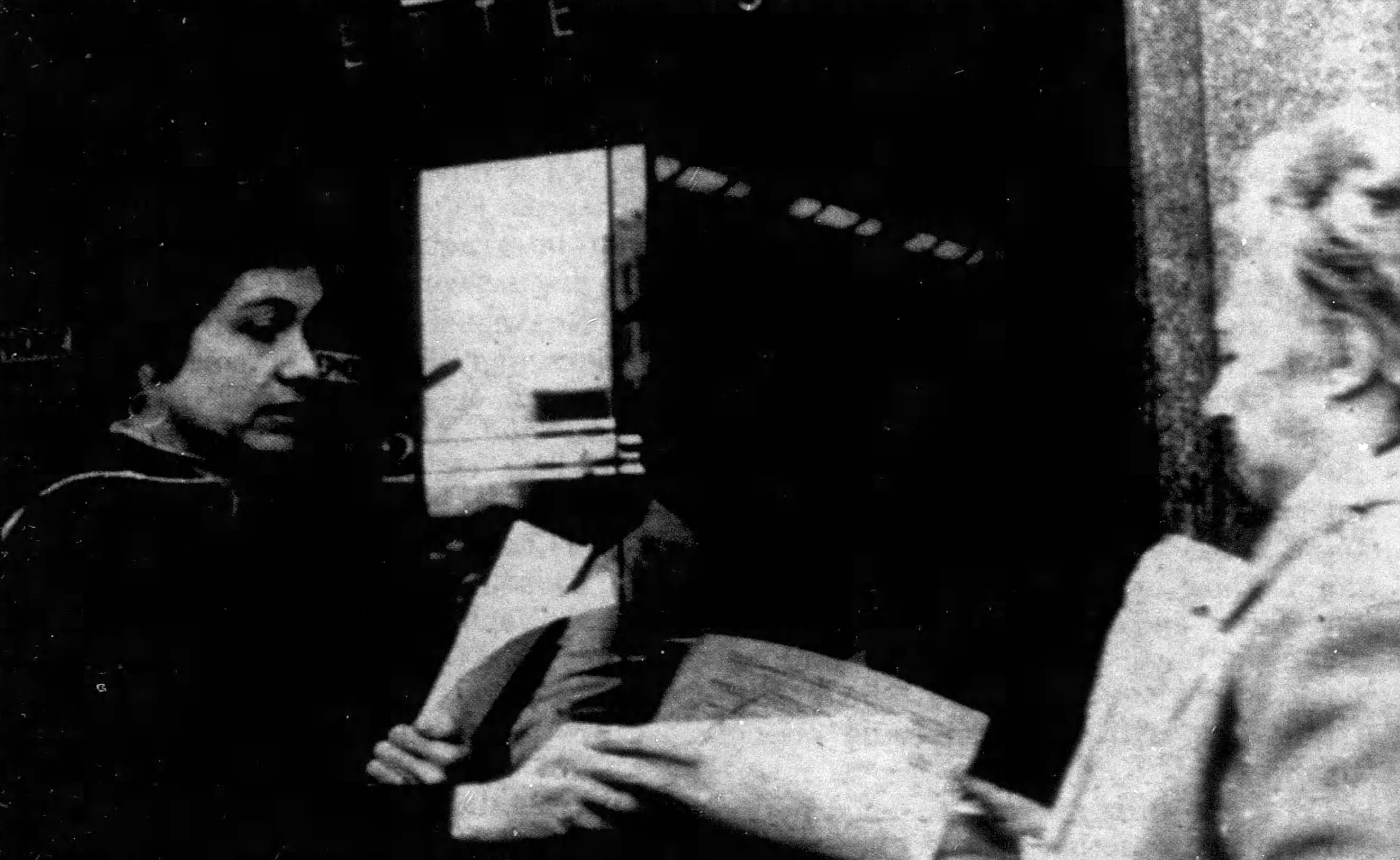
Goldin (left) petitions in front of the New York City Planning Commission building c. 1969

Frances Axler Goldin (June 22, 1924 – May 16, 2020) was a housing rights activist and literary agent in New York City. She was a founding member of the Metropolitan Council on Housing and the Cooper Square Committee. Beginning in 1959, she led a successful campaign to defeat an urban renewal plan of Robert Moses, which would have replaced historic, affordable housing with a freeway on the Lower East Side. For decades, Goldin was associated with the Lower East Side, where she was a neighborhood preservationist and community figure. The 175 Essex Building of Essex Crossing is named in her honor, and she was profiled in the documentary It Took 50 Years.

== Early life ==
Frances Goldin was born on June 22, 1924, and she grew up in Springfield Gardens, Queens. Her parents were working-class Jewish immigrants from Russia and Ukraine. Her father, Michael Axler, was a toolmaker and mechanic for the Metropolitan Transportation Authority (MTA). Frances described him as a "freethinker" and "very much a union man." Her mother, Sophie (Saslowsky) Axler, was a homemaker and former seamstress who had been fired due to her union activity.

Frances had a difficult youth; she described her childhood as "miserable." Her neighborhood was almost entirely Christian. She experienced antisemitism, and bricks flew at her family's window when they lit candles on Friday night for Shabbat on at least two occasions. She also experienced class discrimination as a child. Many of the neighborhood families were wealthier, and neighborhood fathers often worked in business capacities. As she later explained, "I hated where we lived... We were one of nine Jewish families. The other eight Jewish families were shopkeepers. My father was a worker. So we were shunned by the non-Jews and shunned by the Jews, because my father worked with his hands."

As a teen, Goldin attended Andrew Jackson High School, where she was valedictorian. Her parents expected her to become a traditional Jewish wife. Her mother wanted her to go to secretarial school rather than college. During this time, Goldin met communists while working at the War Shipping Administration, and "they quickly converted me." When Goldin was 19 years old, she joined the Communist Party. She enrolled in the Jefferson School of Social Science, an adult education school that was founded and managed by the Communist Party USA. At Jefferson, Goldin studied the history of capitalism and socialism, and she read Karl Marx and Friedrich Engels.

In 1944, when Frances was 20 years old, she married Morris Goldin. The couple had met through the Communist Party. Morris was also a party member, and he was a leader of the Government Workers’ Union. The couple moved to the Lower East Side of Manhattan, where they lived in a one-bedroom apartment in the fourth floor of a building. On the Lower East Side, she found "nirvana." She explained, "It was amazing to see people of different nationalities, colors, opinions, living together in harmony. And what bound them was poverty."

== Early activism ==
Goldin first became involved with housing rights activism when she visited the Lower East Side Tenement and Consumer Council. At the time, she wanted to confirm that she was being charged the correct rent ($65 per month) by her landlord. After confirming that this was the case, "...they said, 'You seem intelligent, would you like to come work in the tenant council and help us out?' I said sure, and I’ve worked with the tenant council ever since. I never left," as she explained in an interview.

In some of her early work, Frances helped translate and interpret for Yiddish speakers at the tenant clinic. She also met with local American Labor Party organizers.

In 1950, when she was 27 years old, Goldin ran for the New York State Senate, as part of the American Labor Party. The ticket also included W.E.B. DuBois. Due to these political activities, the Goldins were blacklisted and under surveillance by the Federal Bureau of Investigation (FBI). This resulted in her husband losing his job, and Frances became the sole income earner in the family. She supported the family by working as a secretary.

== Cooper Square activism ==
In 1959, she led an effort to oppose a Robert Moses plan to bulldoze twelve blocks of the Lower East Side, which was marketed as "urban renewal." The plan was to build a proposed Cross-Manhattan Expressway, so that wealthy residents could more easily commute to Wall Street. Through these efforts, Goldin co-founded Cooper Square Committee, along with Thelma Burdick and Walter Thabit. The Committee advocates for affordable housing and tenant rights. In 1961, the Committee released Alternate Plan for Cooper Square, which proposed the building of public housing on vacant lots. Through their pressures, a vote was made by the New York City Board of Estimate, which adopted the Alternate Plan for Cooper Square. In total, the work of Goldin and the Committee saved 328 tenement apartments, and an additional 530 income-restricted apartments were later built in Cooper Square.

Despite these efforts, the Committee struggled to find wider support in local government until David Dinkins became mayor. In 1990, they signed a Memorandum of Understanding, which stated that they would oversee affordable housing development in neighborhood under the Cooper Square Mutual Housing Association.

Finally, in 2012, the committee's plan came to fruition, after years of activism, when the city decided to develop a housing cooperative, where residents could buy their apartments for as little as $250 per unit. She said, "We organized and demonstrated and finally beat [Robert Moses] 50 years later." The story of Cooper Square Committee has inspired other local groups that advocate for the poor in New York City, such as Picture the Homeless.

Goldin was also a founding member of the Metropolitan Council for Housing, and she became an advocate for squatter rights.

== Seward Park activism ==
In the 1960s, Goldin was involved in the movement that advocated for former tenants of Seward Park. In total, 1800 residents had been displaced by Seward Park Urban Renewal Area on Delancey Street, with the evacuation process largely completed by 1959. The effort was initially led by Robert Moses, as part of his Slum Clearance Committee, and then continued to be led by other organizations and interests. Goldin advocated for the right of the former tenants to return to their homes. The elite figures of the neighborhood represented the interests of the primarily assimilated, middle-class tenants. Meanwhile, the primarily Asian and Latino immigrant tenants represented a newer generation in the neighborhood. In 2018, after fifty years of struggle, a 100-unit low-income senior citizen building was completed in the area, where 50% of the units are allocated for affordable housing. The building was named Frances Goldin Houses in her honor.

== Literary agency ==
Beginning in the 1950s, Goldin began to work in a small literary agency, so she could begin to understand the publishing industry. Eventually, in 1977, Goldin launched Frances Goldin Literary Agency, which focused on left-wing writers. Her clients included Dorothy Allison, Staceyann Chin, Martin Duberman, Mumia Abu-Jamal, Barbara Kingsolver, Adrienne Rich, Robert Meeropol, Juan Gonzalez, and Mike Wallace. She said, "I do not market any material that is sexist, racist, homophobic or gratuitously violent." Many of the authors were included in Imagine: Living in a Socialist USA, published by Goldin, in 2014.

In 2012, Goldin received the Michele Karlsberg Leadership Award from the Publishing Triangle.

== Protests ==
Goldin was a key figure in multiple protest movements and marches. With her daughter Reeni, she participated in the 1971 Fifth Street Women's Building Takeover, when over 100 women occupied an abandoned city building in order to establish a women's center and lesbian center. Goldin was a longtime advocate for LGBTQ rights and participated in the NYC Pride March for 35 years. She was known to carry a sign that read, "I Adore my Lesbian Daughters KEEP THEM SAFE," and she became a recognizable figure of the parades.

As she aged, Goldin continued to protest. In 2011, Goldin was involved in the Occupy Wall Street protests. She was known to carry a sign that said, “I’m 87 and MAD AS HELL." In 2018, when she was 92 years old, she participated in the Women's March in a wheelchair. She raised her fist and chanted, "92 and Comin’ Through!”

For many years, Goldin was known for her outspoken personality and distinctive style. In her old age, she had a neon purple streak in her white hair, and she wore a pin that said "TAX THE RICH," which was pinned to a purple sweatshirt.

== Personal life ==
Goldin was married to Morris Goldin, a staff member of the New York State American Labor Party and advisor to Congressman Vito Marcantonio in East Harlem. Frances and Morris divorced in 1971. The couple had two daughters, Sally and Reeni, who are both lesbians. They both came out after their first pride parade in 1970. Every year since then Goldin attended the NYC Pride Parade where she was always seen holding the same banner: "I Adore My Lesbian Daughters- Keep Them Safe."

== Death ==
On May 16, 2020, Goldin died at her home on East 11th Street, where she had lived for nearly 50 years. She had endured years of declining health before her death. She was 95 years old. The New York Times called her a "...protester, provocateur and voice for lost causes" in its obituary. The Indypendent dedicated a full page obituary to her, in which they wrote, "Frances Goldin was relentless, her enthusiasm infectious. And her life shows the value of being a long distance runner." She is survived by her daughter Reeni Goldin and daughter-in-law Marge Burns, daughter Sally Goldin, and her grandson, Morris Goldin.

== See also ==
- Cooper Square Committee
