= Fifth Street Women's Building Takeover =

1971 feminist protest in New York City

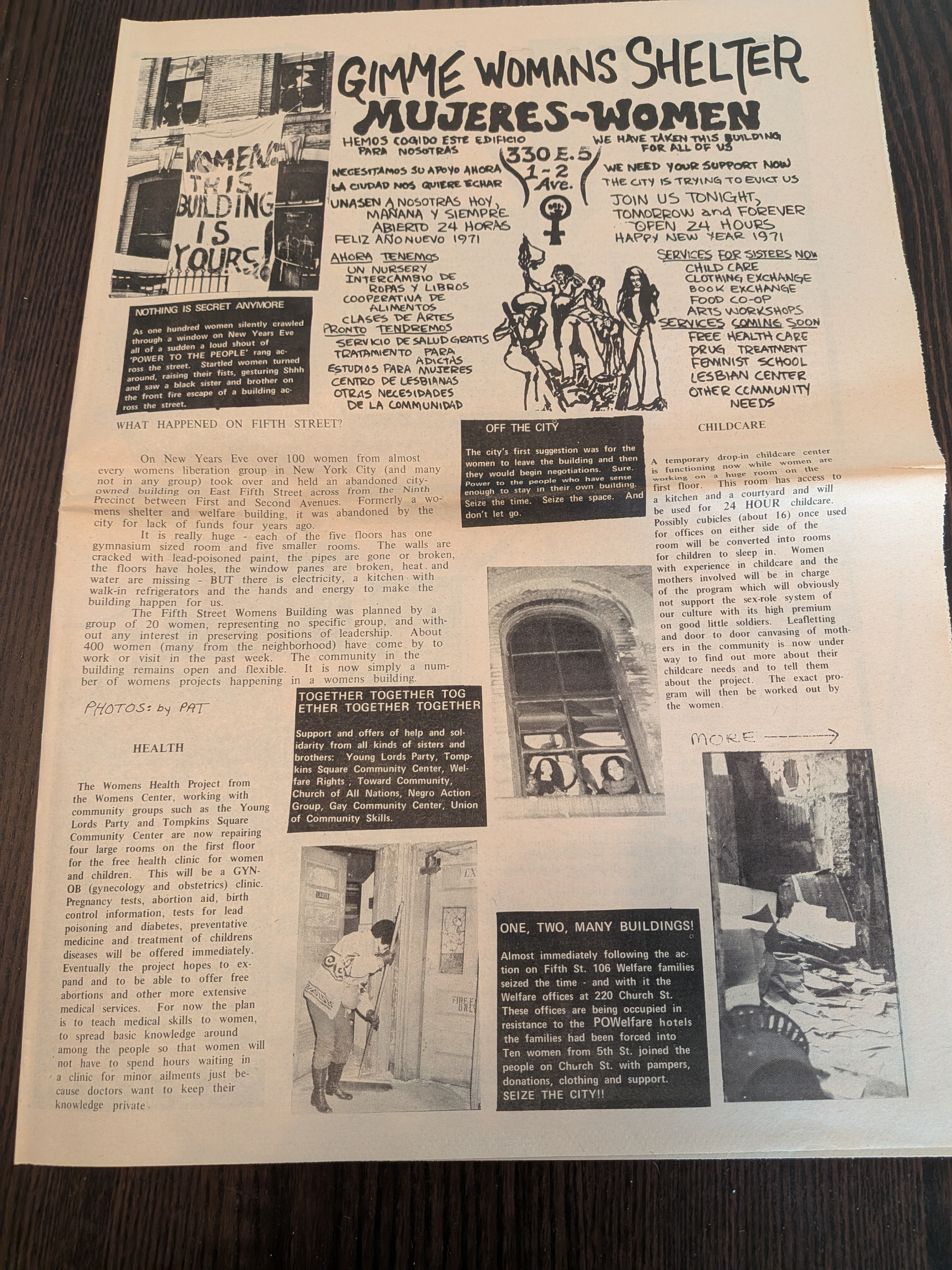
- Article about the takeover in Rat Subterranean News
- Date: January 1, 1971 – January 13, 1971
- Location: New York City; 40°43′34″N 73°59′16″W
- Goals: Women's liberation, affordable housing
- Methods: Squatting, sit-ins

Lead figures
June Arnold	Reeni Goldin	Marizel Rios

Casualties
- Injuries: 5+
- Arrested: 24

The Fifth Street Women's Building Takeover was a feminist protest action in New York City that lasted from January 1 to January 13, 1971. June Arnold, Reeni Goldin, Marizel Rios, and other feminists in the women's liberation movement organized the takeover in late 1970 after the city rebuffed their proposal to establish a women's center in an abandoned city building. Frustrated by the lack of affordable housing and social services for women, over 100 women from a coalition of 40 feminist groups occupied 330 East Fifth Street shortly after midnight on January 1, 1971.

The East Fifth Street Women's Action Committee squatted in the building for thirteen days, establishing a women's center with a homeless shelter, day care center, food co-operative, lesbian center, medical clinic, and other services for women. Feminists aimed to renovate and maintain the derelict building themselves, and tradespeople were invited to provide demonstrations so women could learn about carpentry, plumbing, and home repair. Negotiations with city officials failed after the Women's Action Committee refused to provide the city welfare office with a list of women who came to the women's building to receive services.

Police raided the women's building on the morning of January 13, 1971 and arrested twenty-four women for trespassing, assault, and resisting arrest. The charges were later dropped, largely due to Arnold's suggestion that the women turn their backs to police photographers and appear in court wearing makeup, coiffed hair, and high heels so they would be unrecognizable to law enforcement. 330 East Fifth Street was demolished and turned into a parking lot for a nearby police precinct.

The Fifth Street Women's Building Takeover is one of the most famous protests of the women's liberation movement. Organizers and participants were inspired to pursue other feminist separatist and lesbian feminist causes. Marizel Rios and Jane Lurie went on to found Labyris, the first feminist bookstore in New York City, where they coined the popular feminist slogan "the future is female." Arnold wrote an experimental novel inspired by the takeover, The Cook and the Carpenter. When she could not find a press willing to publish the novel, Arnold and her partner Parke Bowman founded Daughters, Inc., a feminist press that exclusively published feminist and lesbian fiction. Arnold became a leader in the women in print movement, which sought to establish autonomous networks of feminist authors, printers, publishers, and booksellers circulating writings by and for women.

== Origins and takeover ==
As part of urban renewal initiatives in the 1960s and 1970s, New York City began razing low income housing and planning highways that cut through working-class neighborhoods. Various groups of squatters organized building occupations to protest poor residents being evicted while a large number of city-owned buildings stood empty. In addition to concerns about affordable housing for vulnerable and disadvantaged women, feminists argued that the city's welfare services did not adequately address women's needs for affordable health care, education, and child care.

A coalition of over forty feminist groups had previously asked New York City officials if they could establish a women's center in an abandoned city building. When legal avenues stalled, June Arnold and Reeni Goldin discussed squatting while researching housing rights at the Women's Liberation Center. They formed a reconnaissance team that scouted derelict city properties to find a suitable location. Planning meetings took place at Washington Square Methodist Episcopal Church. In addition to Arnold and Goldin, organizers included Sarah Davidson, Susan Sherman, Kady Van Duers, Marizel Rios, and Buffy Yasmin. Other participants included Jane Lurie, Anna Sanches, and Goldin's mother Frances Goldin, who founded the Cooper Square Committee to advocate for affordable housing and tenant rights.

At midnight on January 1, 1971, over 100 women illegally occupied 330 East Fifth Street, which had previously been a welfare office. The takeover aimed to use grassroots, non-hierarchical self-governance to provide resources by and for women. The feminists organized themselves under the name East Fifth Street Women's Action Committee and aimed to "join in solidarity with our sisters who are squatting throughout the city in their attempts to get decent housing." Women rotated shifts as guards and coordinators, with nightly meetings to discuss the events of the day, strategize, and consider proposals for new initiatives. Committees were established for negotiating with the city, communicating with the press, and creating fliers and educational materials in Spanish.

The feminists immediately began making repairs to the derelict building, including removing lead paint, closing off an empty elevator shaft, repairing floors, restoring power, and installing plumbing so the furnace could be turned on. The women's goal was to fix and maintain the building themselves. Skilled women taught others about carpentry and plumbing. Male tradespeople were only permitted into the building if they were willing to provide demonstrations. The committee also secured a donation from a local glass factory which would have allowed them to repair all of the broken windows in the building.

The women's building provided a variety of services, including a twenty-four hour day care, food cooperative, clothing and book exchange, and a shelter for homeless women. Women hosted consciousness raising groups and classes in art, karate, and home repair. A health center provided OBGYN care, preventive care, diagnostic tests, basic first aid, and educational materials so women could learn about their own bodies and treat minor ailments themselves. Long-term goals included providing abortion care, a drug treatment program, and a feminist school. Over 400 women, mostly locals from the neighborhood, came to the women's building to contribute or receive services.

The women's building also established a lesbian center to distribute information about housing discrimination, plan zaps, and provide legal aid for lesbian mothers who had lost custody of their children. Lucy Komisar and the National Organization for Women refused to endorse the women's building because of the inclusion of a lesbian center. However, Reeni Goldin later estimated that 80% of the women who first occupied the building were lesbians.

== City response and negotiations ==
Police officers from the nearby 9th Precinct arrived on the first night of the action. Frances Goldin was chosen to speak with law enforcement on behalf of the squatters. She assured the police chief that the women knew how to operate the building's furnace and had a nurse to provide medical care if needed.

During the occupation, organizers instructed women in the building to cooperate with city authorities. Two city inspectors came to tour the site and ripped out equipment that was critical for operating the furnace. Representatives from Mayor John Lindsay's office, the East Side Urban Task Force, and the city Department of Real Estate were also allowed to enter the building to negotiate.

Initially, negotiations focused on the feminists being allowed to keep the building and continue operating it as a women's center. Officials instead offered another abandoned city property, but when a group of women went to inspect the second building, they discovered it had already been promised to another government department months previously. The city also proposed turning the Fifth Street building into a halfway house run by the Women's Action Committee. However, the committee would be required to provide the city welfare office with the names and financial circumstances of women staying in the shelter. The women refused these terms, and the women's building was raided by police soon after.

== Arrests, trials, and aftermath ==
On the evening of January 12, 1971, law enforcement and the Department of Real Estate entered 330 East Fifth Street, ordered the occupants to disperse, and arrested three women. The next morning, city officials began boarding up the building. Approximately 25 women reentered the women's building and refused to leave. A crowd of 75 people gathered to protest the raid. The altercation became violent, with police using their clubs and defacing the women's building's signs with phrases such as "fuck a pussy tonight." Protestors punched and kicked police, leading to five officers being treated for minor injuries.

Twenty-four women, including Arnold, were arrested and charged with criminal trespass, assault, resisting arrest, and harassment. The Department of Real Estate said they could not allow the women to continue squatting in the building because it was a health hazard. The Women's Action Committee issued a press release which blamed the city for allowing the building to become a safety hazard to the community by leaving it abandoned for over four years. The release also listed the repairs the women had made during the takeover. The feminists also claimed city officials had promised not to arrest them if they cooperated during negotiations and lied about their previous visits to inspect the premises.

While in jail, the protestors chanted feminist songs, passed notes to women in other cells, and ripped down misogynistic posters on the police bulletin board. Another protest was held on January 16, with women chanting "our hands, our feet, our minds, our bodies are tools for change." Protestors distributed leaflets reading "We have been arrested and harassed for making a safety hazard into useful space. We know that the City of New York is the criminal. City government is not providing for the needs of the people, and when the people try to provide for themselves, they are arrested and beaten."

The women's building continued operating "in exile" at an abandoned storefront on Fourth Street for several weeks in January and February 1971. Feminists organized sit-ins in government offices, a letter writing campaign, and a petition that received over 500 signatures to protest their removal from the women's building.

During the protests and arrests, the feminists turned their backs on police cameras. June Arnold also encouraged women who had been arrested to attend court with coiffed hair, makeup, and conventionally feminine attire. Law enforcement did not recognize some of their alleged assailants and could not positively identify them in court. Most of the charges were subsequently dropped or reduced.

330 East Fifth Street was demolished and turned into a parking lot for the police precinct across the street.

== Impact and legacy ==
Feminist literary scholar Jaime Harker describes the Fifth Street women's building takeover as one of the most famous protest actions of the feminist movement. Although short-lived, the takeover was broadly influential on feminist thought and culture during the women's liberation movement, particularly for feminist separatists and lesbian feminists.

Reeni Goldin and Buffy Yasmin were inspired to become electricians after the takeover, and Goldin went on to receive a master's degree in engineering. Jane Lurie produced a short documentary about the takeover. She and fellow Fifth Street organizer Marizel Rios founded Labyris, the first feminist bookstore in New York City, where they coined the popular feminist slogan "the future is female."

June Arnold wrote a novel, The Cook and the Carpenter, about her experiences during the takeover. She changed the setting to her home state of Texas and invented a gender-neutral pronoun to critique gender stereotypes. When she was unable to find a publisher due to the experimental style, Arnold and her partner Parke Bowman founded Daughters, Inc., a feminist press that published works of feminist and lesbian fiction. In 1973, Daughters published The Cook and the Carpenter, which was dedicated to the Fifth Street Women's Building. The novel was reprinted in 1995 as part of New York University Press's Cutting Edge Lesbian Life and Literature series. Edited by Karla Jay, the Cutting Edge series aimed to highlight lesbian classics and bring attention to more obscure lesbian works. Through her work with Daughters, Arnold became a leader in the women in print movement and organized the Women in Print Conference, which sought to establish autonomous communications networks created by and for women.

== Bibliography ==
- Arnold, Roberta. "My Mother Was Many Things". Southern Lesbian Feminist Activist Herstory Project. Archived from the original on October 3, 2024.
- Arnold, Roberta; Arnold, Fairfax (2013). "Art Is Politics". Sinister Wisdom. 89: 34–48.
- Bikman, Minda (January 7, 1971). "New Year's on East 5th: Enter Through the Window". The Village Voice. p. 44. Archived from the original on June 9, 2026.
- Cowan, Liza (July 26, 2012). "Side Trip: The Fifth Street Women's Building Takeover: A Feminist Urban Action, January 1971". Dyke: A Quarterly. Archived from the original on December 5, 2024.
- Cowan, Liza (2025). "Fifth Street Women's Building Takeover Part 2". Dyke: A Quarterly.
- Eckert, Lora (January 29, 1971). "N.Y. women demonstrate for community center" (PDF). The Militant. Vol. 35, no. 3. p. 15. Archived from the original (PDF) on December 27, 2023.
- Enszer, Julie R. (2013). The Whole Naked Truth of Our Lives: Lesbian-Feminist Print Culture from 1969 through 1989 (PhD thesis). University of Maryland College Park.
- Fainstein, Norman I.; Fainstein, Susan S. (1974). Urban Political Movements: The Search for Power by Minority Groups in American Cities. Prentice Hall. ISBN 9780139393228.
- Harker, Jaime (2018). The Lesbian South: Southern Feminists, the Women in Print Movement, and the Queer Literary Canon. University of North Carolina Press. ISBN 9781469643359.
- Jay, Karla (1995). "Foreword". The Cook and the Carpenter. New York University Press. pp. xi–xiv. ISBN 9780814706282.
- "24 Arrested as Police End Feminist Demonstration". The New York Times. January 14, 1971.
- "Labyris". NYC LGBTQ Historic Sites Project. Archived from the original on March 31, 2026.
- Rat Subterranean News #18, January 12–29, 1971.
- Rat Subterranean News #19, February 3–20, 1971.
- Rat Subterranean News #20, March 2–23, 1971.
- Zimmerman, Bonnie (1995). "Introduction". The Cook and the Carpenter. New York University Press.
