= June Arnold =

American novelist and publisher

- Born: June Fairfax Davis; October 27, 1926; Greenville, South Carolina, U.S.
- Died: March 11, 1982 (aged 55); Houston, Texas, U.S.
- Education: Rice University
- Occupations: Writer, publisher
- Spouses: Gilbert Arnold (m. 1951; div. 1959) Sarel Eimerl (m. 1960; div. 1960)
- Partner: Parke Bowman
- Children: 5
- Writing career
- Language: English
- Genre: Novels
- Subjects: Women, Lesbian experience, Family
- Notable works: Sister Gin, Baby Houston

June Fairfax Arnold (née Davis; October 27, 1926 – March 11, 1982) was an American novelist, publisher, and lesbian feminist activist known for her novel Sister Gin and posthumous novel Baby Houston. Arnold cofounded the feminist press Daughters, Inc., which published experimental and avant-garde feminist literature, including her own novels The Cook and the Carpenter and Sister Gin. She was a leader in the women in print movement and organized the first national Women in Print Conference in 1976. Her novels are broadly considered important works of feminist, lesbian, and Southern literature.

== Early life and education ==
June Fairfax Davis was born on October 27, 1926, to Robert Cowan Davis and Catherine ("Cad") Carter Wortham in Greenville, South Carolina. Arnold grew up in Memphis, Tennessee until 1938, when the family moved to Houston, Texas after her father's death. She attended Kincaid School in Houston before transferring to Shipley in Bryn Mawr, Pennsylvania. Arnold came from a wealthy background and had a debutante ball.

From 1943 to 1944, Arnold studied at Vassar College. She received her bachelor's degree from the Rice Institute (now Rice University) in 1948. In 1953, she married Gilbert Arnold, a classmate at Rice. Arnold returned to Rice as a twenty-seven year old mother of three to study literature at the graduate level. She had two further children before completing her master's degree in 1958. Arnold divorced her husband in 1959 and her fourth child drowned in a swimming pool accident the following year.

Arnold married Sarel Eimerl in 1960 and moved her children to New York City, where she lived in Greenwich Village, taught English in Harlem, attended classes at the New School, and pursued a writing career. She divorced Eimerl within a year of their marriage.

== Career ==
While in New York, Arnold took up carpentry and became involved with the women's liberation and lesbian feminism movements by joining a consciousness raising group. She became an advocate for housing rights and participated in squatting protests along with her children. Arnold was a key organizer of the Fifth Street Women's Building Takeover in 1971, when over 200 women occupied an abandoned building owned by the city and established a daycare, feminist school, and food cooperative. Arnold wrote an experimental novel, The Cook and the Carpenter, based on her experience with the women's building takeover.

Despite the publication of her 1966 novel Applesauce, Arnold could not find a publisher for The Cook and the Carpenter. Partially inspired by Virginia Woolf's Hogarth Press, she and her partner Parke Bowman founded Daughters, Inc., an independent feminist publisher, in 1972. As a feminist separatist and lesbian feminist, Arnold believed that women should focus on building woman-centered communities and cultures, at least temporarily. The women in print movement was an international effort to establish autonomous communications networks of feminist writers, editors, printers, publishers, and booksellers. Daughters, Inc. published Arnold's novels The Cook and the Carpenter and Sister Gin, along with other feminist and lesbian works by Rita Mae Brown, Blanche McCrary Boyd, and Monique Wittig, among others.

While visiting feminist bookstores for her novel Sister Gin, Arnold was inspired to create a collaborative network of feminist publishers and printers. Along with Charlotte Bunch and Coletta Reid, both former members of the feminist separatist Furies Collective, Arnold organized the first Women in Print Conference in 1976. The conference allowed women in print activists to learn skills, share advice, coordinate movement work, and debate about how best to achieve their feminist goals. Unlike many other feminist presses in the women in print movement, which operated as anti-capitalist and non-hierarchical collectives, Arnold and Bowman ran Daughters as a traditional small family business. Because both founders came from wealthy backgrounds, they had the resources to offer their authors more traditional royalty contracts and advances.

Daughters, Inc. had unexpected success with Rita Mae Brown's novel Rubyfruit Jungle, which sold over 60,000 copies largely through word of mouth advertising. The novel, along with the Women in Print Conference, brought further attention to Arnold and Daughters. In 1977, Lois Gould wrote a profile on Daughters for The New York Times, in which Arnold, Bowman, Bunch, and others debated whether they should sell the reprint rights for Rubyfruit Jungle to a mainstream publisher. Arnold believed that women should be in control of their own writings and worried that traditional publishers would deradicalize the politics of feminist writings. Her statement that "women can afford to say no" to lucrative offers from the male-dominated publishing industry was criticized by working class feminists and writers who wanted their works to receive broader exposure. Brown herself was in favor of selling the reprint rights due to the financial stability it would provide her. After Daughters sold the reprint rights to Bantam Books for $250,000, Arnold and Daughters were widely criticized for "selling out" in feminist circles.

At the end of her life, Arnold was living in Houston and attempting to recreate her mother's life in order to write another experimental feminist novel. She died of cancer on March 11, 1982 before she finished the novel. It was later released posthumously in 1987 with the title Baby Houston.

== Writings ==
Arnold's literary influences included modernists such as Gertrude Stein, Djuna Barnes, and Virginia Woolf. She and other feminist writers sought to break away from the male-dominated literary status quo and invent experimental, woman-centered language and modes. In particular, Arnold believed that independent presses such as Daughters, Inc. should encourage experimentation and the development of a specifically lesbian and feminist avant-garde aesthetic. Some of these ideas were later embraced by feminists under the name écriture féminine. Arnold defined lesbian fiction as a collective form "developing away from plot-time via autobiography, confession, oral tradition into what might finally be a spiral. Experience weaving in upon itself, commenting on itself, inclusive, not ending in final victory/defeat but ending with the sense that the community continues."

Arnold's first novel, Applesauce, was published in 1966 by McGraw Hill. It portrayed a woman who, due to the pressure of traditional gender roles and several traumatic events, fractures her sense of self into multiple identities, including a male alter ego. Arnold's second novel, The Cook and the Carpenter, was published in 1973. In it, Arnold experimented with stream-of-consciousness narration in depicting a radical feminist commune, partially inspired by her participation in the Fifth Street Women's Takeover. Arnold published Sister Gin in 1975, a novel about Su, a 46-year-old woman whose carefully constructed life is beginning to fall apart. It is significant for depicting an intergenerational lesbian relationship and for being one of the first novels to include a detailed firsthand depiction of menopause.

Arnold's work deals with themes of traditional gender roles, marriage, polyamory, intentional communities, alcoholism, body image issues, feminine rage, menopause, and the intersections between political activism and personal relationships. Her novels are widely considered to be important works of lesbian, feminist, and Southern fiction.

In addition to her novels, Arnold also contributed essays and other short works to publications such as Sinister Wisdom, Village Voice and Sister Courage.

== List of publications ==
Arnold, June (1966). Applesauce. McGraw Hill.

—— (1973). The Cook and the Carpenter. Daughters, Inc.

—— (1975). Sister Gin. Daughters, Inc.

—— (1987). Baby Houston. Texas Monthly.
