= Such Good Friends =

1971 film by Otto Preminger

- Theatrical release film poster by Saul Bass
- Directed by: Otto Preminger
- Written by: Esther Dale
- Based on: Such Good Friends by Lois Gould
- Produced by: Otto Preminger
- Starring: Dyan Cannon; James Coco; Jennifer O'Neill; Ken Howard; Nina Foch; Laurence Luckinbill; Louise Lasser
- Cinematography: Gayne Rescher
- Edited by: Harry Howard
- Music by: Thomas Z. Shepard
- Production company: Otto Preminger Films
- Distributed by: Paramount Pictures
- Release date: December 21, 1971
- Running time: 102 minutes
- Country: United States
- Language: English

Such Good Friends is a 1971 American black comedy-drama film directed by Otto Preminger and starring Dyan Cannon, Ken Howard, James Coco, Jennifer O'Neill, and Laurence Luckinbill. The screenplay by Elaine May (credited under the pseudonym Esther Dale) is based on the novel of the same title by Lois Gould.

== Plot ==
Manhattanite Julie Messinger, a complacent housewife and mother of two raucous young sons Matthew and Nicky, is married to Richard, a chauvinistic and self-centered magazine art director and author of a best-selling children's book. When he falls into a coma during minor surgery to remove a nonmalignant mole on his neck, Julie learns from his doctor, Dr. Timmy Spector, that another surgeon nicked his artery, necessitating a blood transfusion to which he had a rare allergic reaction. The following day, Julie is told Richard has overcome the blood reaction, but his liver has sustained serious damage requiring immediate treatment. In quick succession, his other organs begin to fail.

While trying to comfort Julie, family friend Cal Whiting reveals that his girlfriend Miranda Graham has confessed to having an affair with Richard over the past year. Distressed by the news, Julie seeks advice from her egocentric mother Mrs. Wallman, but finds herself unable to discuss her husband's infidelity. She decides to confront Miranda and asks her what future she anticipated having with her husband. Miranda confesses that Richard and she are deeply in love and have discussed marriage, although thus far, she has been unable to make such a permanent commitment.

Julie begins to unravel emotionally. She visits Cal, whose attempted seduction of her fails due to impotence. At the hospital, she tells the unconscious Richard she will never divorce him and vows to ruin his reputation. Timmy invites her to his apartment for drinks and admits he was aware of Richard's affair, not only with Miranda, but with other women, as well, and kept them secret out of a sense of loyalty to his friend. Stunned and confused, Julie lashes out at Timmy, then seduces him, and he succumbs to her advances.

At home later that evening, Julie finds a black book in Richard's desk and realizes it contains coded data about his numerous extramarital affairs, many of them with her friends. She gives it to Cal, who then shows it to Miranda to prove she was just one of Richard's many conquests. The following day, Richard goes into cardiac arrest, and Julie realizes she wants him to survive despite his betrayal of her. When Timmy reports her husband has died, a grieving Julie takes her sons for a walk in Central Park to contemplate their future.

== Cast ==
- Dyan Cannon as Julie Messinger
- James Coco as Dr. Timmy Spector
- Jennifer O'Neill as Miranda Graham
- Ken Howard as Cal Whiting
- Nina Foch as Mrs. Wallman
- Laurence Luckinbill as Richard Messinger
- Louise Lasser as Marcy Berns
- Burgess Meredith as Bernard Kalman
- Sam Levene as Uncle Eddie
- William Redfield as Barney Halsted
- James Beard as Dr. Mahler
- Rita Gam as Doria Perkins
- Nancy Guild as Molly
- Michael Giordano III as Matthew Messinger
- Oscar Grossman as Doorman
- T.J. Hargrave as Nicky Messinger
- Elaine Joyce as Marian Spector
- Doris Roberts as Mrs. Gold
- Clarice Taylor as Mrs. McKay
- Lawrence Tierney as Guard
- Virginia Vestoff as Emily Lapham

== Production ==
Through his son Erik, who was working as his story editor, producer Otto Preminger heard about a manuscript by Lois Gould that was rumored to be a hot property. He negotiated with the author and purchased the film rights for $200,000 in February 1970, three months before the book was published.

The novel, narrated in stream-of-consciousness mode by Julie Messinger, proved to be difficult to adapt for the screen. Joan Micklin Silver initially tackled the project, but Preminger found her to be too much of a feminist, who was more psychologically attuned to the character than he thought was necessary. He then hired Joan Didion and John Gregory Dunne and worked with them for several months. Finally, in early 1971, Elaine May, his original choice for screenwriter, became available. May worked on the script for 10 weeks, although Preminger found adjusting to her method of writing to be difficult. The two would meet for a story conference, then May would disappear and remain incommunicado for two weeks or so, finally emerging with a substantial part of the screenplay completed. Preminger would give her notes and she would disappear again, and this routine continued until the script was finished. Not wanting her name attached to work created by others, May insisted she did not want screen credit and used the pseudonym Esther Dale, the name of a Hollywood character actress, instead of her own. Later, Preminger revealed May's involvement in the film to help promote it, a move that upset the screenwriter, as she felt Preminger was "more honorable than that."

Preminger and leading lady Dyan Cannon clashed throughout filming. She was constantly late, one of the director's pet peeves, and the two disagreed about everything about her character, from how she should be portrayed to how she should be dressed. Uncomfortable with the director's perception of Julie, the actress frequently tried to incorporate some of her own vision into her interpretation, resulting in loud, on-set arguments that left Cannon feeling alone, self-conscious, and very vulnerable. Upon the film's completion, the two made peace, but vowed never to work with each other again.

== Critical reception ==
The film earned mixed reviews at the time of its release, with some feeling it was better than most of the poorly received films Preminger made during the 1960s. Roger Ebert of the Chicago Sun-Times called the film "a hard, unsentimental, deeply cynical comedy" and "Preminger's best film in a long time, probably since Anatomy of a Murder in 1959." He added, "There are funny lines in the movie, but they are rarely allowed to be merely funny; they are also intended to hurt. People hurt and insult one another because, we sense, attack is the best form of defense inside this carnivorous society. Some of the dialog is in appallingly bad taste, and some of the critics have blamed the bad taste on Preminger, but it would have taken a lesser director to leave it out. The vulgarity belongs there because the movie is as tough as the people it's about."

A Time reviewer said, "The whole notion is so outrageously melodramatic that Preminger was probably right in choosing to play it for comedy . . . On second thought, Such Good Friends might have worked better the other way. Preminger is usually funnier — remember Hurry Sundown? — when he's trying to be serious."

Tony Mastroianni of the Cleveland Press called it "one of those sick-funny films that asks you to laugh at tragedy and gets away with it." He continued, "It undoubtedly will offend many and for a number of reasons. It has a brand of caustic wit that somehow surmounts situations that are a blend of soap opera maudlin and ribald coarseness. The picture takes on such institutions as marriage, medicine and friendship and treats them all pretty roughly. What succeeds is a barrage of bright, witty, trenchant lines written by Elaine May operating under the pseudonym of Esther Dale. Director Otto Preminger, whose recent films looked as though they were directed by an ax murderer, does a better job this time out. There are still scenes that are all surface, some that are just crudely done. But in others, notably those involving large groups of people, he works out an interplay of parts that results in fascinating moments of counterpoint."

Time Out London observed, "Sadly, Preminger seems unsure whether to take May's characters at face value or to feel for them. As a result, the cardboard emotions of Cannon ... and Coco ... are too often taken for real, and the script's brilliantly witty cameos are shunted too quickly out of sight."

TV Guide rated the film one star, saying it "aimed at being contemporary, but turned out contemptible. It does, however, provide a look at a tough-skinned New York lifestyle that Big Apple resident Preminger well understood."

Gene Siskel gave the film 3 1/2 out of 4 stars and called it "absolutely delightful."

== Awards and nominations ==
Cannon was nominated for the Golden Globe Award for Best Actress – Motion Picture Drama. Jane Fonda won the award for her performance in Klute at the 29th Golden Globe Awards.

== See also ==
- List of American films of 1971
