= Roger V. Gould =

Sociologist

Roger V. Gould (October 12, 1962 – April 29, 2002) was an American sociologist who emphasized the importance of basing theories upon research into actual events.

Gould was born Roger van Blerkom Benjamin in Brookline, Massachusetts and largely grew up in Manhattan. Gould was the son of two writers, both former journalists, Lois Gould and Philip Benjamin. Gould's adoptive father Robert E. Gould, M.D., whose name he took in 1967 following the death of his father, was a professor at New York Medical College.

Gould attended the Dalton School and earned bachelor's and doctoral degrees at Harvard University. Gould was a professor at the University of Chicago for a decade and then a professor at Yale University until his death at age 39. From 1997 to 2000 he served as the editor of The American Journal of Sociology. Gould's work Insurgent Identities: Class, Community and Protest in Paris from 1848 to the Commune (Univ. of Chicago, 1995) was noted for its building its case on a study of the archives which led to a rejection of the class theory of the 1871 Paris revolution. Gould also wrote Collision of Wills: How Ambiguity About Social Rank Breeds Conflict (Univ. of Chicago 2003) which was published posthumously. In the book Gould developed theory of how status ambiguity fosters the emergence of conflict. Since then the theory has been examined and tested empirically. Gould also contributed to anthologies of social scientific methods.

Gould died of leukemia. He was survived by his wife, Erin Graves, and a brother, Anthony Gould.

== Sources ==
- New York Times Obituary, May 4, 2002
- ad for Gould's book
- James Mahoney and Dietrich Rueschemeyer. Comparative Historical Analysis in the Social Sciences. p. 241-269 is an article by Gould but his work is mentioned elsewhere in the volume as well.
