= Jo Copeland =

American fashion designer (1899–1982)

- Born: 28 February 1898; New York, New York, US
- Died: March 20, 1982 (aged 84); New York, New York, US
- Education: Parsons School of Design
- Occupation: Fashion designer
- Spouse: Edward J. Regensburg Jr.
- Children: 2, including Lois Gould
- Awards: Neiman Marcus Fashion Award

Jo Copeland (28 February 1898 – March 20, 1982) was an American fashion designer. She received the Neiman Marcus Fashion Award in 1944.

== Early life and education ==
The daughter of Samuel and Minna Copeland, Josephine "Jo" Copeland was born in New York City on 28 February 1898. Her mother died during childbirth. Copeland was educated in New York at Parsons School of Design and Art Students League of New York.

== Career ==
After graduating from the Parsons School of Design, she began working as a designer which paid enough to help put her older brothers through Harvard Law School. Copeland began selling her own designs as a commercial artist to manufacturing firms and was hired by Pattulo Models Inc in 1920 as a fashion illustrator.

After World War II led to the liberation of Paris, Copeland began looking at other sources of inspiration for fashion including China and South America. She also persuaded other American fashion designers to become independent from Paris' influence. Copeland was so determined to not be influenced by Paris that she refused to travel to the city after 1947. By 1949, she was promoted to partner at the firm Pattulo Models Inc and eventually became Vice-President and Head Designer at Pattulo-Jo Copeland Inc. where she earned a reputation for refusing to conform to typical fashion norms.

Copeland designed the buttoned, two-piece suit for women to wear without a blouse. She rejected the Mod style as desperation to be noticed and a sign of immaturity. As a result, many of her designs incorporated an extended torso and skirts no shorter than two inches above the knee. She received the 1944 Neiman Marcus Fashion Award for her designs.

Copeland died on March 20, 1982, from a stroke. A collection of her designs is on display at the Metropolitan Museum of Art.
