= The Standard, East Village =

Hotel in Manhattan, New York

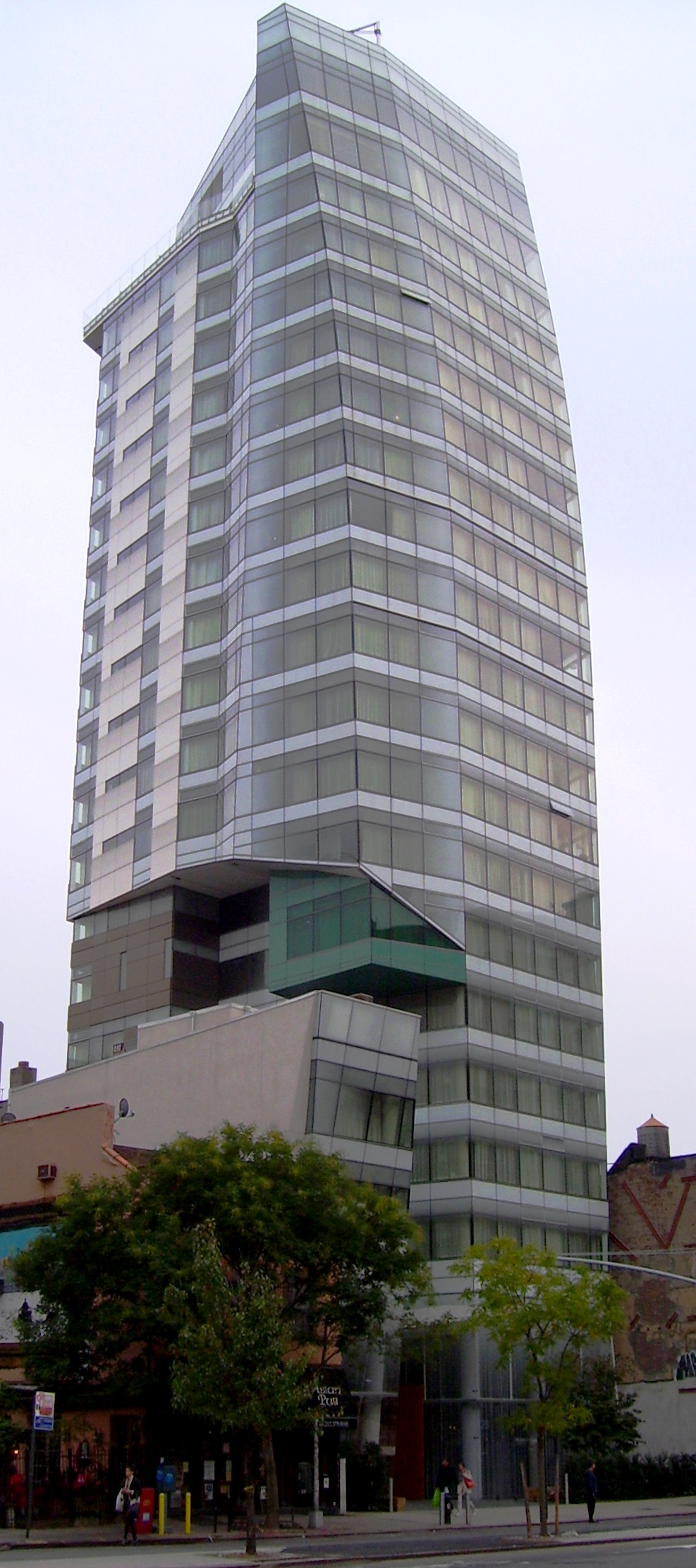
- The Cooper Square Hotel in 2010
- Interactive map of the The Standard, East Village area
- Former names: Cooper Square Hotel

General information
- Location: 25 Cooper Square, Lower Manhattan, New York City
- Coordinates: 40.727905°N 73.990785°W
- Opening: December 2008
- Operator: Standard Hotels

Technical details
- Floor count: 21

Design and construction
- Architect: Carlos Zapata Studio

Other information
- Number of rooms: 145

Website
- standardhotels.com/east-village

The Standard, East Village, formerly the Cooper Square Hotel, is a 21-story high-rise luxury hotel located at 25 Cooper Square in Lower Manhattan, New York City. The tower was designed by Carlos Zapata Studio and structurally engineered by Leslie E. Robertson Associates. It has interiors by the Milanese designer Antonio Citterio. The hotel, which opened in December 2008, has 145 rooms and is the location of the Narcissa restaurant owned by André Balazs and Chef John Fraser.

The Cooper Square Hotel became a Standard Hotel in 2011, and as of 2013 is undergoing renovations.
