= Bertha Harris =

American novelist and activist

- Born: Bertha Anne Harris; December 17, 1937; Fayetteville, North Carolina, US
- Died: May 22, 2005 (aged 67); New York City, US
- Writing career
- Genre: Lesbian fiction
- Notable work: Lover (1976)

Bertha Anne Harris (December 17, 1937 – May 22, 2005) was an American novelist.

== Personal life ==
Harris was born in Fayetteville, North Carolina, on December 17, 1937, to John Holmes Harris and Mary Zeleka Jones.

In 1959, Harris graduated from the Women's College of University of North Carolina. Upon graduation, she moved to New York City at age twenty-two, spending her summers in Westport, Massachusetts. She stated that she wanted to live in New York "to find lesbians," but ended up in a brief heterosexual marriage and had a daughter, Jennifer Harris Wyland. To support herself and her daughter, she worked as an editor and proofreader for a time, before returning to North Carolina to receive her M.F.A.

Harris returned to New York by at least 1984.

She died at age 67, on May 22, 2005, in New York City.

== Career ==
Harris began her career as she was completing her M.F.A. in North Carolina. As part of her degree requirements, she wrote what would end up being her first novel, Catching Saradove, published in 1969. The novel is a work of semi-autobiographical fiction.

From 1969–1972, Harris was a professor at East Carolina University and at the University of North Carolina at Charlotte. She was later the director of Women's Studies and a professor of Performing and Creative Arts at the College of Staten Island.

Her interests in music, particularly opera, as well as in the Southern United States, inform her second novel, Confessions of Cherubino, published in 1972. However, she is most well known for her third novel, Lover, published in 1976 by Daughters, Inc., a lesbian feminist independent publisher. Harris said she wrote it "straight from the libido, while I was madly in love, and liberated by the lesbian cultural movement of the mid-1970s."

In all three of Harris' novels, she engages the aesthetics of late twentieth-century literature; they have been considered examples of literary postmodernism. Her novels are stylistically akin to the work of modernist authors as Virginia Woolf, Gertrude Stein, and Djuna Barnes (whom Harris greatly admired). Much of Harris's work, most notably Lover, is written with the women's movement of the 1970s as its primary inspiration and its audience. Lover has been viewed as a literary forebear of queer theory.

Harris co-authored The Joy of Lesbian Sex in 1977 with Emily L. Sisley. Lover was reissued in 1993 by the New York University Press with a preface by Karla Jay and a new introduction by the author, mainly recounting her involvement with Daughters Press and its owners, June Arnold and Parke Bowman.

At the time of her death she was completing her fourth novel, a comedy, Mi Contra Fa.

The Bertha Harris Women's Center at the College of Staten Island is named after Harris.

== Selected works ==
- Catching Saradove (1969)
- Confessions of Cherubino (1972)
- Lover (1976)
