= Daughters, Inc. =

American publishing house, 1972–1979

- Status: Ceased Operations
- Founded: 1972
- Founder: June Arnold and Parke Bowman
- Defunct: 1979; 47 years ago
- Country of origin: United States
- Headquarters location: Plainfield, Vermont
- Publication types: Books
- Fiction genres: Lesbian fiction, feminist fiction

Daughters, Incorporated, or Daughters, Inc., was an American feminist publishing house founded in Plainfield, Vermont by June Arnold and Parke "Patty" Bowman in 1972. Daughters, Inc. primarily published works of feminist and lesbian fiction. The press was significant in feminist separatism and the women in print movement, an international effort by second-wave feminists to establish alternative communications networks of publishers, printers, and bookstores created by and for women.

== Origins and founding ==
June Arnold founded Daughters, Inc. with her partner Parke Bowman after she could not find a publisher for her experimental novel The Cook and the Carpenter, which told a fictionalized version of the Fifth Street Women's Building Takeover. She was partially inspired by Virginia Woolf's Hogarth Press, which allowed her to print her own books without editorial or publisher interference.

Arnold and Bowman were also influenced by lesbian feminism and feminist separatism, which sought to create separatist woman-centered communities and cultures. Arnold joined a consciousness-raising group during the early women's liberation movement and wanted to create modes of literary production, publication, and distribution that did not rely on men or the mainstream publishing establishment. Arnold called the mainstream press the "finishing press" because she believed their goal was to "finish" the women's liberation movement. Other feminist separatists became involved with Daughters, Inc., including Blanche McCrary Boyd, who was living in a nearby Vermont commune, Bertha Harris, and Charlotte Bunch of the Furies Collective.

Daughters, Inc. was influential in the burgeoning women in print movement, an international effort by second-wave feminists to establish autonomous communications networks of feminist publishers, printers, and bookstores created by and for women. Arnold organized the Women in Print Conference in 1976, which brought together women involved in woman-only publishing enterprises. The conference brought national attention to Daughters and Arnold, including a profile in The New York Times.

== History ==
Unlike many other feminist presses in the women in print movement, Daughters was well-resourced because Arnold and Bowman came from wealthy backgrounds. Arnold and Bowman also rejected the communal model of publishing that was becoming popular at other feminist presses, with non-hierarchical structures, collective decision making, and rougher production quality from using amateur women printers. In contrast, Daughters paid for professional printing and provided their writers with more traditional agreements involving royalties and advances. There were sometimes tensions between the two founders, as Bowman wanted to "run Daughters as if it were Random House," whereas Arnold was more motivated by her ideological commitment to feminism and belief in the literary merits of experimental feminist texts.

Daughters attempted to create an avant-garde, experimental lesbian aesthetic in contrast to mass-market and lesbian pulp fiction titles. Once again influenced by modernists like Virginia Woolf, Gertrude Stein, and Djuna Barnes, Arnold believed that a new, alternative form of feminist language was required. The press published some of the most influential experimental novels of the 1970s, including a translation of The Opoponax by Monique Wittig. These ideas were later fully embraced under the label of écriture féminine and feminist avantgarde.

The press marketed and distributed their own books. They created catalogs and took out advertisements in lesbian and feminist periodicals. Daughters also published excerpts of their novels in the feminist journal Amazon Quarterly and organized readings at feminist bookstores. After initially using a male printer and shipping books through the United States Postal Service, the press shifted to using female-operated presses and a woman-owned distribution company.

Daughters, Inc. had unexpected success with Rita Mae Brown's novel Rubyfruit Jungle, which sold over 60,000 copies largely through word of mouth advertising. The novel, along with the Women in Print Conference, brought further attention to Arnold and Daughters. In 1977, Lois Gould wrote a profile on Daughters for The New York Times, in which Arnold, Bowman, Bunch, and others debated whether they should sell the reprint rights for Rubyfruit Jungle to a mainstream publisher. Arnold believed that women should be in control of their own writings and worried that traditional publishers would deradicalize the politics of feminist writings. The publisher of Arnold's first novel Applesauce forced her to censor some of the book's language, changing "cunt" to "vagina" and "fuck" to "screw."

Arnold's subsequent statement that "women can afford to say no" to lucrative offers from the male-dominated publishing industry was criticized by working class feminists and writers who wanted their works to receive broader exposure. Brown herself was in favor of selling the reprint rights due to the financial stability it would provide her. After Daughters sold the reprint rights to Bantam Books for $250,000, Arnold and Daughters were widely criticized for "selling out" in feminist circles.

Arnold and Bowman's relationship suffered from frequent disagreements about the business. In 1975, Arnold ceded control of the business operations to Bowman. Bowman moved the Daughters headquarters to New York City. In 1978, the couple moved to Houston, Texas and Bowman incorporated Daughters, Inc. in Texas under her name. The press closed in 1979.

== List of publications ==
- Early Losses by Pat Burch (1973)
- Nerves by Blanche McCrary Boyd (1973)
- The Cook and the Carpenter by June Arnold (1973)
- Rubyfruit Jungle by Rita Mae Brown (1973)
- The Treasure by Selma Lagerlöf (1973, reprint)
- Riverfinger Woman by Elana Dykewomon (1974)
- Daughters in High School by Frieda Singer (1974)
- A True Story of a Drunken Mother by Nancy Lee Hall (1974)
- Sister Gin by June Arnold (1975)
- Born to Struggle by May Hobbs (1975)
- The Pumpkin Eater by Penelope Mortimer (1975, reprint)
- Happenthing in Travel On by Carole Spearin McCauley (1975)
- In Her Day by Rita Mae Brown (1976)
- Lover by Bertha Harris (1976)
- The Opoponax by Monique Wittig (1976, reprint)
- You Can Have It When I'm Done With It by Betty Webb Mace (1976)
- Applesauce by June Arnold (1977, reprint)
- Angel Dance by Mary F. Beal (1977)
- I Must Not Rock by Linda Marie (1977)
- X: A Fabulous Child's Story by Lois Gould (1978)
- Kittatinny by Joanna Russ (1978)
- Shedding by Verena Stefan (1978)
- Confessions of a Cherubino by Bertha Harris (1978, reprint)

== Bibliography ==
- Adams, Kate (1998). "Built Out of Books: Lesbian Energy and Feminist Ideology in Alternative Publishing". Journal of Homosexuality. 34 (3–4): 113–141. doi:10.1300/J082v34n03_07.
- Arnold, June (1976). "Feminist Presses and Feminist Politics". Quest. 3 (1).
- Arnold, Roberta; Arnold, Fairfax (2013). "Art Is Politics". Sinister Wisdom. 89: 34-48.
- Enszer, Julie R. (2015). "'What Made Us Think They'd Pay Us for Making a Revolution?': Women in Distribution (WinD), 1974-1979". In Harker, Jaime; Farr, Cecilia Konchar (eds.). This Book Is an Action: Feminist Print Culture and Activist Aesthetics. University of Illinois Press. pp. 66–86. ISBN 9780252039805.
- Gilley, Jennifer (2015). "Feminist Publishing/Publishing Feminism: Experimentation in Second-Wave Book Publishing". In Harker, Jaime; Farr, Cecilia Konchar (eds.). This Book Is an Action: Feminist Print Culture and Activist Aesthetics. University of Illinois Press. pp. 23–45. ISBN 9780252039805.
- Gould, Lois (January 2, 1977). "Creating a Women's World". The New York Times. Archived from the original on February 20, 2025.
- Harker, Jaime (2018). The Lesbian South: Southern Feminists, the Women in Print Movement, and the Queer Literary Canon. University of North Carolina Press. ISBN 9781469643359.
- Harker, Jaime; Farr, Cecilia Konchar (2015). "Introduction". In Harker, Jaime; Farr, Cecilia Konchar (eds.). This Book Is an Action: Feminist Print Culture and Activist Aesthetics. University of Illinois Press. pp. 23–45. ISBN 9780252039805.
- Klinger, Alisa (1995). Paper Uprisings: Print Activism in the Multicultural Lesbian Movement (PhD thesis). University of California Berkeley.
- "Daughters, Inc". Lesbian Poetry Archive. Archived from the original on March 12, 2026.
- Tilchen, Maida (April 10, 1982). "June Arnold Dies of Cancer". Gay Community News. Vol. 9, no. 37.
- Travis, Trysh (2008). "The Women in Print Movement: History and Implications". Book History. 11 (1): 275–300. doi:10.1353/bh.0.0001.
