= Robert E. Gould =

Robert Emery Gould (March 20, 1924 – February 25, 1998) was clinical professor of psychiatry at New York Medical College, and chief of adolescent services at Bellevue Hospital. Gould was known as outspoken advocate on social issues, including psychiatric treatment of homeless people, violence on television (he was the president of lobbying group National Coalition on Television Violence), homosexuality and AIDS. Gould successfully advocated removing homosexuality from the list of pathologies in the American Psychiatric Association treatment manual, but an article he wrote in Cosmopolitan in January 1988 claiming that women faced little risk of HIV infection through vaginal intercourse courted controversy. The Chicago Tribune summarized: "There's almost no danger of getting AIDS from ordinary sexual intercourse, and the irrational fear of AIDS that stifles guilt-free enjoyment of sex may prove more destructive in the long run than the AIDS virus itself, Dr. Robert E. Gould, a professor of psychiatry and of obstetrics and gynecology at New York Medical College, said in the January Cosmopolitan. His controversial message has drawn the indignant wrath of several leading AIDS experts."

Gould was born and died in New York City. His wife, Lois Gould, who died in 2002 aged 70, was a bestselling novelist. They had two sons, Anthony and Roger.

Prior to working at New York Medical College, Gould had been a professor at New York University's medical school and also a lecturer at Fordham University.

Gould grew up in New York City, largely with his Hungarian-immigrant grandparents. He attended Williams College before graduating from the University of Maryland. He earned his MD at University of Virginia Medical School. Gould was trained as a psychoanalyst at William Alanson White Psychiatric Institute in New York City.

Gould was involved in 1987 in successfully working with the American Civil Liberties Union in overturning the involuntary hospitalization of Joyce Brown.
