= X: A Fabulous Child's Story =

1978 picture book by Lois Gould

- The picture book's cover
- Author: Lois Gould
- Illustrator: Jacqueline Chwast
- Language: English
- Genre: Children's literature; feminist science fiction
- Publisher: Ms. (short story); Daughters, Inc. (picture book)
- Publication date: December 1972 (short story); July 18, 1978 (picture book)
- Publication place: United States
- Media type: Print (hardcover)
- Pages: 52
- ISBN: 9780913780213
- OCLC: 4499675

X: A Fabulous Child's Story, written by Lois Gould, was first published as a short story in the magazine Ms. in 1972 and republished by Daughters, Inc. as a picture book in 1978 with illustrations by Jacqueline Chwast. The book tells the story of X, a child raised as part of an experiment to keep its (Note: The text of the story refers to X using it as a gender-neutral third-person pronoun.) gender unknown to everyone but its parents and the scientists conducting the experiment.

X: A Fabulous Child's Story received praise for its thought-provoking conceit and witty prose. Meanwhile, some writers have questioned the extent to which the story successfully challenges gender roles. X: A Fabulous Child's Story is sometimes considered a precursor to later picture books about transgender characters, and it has been anthologized several times. The story inspired a 1975 experiment and was adapted into an animated short film in 2016.

== Plot ==
As part of a scientific experiment, a baby is born and its gender is kept a secret from the world. This child, Baby X, is adopted by Ms. and Mr. Jones, who promise to raise the child without imbuing it with traditional gender roles. The Joneses raise X by mixing toys and clothes meant for both girls and boys. When X begins school, its classmates try to determine X's gender but are unable to do so. X excels in all areas of its schooling and remains kind and caring to classmates, ultimately leading them to begin rejecting normative gender roles as well.

The parents of X's schoolmates become concerned and forbid them from playing with X. At a meeting of the Parents' Association, they decide X must be examined by an impartial group of experts. Upon examination, the experts announce that X is perfectly healthy and well-adjusted, and that its gender will be known one day. The Parents' Association reluctantly abides by the determination of the experts and allows their children once more to play with X. The children go to visit X later on and find it playing with its new baby sibling, Y.

== Publication ==
Lois Gould was a journalist and author who had written one novel, Such Good Friends, in 1970. In 1972, the feminist magazine Ms. began its print run. In December 1972 Ms. published Gould's short story "X: A Fabulous Child's Story" in the Stories for Free Children column in its sixth issue. The story was revised, illustrated, and republished by Daughters, Inc. as a 52-page hardcover picture book on July 18, 1978. The artwork was done by Jacqueline Chwast, a freelance visual artist who was known for an illustration style evoking woodcut but that in actuality employed negative space cut from black construction paper. Gould knew of Chwast's artwork and hoped she would illustrate X: A Fabulous Child's Story. Interested in the themes of the story, Chwast agreed to do the illustrations after Gould contacted her.

== Reception ==
Reviewing the work for The Village Voice, Eliot Fremont-Smith found X: A Fabulous Child's Story to offer "a fable of possibility" supporting "the courage to be oneself and acceptance of individual eccentricity" and wrote that the story's conclusion was "a rather nice verbal joke–with just a whiff of cloning". Publishers Weekly gave the story a positive review, describing the book as "witty, innovative, and sophisticated" and likely to stimulate discussion. The educator Roseanne Hoefel praised Gould's prose and humor for their "keen wit and energy" and described the story as popular among college students in her classes. The English and gender studies professor Nat Hurley praised the book for declining to reveal X's gender to the reader and allowing X to simply exist as ambiguously gendered. Fremont-Smith also described the work as both condescending and authoritarian for the way the story treated the viewpoints of the other parents and the other schoolchildren. He described Chwast's illustrations as "only occasionally ominous".

Some writers have been critical of the extent to which X: A Fabulous Child's Story actually challenges gender roles. Fremont-Smith wrote that the affluence of the Joneses and their ability to provide all the toys X desires suggest that sexual liberation and capitalism are compatible with one another. Jennifer Miller, an English lecturer, described the determination of X's sex via what was presumably a genital examination by the experts as dating the story "by capitulating to the idea that the truth of sex is located on the body". Miller also said that the use of it pronouns for X was a product of an outdated understanding of gender, and might be problematic to modern audiences. Hurley wrote that the determination of the experts that X was well-adjusted "does not force any of the resistant parents to change a single thing about their own rigidly gendered child-rearing practices". The language scholar Paramita Ayuningtyas described the ending of the story as ironic, with the introduction of X's sibling Y suggesting a binary XY sex-determination system that reifies gender essentialism.

== Legacy ==
Some scholars of children's literature consider X: A Fabulous Child's Story to be part of the lineage of modern children's books with transgender themes, even though the story does not explicitly deal with transgender identity. While Fremont-Smith wrote in his 1978 review of the book that Chwast illustrated X wearing exclusively overalls "to avoid the taint of transsexualism or campy drag", Jamie Campbell Naidoo wrote in 2012 that X: A Fabulous Child's Story may be a precursor to newer works which do feature explicitly transgender children, like Marcus Ewert's 10,000 Dresses. Similarly, Julia L. Mickenberg and Philip Nel described X: A Fabulous Child's Story as the first picture book that was sympathetic to trans people while Robert Bittner, Jennifer Ingrey, and Christine Stamper wrote that it was the first picture book to include a non-gendered child as one of its characters.

X: A Fabulous Child's Story was Gould's only story for children. The story has variously been anthologized as radical children's literature and as feminist science fiction, and has also been collected in social psychology and gender studies readers. The story partially inspired an experiment by three City University of New York researchers to test the effects of introducing an infant to adults without identifying its gender; their work was reported in the journal Sex Roles in 1975. X: A Fabulous Child's Story has been reported to be difficult to find copies of in the 2010s.

== Adaptation ==
In 2016, the picture book was adapted into an animated short film entitled Baby X and directed by Brendan Bradley. The 11-minute film received praise from Joe Blevins of The A.V. Club who wrote that its animation style succeeded in mimicking the visual style of its source text, and from Kristina Marusic of NewNowNext, who described it as "both beautiful and poignant".

== See also ==
- Chick the Cherub
