= Rubyfruit Jungle =

1973 debut novel by Rita Mae Brown

- First edition cover
- Author: Rita Mae Brown
- Language: English
- Genre: Novel
- Publisher: Daughters, Inc.
- Publication date: late 1973
- Publication place: United States
- Media type: Print (hardback & paperback)

Rubyfruit Jungle is the first novel by Rita Mae Brown. Published by the feminist press Daughters, Inc. in 1973, it was remarkable in its day for its explicit portrayal of lesbianism. The novel is a coming-of-age autobiographical account of Brown's youth and emergence as a lesbian author. The term "rubyfruit jungle" is a term used in the novel for the female genitals.

== Plot summary ==
The novel focuses on Molly Bolt, the adopted daughter of a poor family, who possesses remarkable beauty and who is aware of her lesbianism from early childhood. Her relationship with her mother is rocky, and at a young age her mother, referred to as "Carrie", informs Molly that she is not her own biological child but a "bastard". Molly has her first same-sex sexual relationship in the sixth grade with her girlfriend Leota B. Bisland, and then again in a Florida high school, where she has another sexual relationship with another friend, the school's head cheerleader Carolyn Simpson, who willingly has sex with Molly but rejects the "lesbian" label. Molly also engages in sex with males, including her cousin Leroy when the two were younger. Her father, Carl, dies when she is in her junior year of high school.

Molly pushes herself to excel in high school, winning a full scholarship to the University of Florida. However, when Molly's relationship with her alcoholic roommate is discovered, she is put into their psychiatric ward and denied a renewal of her scholarship. Possessing little money, she hitchhikes to New York to pursue an education in filmmaking.

In New York, Molly has her first experiences in lesbian communities. She is critical of most of the circles she meets and, as she always has done, continues to define herself and go down her own path.

Molly appears to notice environmental differences between the countryside and the city, and she also notices similarities of American culture-at-large.

At film school, she continues to observe and ignore the heterosexual culture that appears to saturate the world around her.

Molly takes a trip home to have her mother Carrie star in her short documentary that will be her final project for her film degree. After a quiet but successful graduation from film school, Molly runs into all of the roadblocks she expected to in looking for a job in her field. She is offered secretary jobs. She does not take any of the jobs and states that if it takes her until she's 50 years old then so be it.

Upon reaching New York, she realizes that the rubyfruit is possibly not as delicious and varied as she had dreamed within the concrete jungle.

== Publication history ==
The first edition was published by Daughters, Inc., a feminist publisher, in 1973. Daughters and its founder June Arnold were associated with the women in print movement, which sought to establish autonomous communications networks of feminist periodicals, presses, and bookstores created by and for women. Daughters, Inc. was run entirely by women writers, editors, and printers. Rubyfruit Jungle was an immediate success, selling 60,000 copies in two years largely due to word-of-mouth recommendations. The 1976 Women in Print Conference brought further attention to Daughters, Inc. Arnold was a feminist separatist and vowed that she would not do business with the mainstream press, which she believed would taint the cause of women's liberation. However, shortly after an interview with The New York Times in which she declared that she would not sell reprint rights to non-feminist publishers, Arnold sold the reprint rights to Rubyfruit Jungle to Bantam Books for $250,000. Brown supported the sale because of the financial stability the deal brought her, but Arnold and Daughters, Inc. were criticized in many feminist outlets.

== Literary significance and criticism ==
This work is notable for being an early literary lesbian novel. Many lesbian readers have found in it a reflection of their own experiences and observations. While some refer to it as "just another lesbian coming of age novel", its success is part of why the genre is now often considered a cliché. However, the book was criticized by psychological theorist David Halperin, who considered its savage ridiculing of butch culture to be heteronormative. In 2015, Rita Mae Brown was awarded the Lee Lynch Classic Book Award from the Golden Crown Literary Society for Rubyfruit Jungle.

== Reception ==
A 1977 review reported that since the book's 1973 release it has remained popular.

In an interview at the 2015 republishing of the book, Brown remarked that the book was an immediate success at the time of its publication.

== In popular culture ==
A copy of the novel can be seen on Trish's nightstand in The Slumber Party Massacre, for which author Rita Mae Brown wrote the screenplay.

The book was mentioned and was later being read from in the movie, The Incredibly True Adventure of Two Girls in Love, as it was suggested by one of the protagonist's friends for her to read.

The titular character of Educating Rita, whose real name is Susan, adopts the name Rita after reading the book.

One of the titular characters of Billie & Emma owns a copy of the book and is seen reading it throughout the film, to the discomfort of her aunt with whom she lives, and discusses with her love interest how it makes her feel less alone.

The Team Dresch song Musical Fanzine about the LGBTQ+ representation the band members wished they had seen as children includes the lyrics "You can find what you need / Maybe it's finding a very secret place / To hide your copy of Rubyfruit Jungle / Maybe you're writing your own"
