= Cooper Square =

Square in Manhattan, New York

Coordinates: 40°43′43″N 73°59′26″W

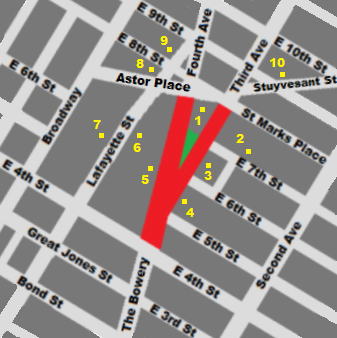
A map of Cooper Square (in red), showing some locations of interest in the area: 1. Cooper Union Foundation Building; 2. McSorley's Old Ale House; 3. Cooper Union New Academic Building; 4. Cooper Square Hotel; 5. Village Voice; 6. Public Theater (Astor Library); 7. Colonnade Row / Astor Place Theatre (Blue Man Group); 8. Clinton Hall (site of the Astor Opera House); 9. KMart (Wanamaker Department Store Annex) (permanently closed as of 2021); 10. Hamilton Fish House

Cooper Square is a junction of streets in Lower Manhattan in New York City located at the confluence of the neighborhoods of Bowery to the south, NoHo to the west and southwest, Greenwich Village to the west and northwest, the East Village to the north and east, and the Lower East Side to the southeast.

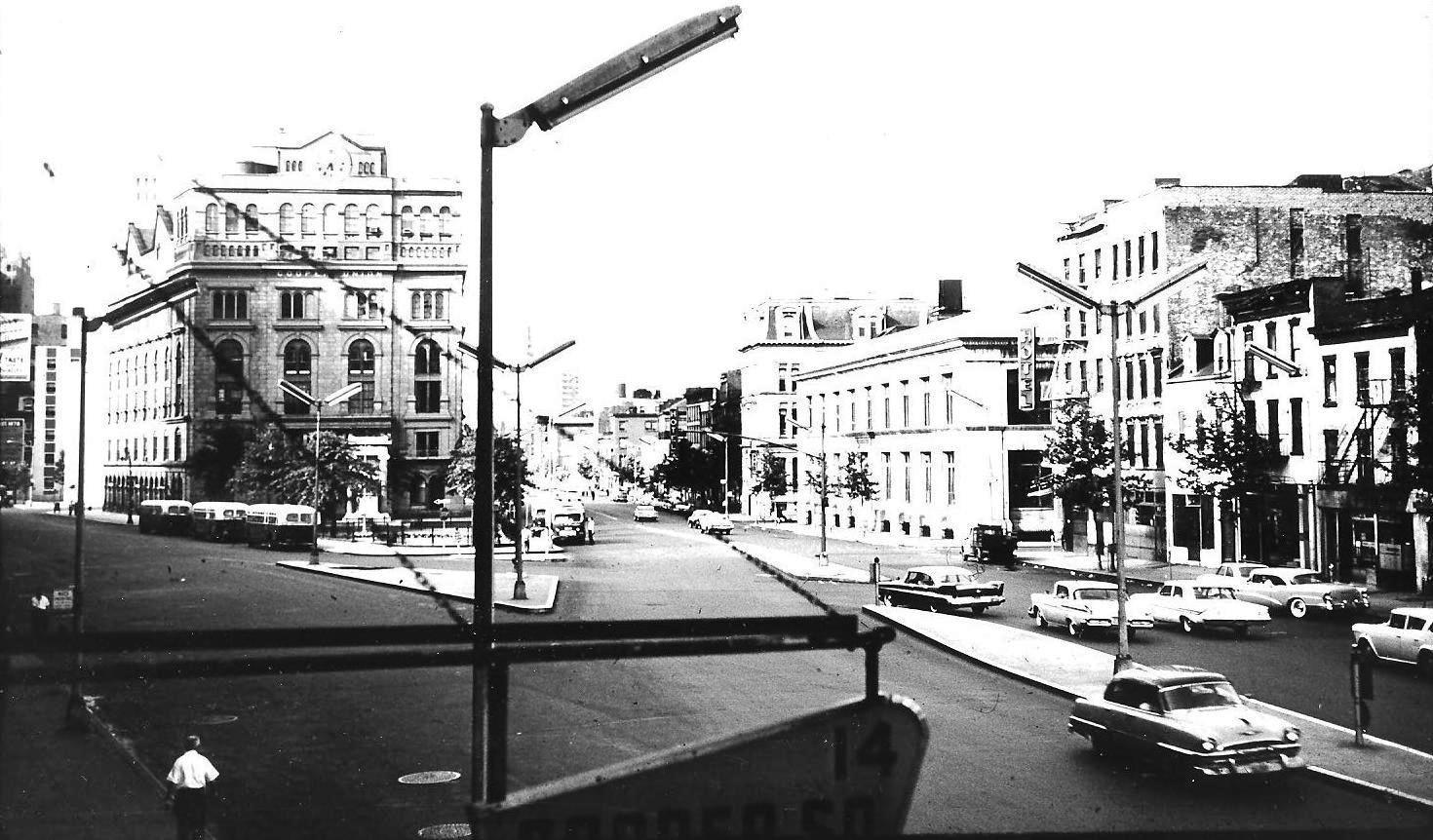
Cooper Square looking uptown in 1957

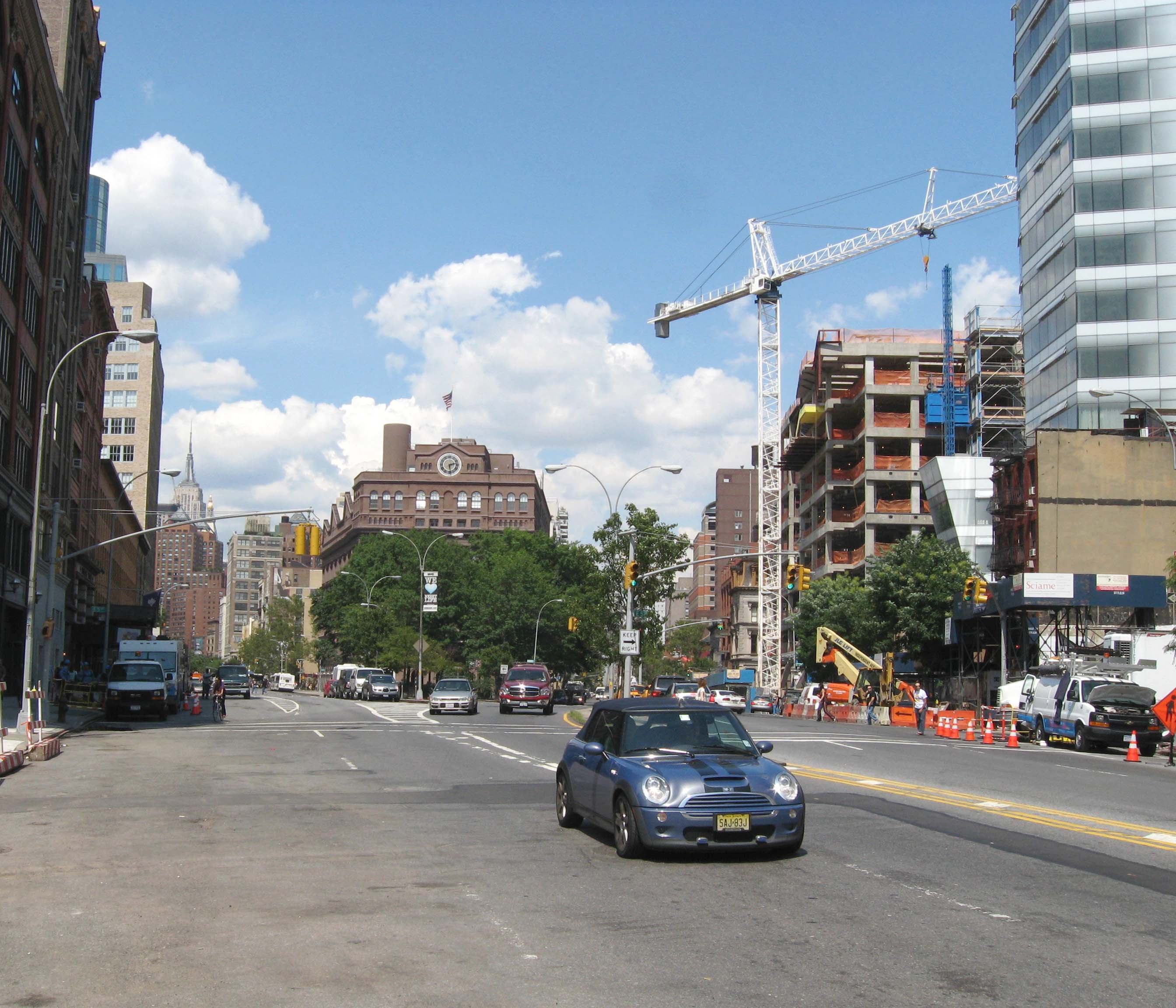
Cooper Square looking uptown in 2008

== Description ==
Beginning at its southern end where the Bowery crosses East 4th Street, the road then splits in two, both with Cooper Square addresses, until they cross Astor Place between East 8th Street and St. Marks Place and become Fourth Avenue (the western street) and Third Avenue (the eastern street).

Prior to the 2014-2016 redesign of the area, the intersection was difficult for pedestrians to navigate. Bowery, Third Avenue and both sides of Cooper Square were two-way streets, and the area was part of a city-approved through-truck route. The New York City Department of Transportation announced plans in 2009 to "normalize" traffic, increase the size of the park in the middle of the square, and create a new community park in the area. The redesign was completed in 2016. Lafayette Street, Cooper Square, and Fourth Avenue were converted to one-way streets with reduced lanes, and the park in the intersection was expanded.

== History ==
When the square was initially opened as a public space in 1850, it was named "Stuyvesant Square", despite there already being a "Stuyvesant Square" about a half-mile north on Second Avenue. It was renamed for Peter Cooper, the 19th Century industrialist and philanthropist, after his death in 1883. In 1853, Cooper had broken ground for Cooper Union for the Advancement of Science and Art, an institution founded on the belief that high-quality education should be available to all who qualified, including women – a radical notion at the time – without cost. It continued to provide every student with a full-tuition scholarship until 2014. Frederick A. Peterson's Cooper Union Foundation Building on the north end of the square, the oldest existing American building framed with steel beams, still stands where it was located when it opened in 1859, but the interior was extensively reconstructed in 1975 not only to modernize it, but also to fulfill one of Cooper's plans which was never realized at the time: the installation of a round elevator. The exterior of the building was restored in 1999 as well.

Downtown of the Foundation Building is a small park, Cooper Triangle, which includes a monument dedicated to Peter Cooper. Across the street, at 41 Cooper Square, is the school's newest building, the New Academic Building, designed by Thom Mayne of Morphosis.

The Village Voice's old headquarters are on the western side of the square, as are classroom buildings of Grace Church School and Kaplan, Inc. The sleek, modern high-rise Cooper Square Hotel at 25 is one of the newest buildings on the square.

The New York City Department of Transportation's "Reconstruction of Astor Place and Cooper Square" plan calls for some changes to be made to Cooper Square beginning in 2013. The western leg of the square will be a northbound bus-only lane, from a two-way multi-use roadway. The confusing intersection of the two legs at Fifth Street would become a simple "Village Plaza", with sidewalk extensions and a small amphitheater on the western sidewalk. Finally, Cooper Triangle would be renovated, and expanded to make a new "Cooper Walk" leading up to Cooper Union. New trees would be planted up and down the square on both sides.

== Gallery ==
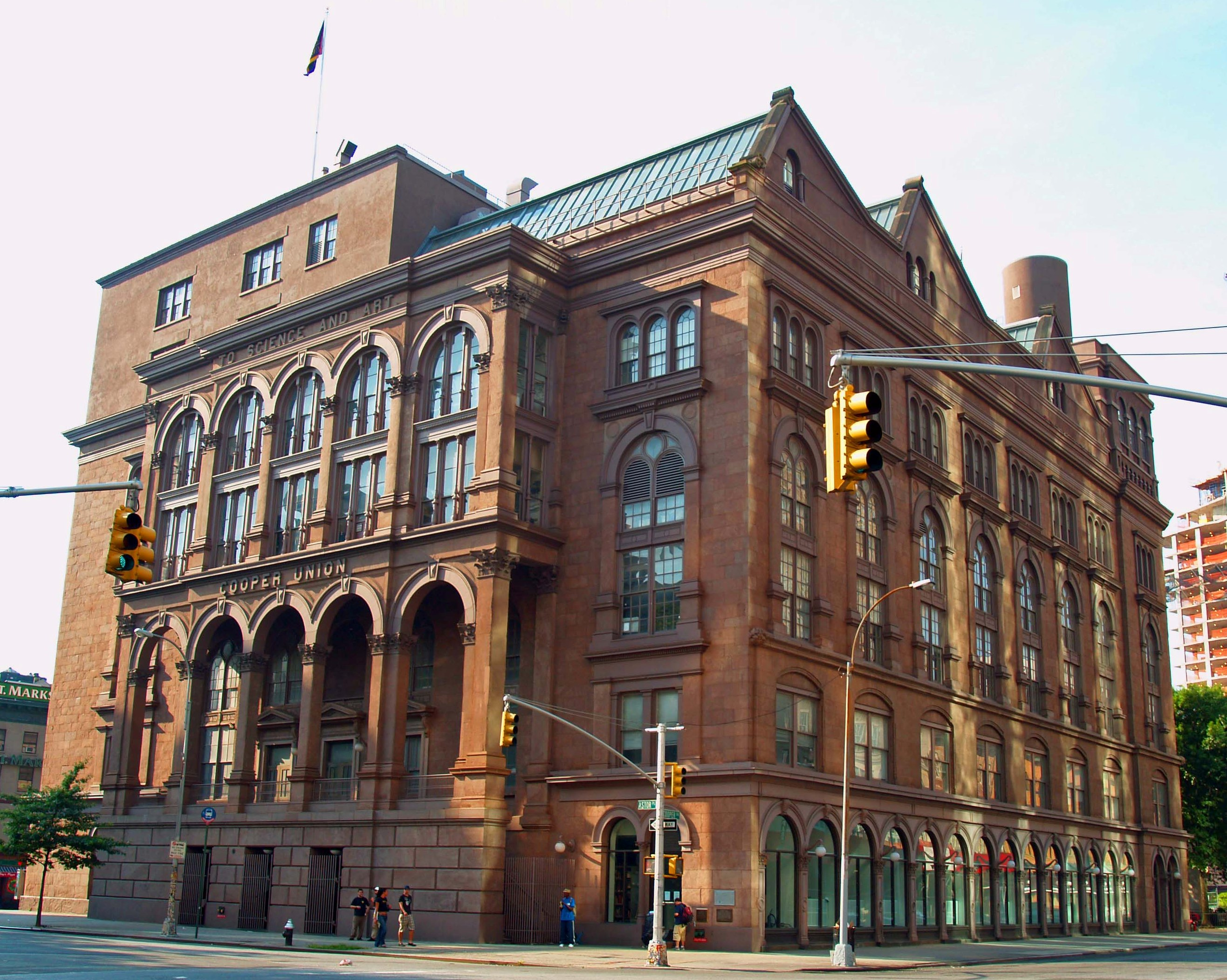
The Cooper Union's Foundation Building has anchored the north end of the square since 1859

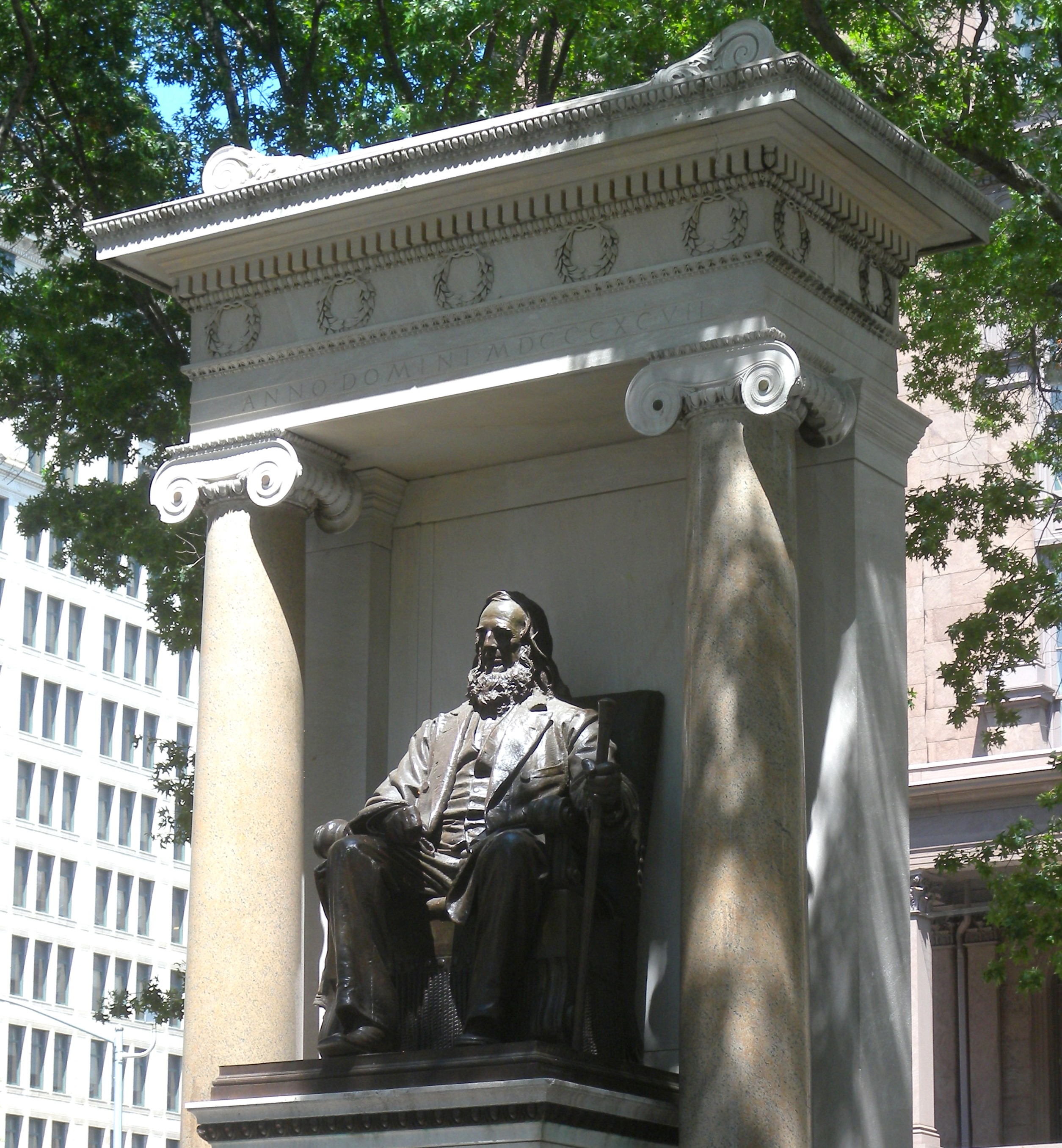
The monument to Peter Cooper sits between the Foundation Building and the park at Cooper Triangle

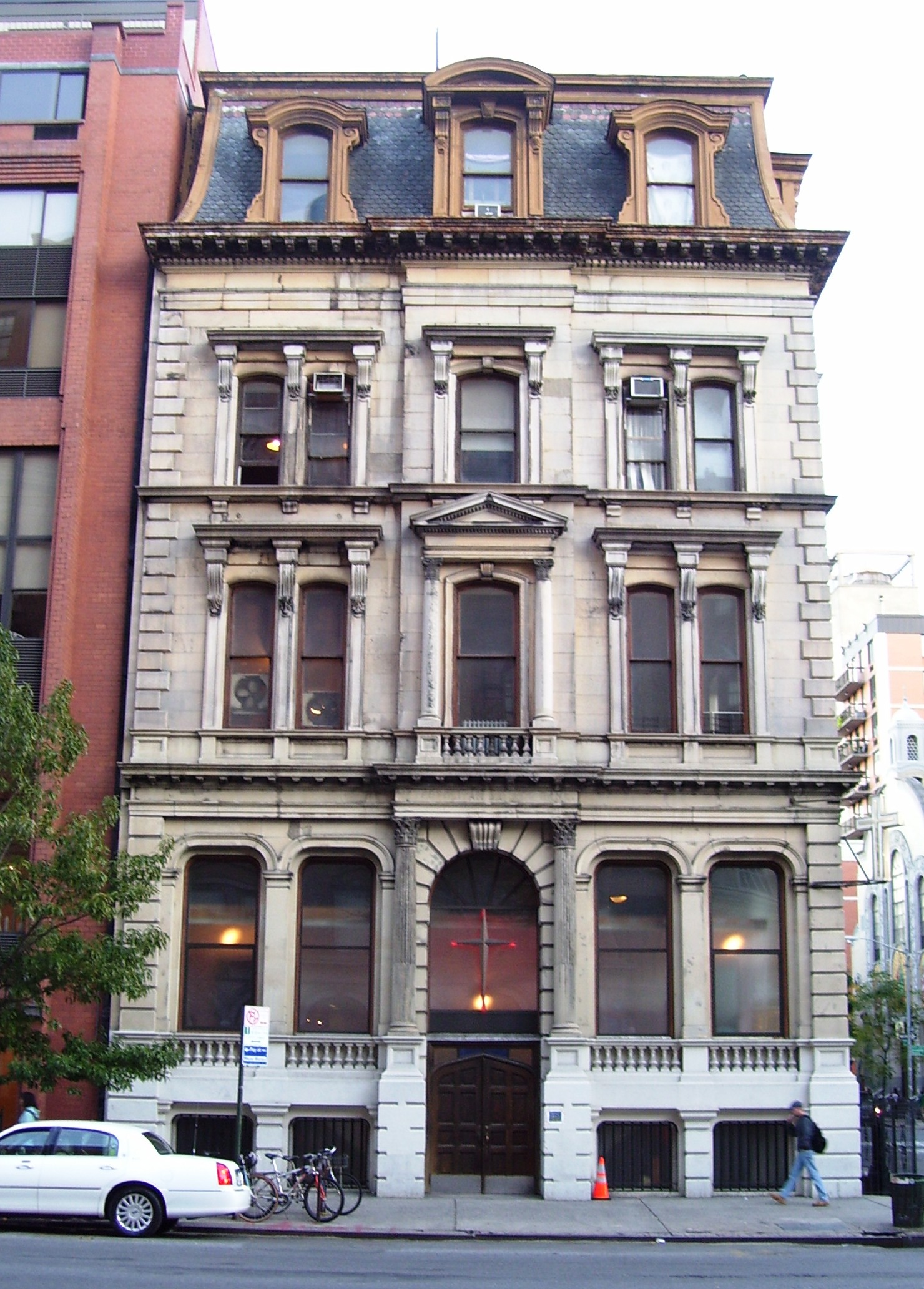
#61: This building was built in 1867 as a bank, but has been a church since 1937. (New York City Landmark, 1969)

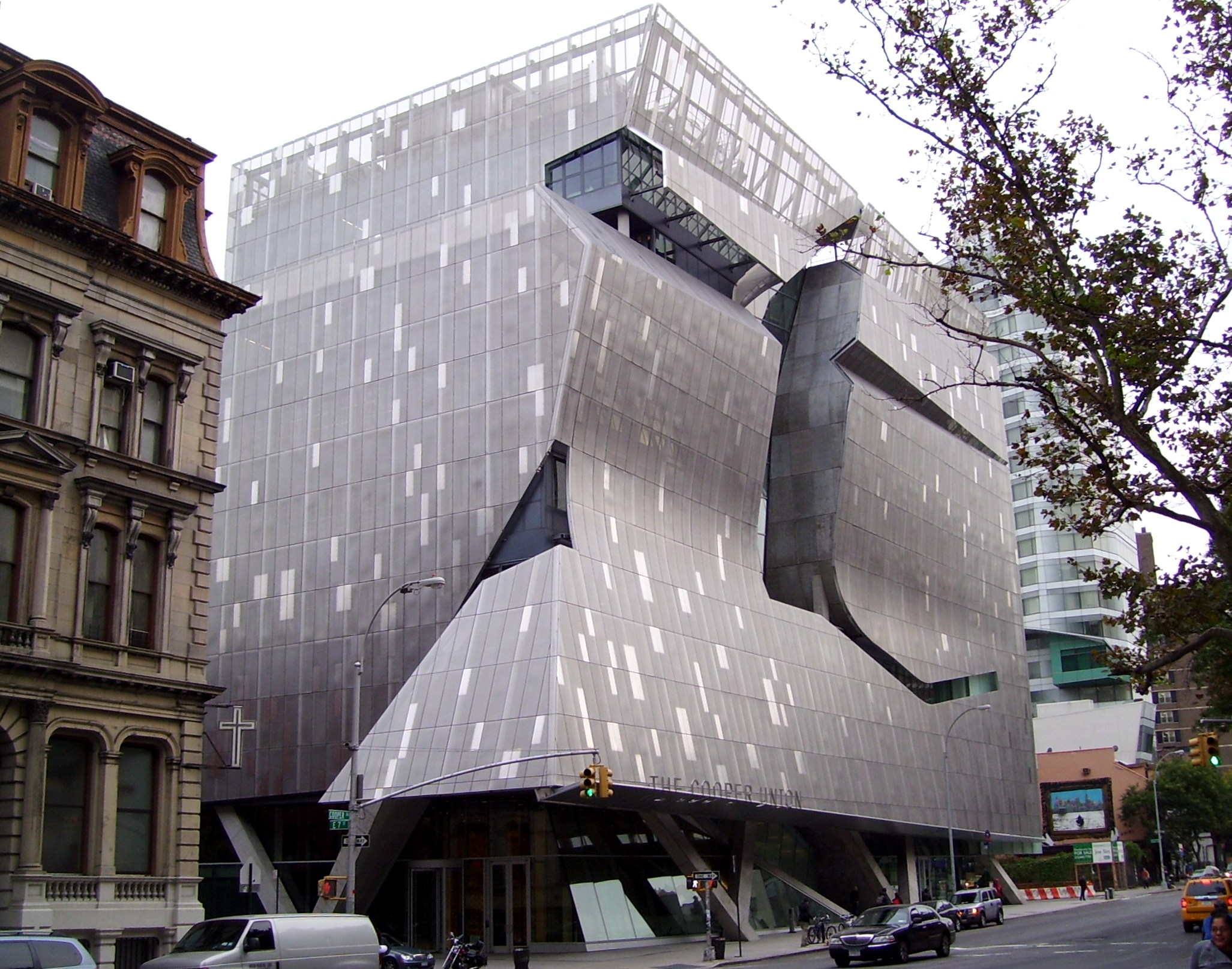
#41: Cooper Union's New Academic Building, designed by Thom Mayne, opened in Summer 2009

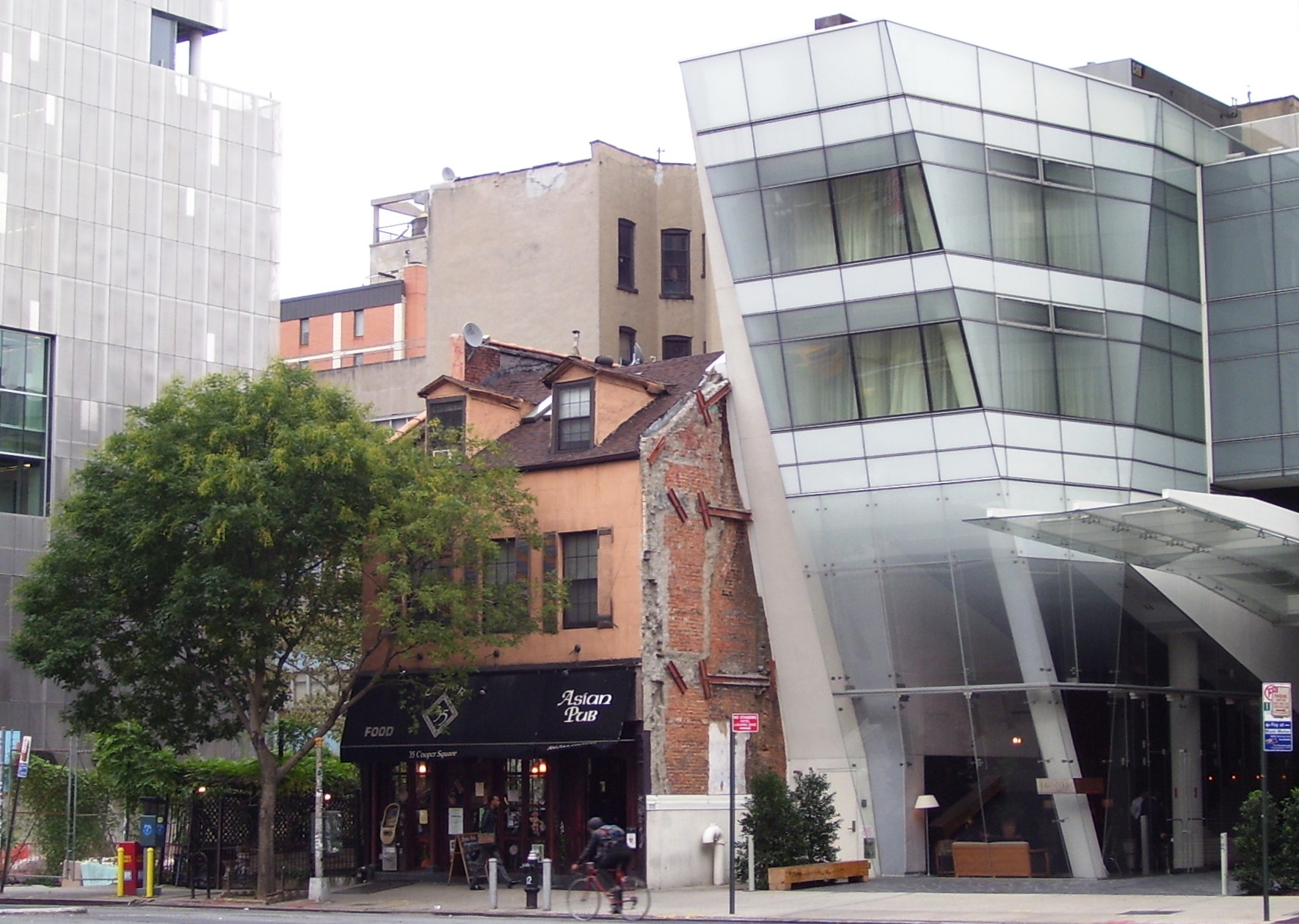
#35: The modest building on the left was owned in the early 19th century by a great-grandson of Peter Stuyvesant. It was demolished for new construction.

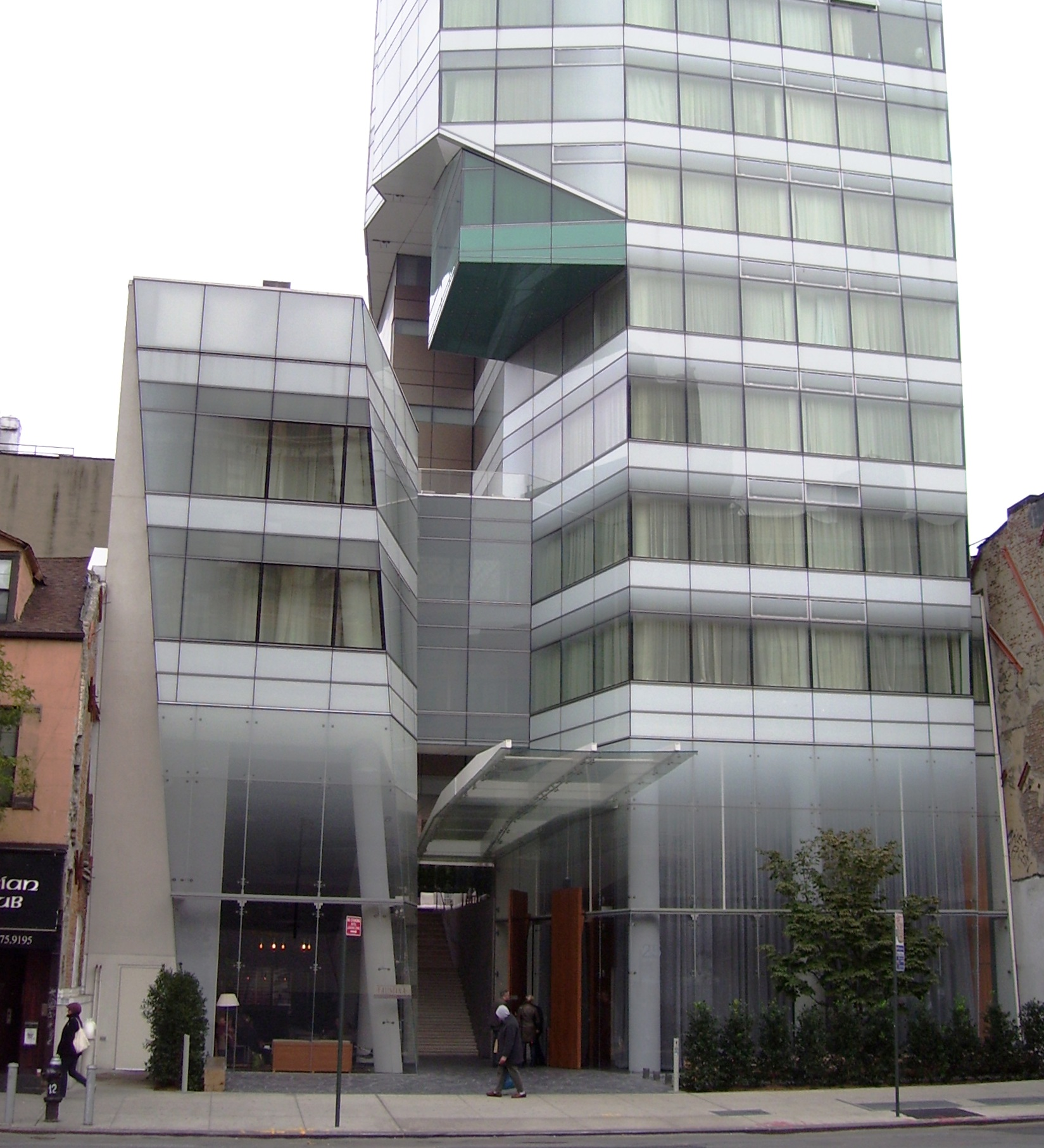
#25: The luxury The Standard, East Village hotel, an ultra-modern 21-story tower, opened in 2008 as the Cooper Square Hotel

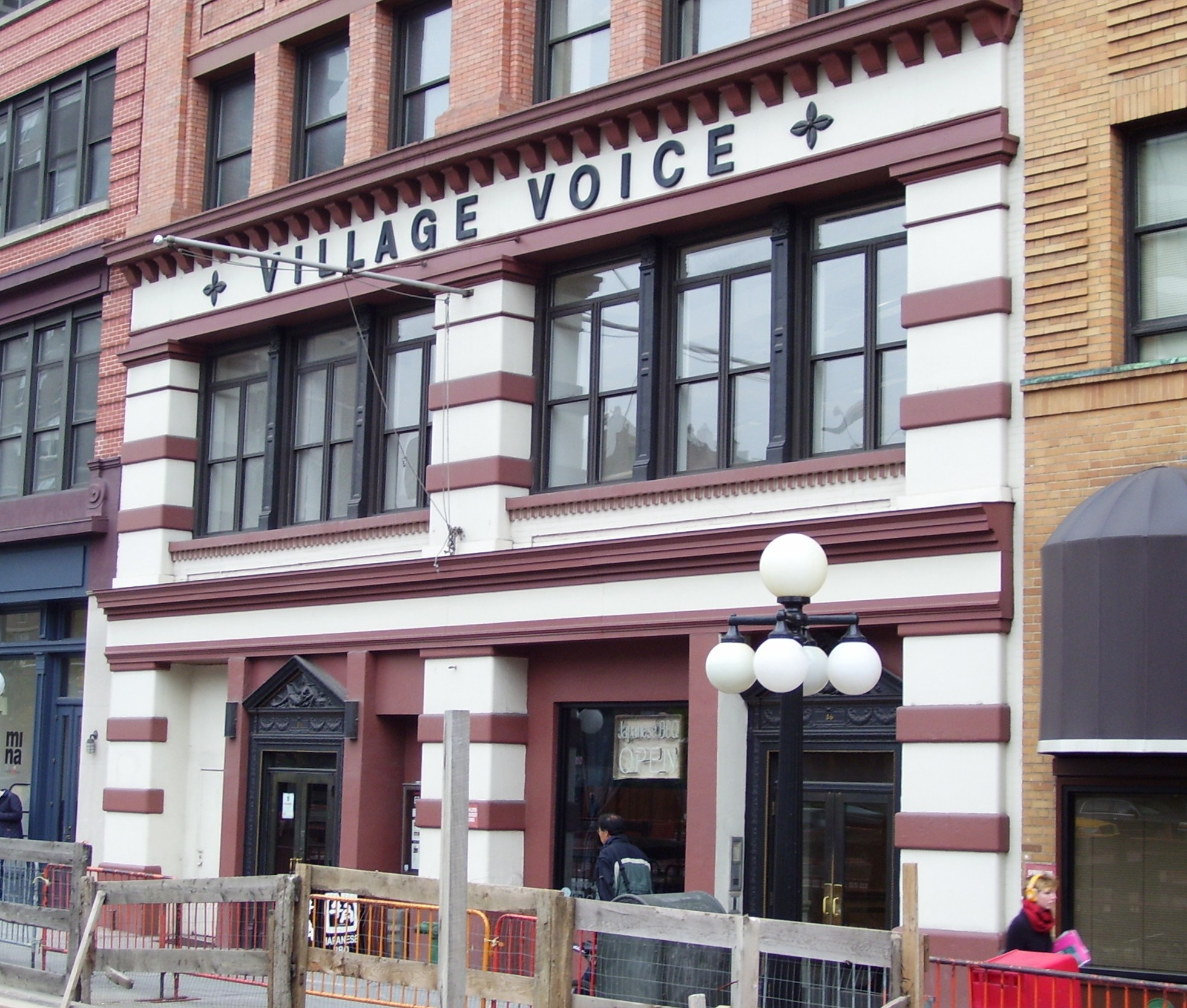
#36: As of December 2012, houses the headquarters of The Village Voice and of digital firms including curbed.com and 9Threads.

== See also ==
- Astor Place
- Cooper Square Committee
