= Cooper Square Committee =

Tenant rights advocacy nonprofit in New York City

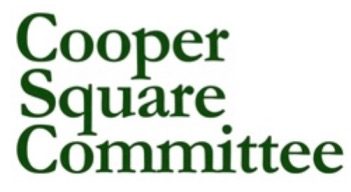
- Abbreviation: CSC
- Founded: 1959; 67 years ago
- Founder: Frances Goldin
- Legal status: 501(c)(3)
- Purpose: Tenant rights, affordable housing, neighborhood preservation
- Headquarters: New York, New York
- President: Joyce Ravitz
- Executive Director: Steve Herrick
- Website: coopersquare.org

Cooper Square Committee is a nonprofit organization based in New York City that has been actively involved in advocating for affordable housing, tenant rights, and urban planning since its establishment in 1959. The committee was formed in response to the urban renewal projects that were threatening the Cooper Square area in Lower Manhattan during the mid-20th century.

Cooper Square Committee has been involved in various campaigns and initiatives over their years in operation to preserve affordable housing and protect tenants' rights in the face of gentrification and development pressures. The committee has worked to prevent the demolition of existing affordable housing units, promote the construction of new affordable housing, and empower residents to participate in the decision-making processes that affect their neighborhoods.

In addition to its advocacy work, Cooper Square Committee has also been engaged in community organizing, providing resources and support to residents facing eviction, harassment, or other housing-related issues. The committee has a long history of grassroots activism and has successfully mobilized community members to push for policy changes and hold developers and landlords accountable for their actions.
