= Lois Gould =

American novelist (1931–2002)

- Born: Lois Adele Regensburg; December 18, 1931; New York City, U.S.
- Died: May 29, 2002 (aged 70); New York City, U.S.
- Education: Wellesley College
- Occupation: Writer
- Spouse(s): Philip Benjamin (died 1966) Robert E. Gould (m. 1967)
- Children: 2, including Roger
- Parent(s): Edward J. Regensburg Jr. Jo Copeland

Lois Gould (December 18, 1931 – May 29, 2002) was an American writer, known for her novels and other works about women's lives.

== Personal life ==
Lois Gould was born Lois Adele Regensburg on December 18, 1931 in Manhattan. She was the daughter of fashion designer Jo Copeland and cigar manufacturer Edward J. Regensburg Jr. She had one older brother, Anthony Shepherd Regensburg. Her father left when Lois was 3, and her mother was a workaholic with a distaste for children. Jo Copeland would often throw parties, which might include guests as "Joan Crawford or Tyrone Power -- Lois and her brother were expected to remain in their rooms with their supper trays, blissfully unseen and unheard." Lois grew up in New York City, in a home on Park Avenue.

Lois graduated from Wellesley College. In 1955, she married novelist and New York Times reporter, Philip Benjamin. They had two sons. In 1966, Benjamin died suddenly after complications from surgery. Among her husband's papers, Gould found a diary written in code. She cracked the code and discovered a catalog of his infidelities, many with her friends. This would become her source of inspiration for her novel Such Good Friends.

In 1967, she married psychiatrist Robert E. Gould, thus changing her name. Robert adopted both of Lois' sons, Anthony and Roger V. Gould.

In April 2002 Gould's son, sociologist Roger V. Gould, died of leukemia. One month later, Gould herself died of cancer at age 70 at Memorial Sloan-Kettering Cancer Center in Manhattan.

== Career ==
After graduating from Wellesley, Gould reported on the criminal courts for The Long Island Star-Journal, a newspaper in Long Island City, that has since folded. She became an editor on several national magazines and served as executive editor of Ladies' Home Journal.

In 1970 Lois Gould published her first novel, Such Good Friends, about a woman who learns of her husband's many affairs only after he has lapsed into a coma while in the hospital. Such Good Friends was on The New York Times Best Seller list for seven weeks and was subsequently adapted for film by Otto Preminger, released in 1971. The book was republished along with Gould's other novels in 1988.

Her novel Final Analysis, published in 1974, appears to be partly autobiographical; it features a writer falling in love with her former psychotherapist.

Her only children's story, X: A Fabulous Child's Story, was a feminist story questioning gender roles, and battling society’s views on the raising of the child X. It was published in Ms. magazine in 1972 and in 1978 expanded into a book.

In 1979, the Supersisters trading card set was produced and distributed; one of the cards featured Gould's name and picture.

Gould's 1998 memoir of life with her mother, Mommy Dressing: A Love Story, After a Fashion, enjoyed widespread critical praise.

Gould's papers are housed in Yale University's Archives.

== Works ==
Novels:

- Such Good Friends (1970)
- Necessary Objects (1972)
- Final Analysis (1974)
- A Sea Change (1976)
- La Presidenta (1981)
- Medusa's Gift (1991)

Essays:

- Not Responsible for Personal Articles (1978)

Memoir:

- Mommy Dressing: A Love Story, After a Fashion (1998)

Children's Book:

- X: A Fabulous Child's Story (1978)
