= Kate Rushin =

American poet (born 1951)

- Born: Donna Kate Rushin; 1951 (age 74–75)
- Education: Oberlin College
- Occupation: Poet
- Writing career
- Genres: Fiction; poetry
- Notable work: "The Bridge Poem"
- Notable awards: Rose Low Rome Memorial Poetry Prize; Grolier Poetry Prize
- Website: katerushinpoet.com/index.php/about/

Donna Kate Rushin (born 1951), popularly known as Kate Rushin, is a Black lesbian poet. Rushin's prefatory poem, "The Bridge Poem", to the 1981 collection This Bridge Called My Back is considered iconic. She currently lives in Connecticut.

== Education ==
Rushin was raised in Lawnside, New Jersey. She obtained a Bachelor of Art's degree from Oberlin College, and a Master of Fine Arts degree from Brown University. In 2021, she became Poet in Residence in the English Department of Connecticut College.

== Publications ==
- The Black Back-Ups (Firebrand Books, 1993).
- "After the Accident." Callaloo 23, no. 1 (2000): 192–193.
- "Word Problems." Callaloo 23, no. 1 (2000): 190–191.
- "Reeling Memories For My Father." Callaloo 23, no. 1 (2000): 188–189. Reprinted in Callaloo 24, no. 3 (2001): 885–86.
- "The Tired Poem: Lost Letter from a Typical Unemployed Black Professional Woman." In Feminism and Community, edited by Weiss Penny A. and Friedman Marilyn, 77–82. Temple University Press, 1995. Reprinted in Home Girls: A Black Feminist Anthology, ed. Barbara Smith (Rutgers University Press, 2000): 247–251.
- "The Black Back-Ups." Home Girls: A Black Feminist Anthology, ed. Barbara Smith (Rutgers University Press, 2000): 60–63.
- "Instructions from the Flight Crew to a Poet of African Descent Living in a State of Emergency." Callaloo 22, no. 4 (1999): 976–976.
- "Rosa Revisited" in Teaching the art of poetry: the moves, A, Baron Wormser and A, David Cappella (Routledge, 1999): 305–306.
- "A Pacifist Becomes Militant and Declares War." In My Lover is a Woman – Contemporary Lesbian Love Poems, Lesléa Newman (Ballantine Books, 1999): 211–214.
- "Six Poems." The Radical Teacher, no. 42 (1992): 22–23.
- "Comparative History: Our Stories." Callaloo, no. 39 (1989): 290-91.
- "Living in My Head." The Women's Review of Books 1, no. 2 (1983): 15.
- "The Brick Layers." The Women's Review of Books 1, no. 2 (1983): 15.
- "This Bridge Poem." In This Bridge Called My Back: Writings by Radical Women of Color, edited by Cherríe Moraga and Gloria E. Anzaldúa (Kitchen Table Press, 1983; reprinted State University of New York Press Albany, 2015): xxxiii-xxxiv. Republished in Feminist Theory Reader: Local and Global Perspectives, ed. Carole McCann and Seung-kyung Kim (Routledge, 2013): 266–267.

== Awards ==
- Rose Low Rome Memorial Poetry Prize
- Grolier Poetry Prize
