= Persephone Press =

Former publishing company and communications network

Persephone Press was a publishing company and communications network run by a lesbian-feminist collective in Watertown, Massachusetts. The company published fourteen books between 1976 and 1983, when the organization was sold to Beacon Press.

== History ==
The company was established as Pomegranate Productions in 1976 in Watertown, Massachusetts, by a group of lesbian feminists. Pomegranate Productions later changed their name to Persephone Press. Pat McGloin, Gloria Z. Greenfield, and Marianne Rubenstein were the founding members of the collective. After publishing A Feminist Tarot by Sally Gearhart and Susan Rennie in 1976, Pomegranate Productions was able to subsidize a conference called "Through the Looking Glass: A Gynergenetic Experience." This conference on women's spirituality was held in Boston in April 1976. Rubenstein departed from the venture in 1977, and Deborah Snow joined in 1978. The collective was reorganized in 1980 to form Persephone Press when Greenfield and McGloin incorporated the group as a partnership. The work of the press was divided with Greenfield serving as financial administrator and McGloin working as the director of marketing. Greenfield and McGloin would later describe Persephone Press as "a means to actualize women's visions." Many of the works published by the Press focused on the Jewish lesbian-feminist perspective.

After just eight years of operation, Persephone Press folded in May of 1983. The organization's financial difficulties included rejected loan renewals, back withholding taxes and penalties owed to the IRS, and the royalties owed authors, substantially higher than most offered in the publishing industry. Because Persephone Press titles sold rapidly, reprinting their backlist rapidly depleted the organization's liquid funds before they could accrue revenue in sales of titles. Controversy arose as the operation folded when author Audre Lorde criticized Persephone press for leaving women of color "holding the bag." Forthcoming titles from the Press, which they no longer has the capacity to publish, were authored by Black women, including Abeng by Michelle Cliff and Home Girls, an anthology edited by Barbara Smith. McGloin and Greenfield indicated they offered to help authors relocate their work to new publishers, but were instead in many cases asked only to revert the rights to the creator. McGloin and Greenfield also claim that when they sought support from the feminist community, including their own authors, their requests were "met not with concern, but with hostility that made our situation even more difficult." They describe the fundamental conflict in their work, that Persephone Press was founded on feminist ideals, but "it used a business structure to achieve impact."

Persephone Press was sold to Beacon Press in 1983. Though Beacon began negotiations to establish a joint imprint with the Press, this ultimately failed.

== Publications ==
List of publications:

- A Feminist Tarot by Sally Gearhart and Susan Rennie (1976)
- Fourteenth Witch by Shelley Blue Grabel (1977)
- The Wanderground by Sally Gearhart (1979)
- Choices by Nancy Toder (1980)
- Claiming an Identity They Taught Me to Despise by Michelle Cliff (1980)
- Coming Out Stories edited by Julia Stanley and Susan Wolfe (1980)
- Woman, Church & State by Matilda Jocelyn Gage, with new introduction by Sally Wagner (1980)
- This Bridge Called My Back: Writings by Radical Women of Color, edited by Cherríe Moraga and Gloria Anzaldúa (1981)
- Lesbian Poetry: An Anthology edited by Elly Bulkin and Joan Larkin (1981)
- Lesbian Fiction: An Anthology edited by Elly Bulkin (1981)
- Lifetime Guarantee by Alice Bloch (1981)
- Keeper of Accounts by Irena Klepfisz (1982)
- Nice Jewish Girls: A Lesbian Anthology edited by Evelyn Torton Beck (1982)
- Zami: A New Spelling of My Name by Audre Lorde (1982)
