= Jewish Women's Committee to End the Occupation =

Jewish Women's Committee to End the Occupation of the West Bank
- Founded: 1988
- Purpose: Palestinian solidarity, Jewish feminism
- Location: Brooklyn, New York City

The Jewish Women's Committee to End the Occupation of the West Bank and Gaza (JWCEO) was a Jewish American women's organization dedicated to opposing the Israeli occupation of the Palestinian territories.

== History ==
JWCEO was founded in New York City in April 1988 by Irena Klepfisz, Clare Kinberg, and Grace Paley. The organization held weekly vigils outside of major Jewish American organizations and in Jewish neighborhoods in order to demonstrate Jewish American opposition to the Israeli occupation of the West Bank and Gaza. JWCEO was affiliated with other anti-occupation organizations including the Israel Women's Alliance Against the Occupation and Women in Black. The creation of the organization was encouraged by Lil Moed, a Jewish American feminist who had helped organize the precursor of the Los Angeles chapter of New Jewish Agenda. JWCEO supported peaceful negotiations between the Israeli state and the Palestinian Liberation Organization to facilitate the two-state solution. Beginning on 25 April 1988, JWCEO held weekly vigils in front of Fifth Avenue offices of the Conference of Presidents of Major American Jewish Organizations. Members of JWCEO included the historians Alice Kessler-Harris and Blanche Wiesen Cook, the writer Esther Broner, and the singer Ronnie Gilbert. According to Claire Kinberg, the group faced "a lot of hostility". Irena Klepfisz has stated that JWCEO was more successful despite being less widely known in comparison to other Jewish feminist groups that had criticized the Israeli occupation, such as Di Vilde Chayes.

Between 1989 and 1991, JWCEO published a periodical called the Jewish Women's Peace Bulletin.

== See also ==
- Jewish left
