= Crown College, University of California, Santa Cruz =

Residential college of the University of California, Santa Cruz

Coordinates: 37°00′00″N 122°03′18″W

Crown College
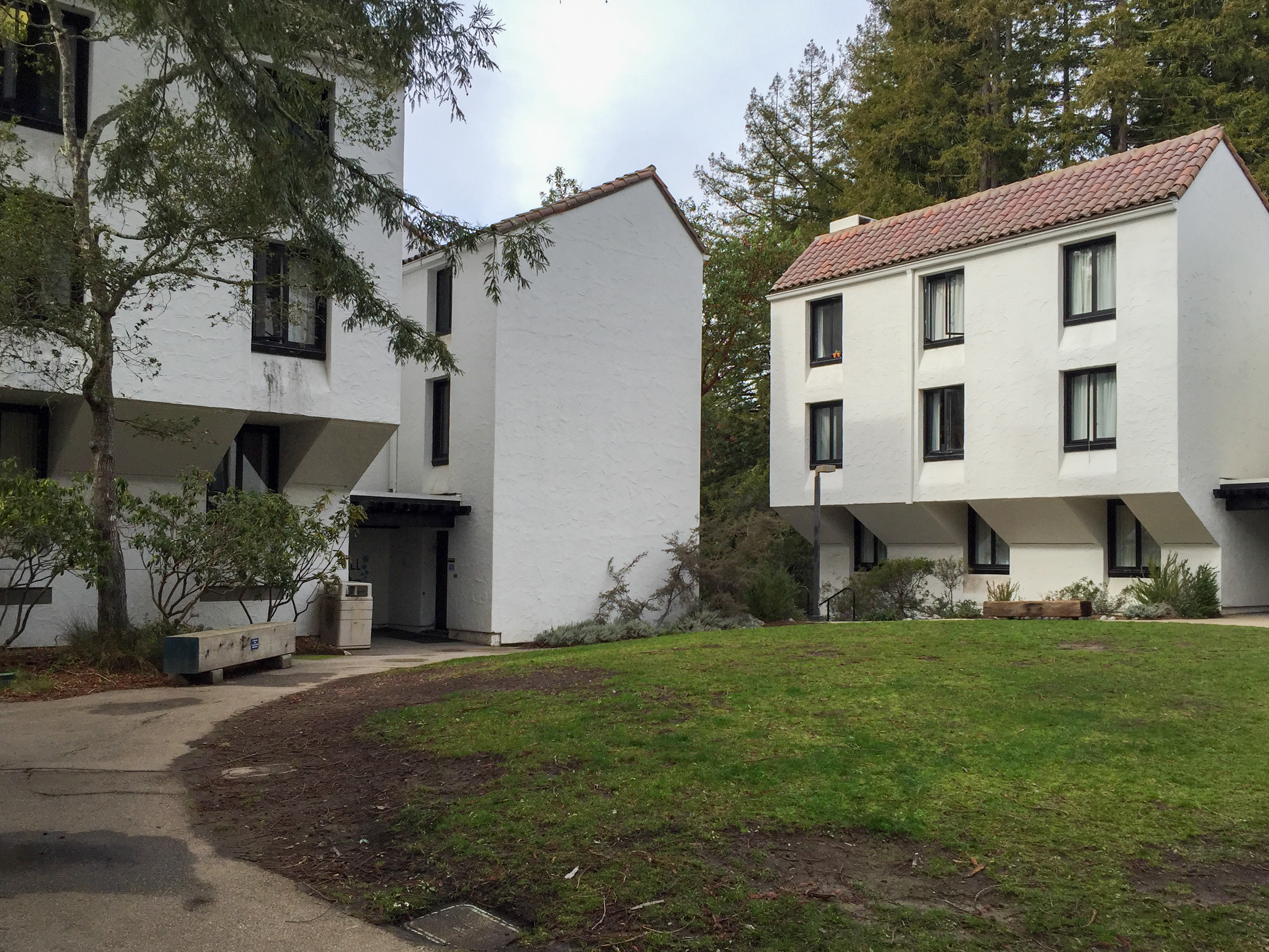
- Motto: Fiat Lux
- Type: Residential college
- Established: 1967
- Provost: Manel Camps
- Academic staff: 75
- Administrative staff: 22
- Undergraduates: 1463
- Address: 1156 High Street, Santa Cruz, California, U.S.
- Campus: Suburban
- Colors: Blue & gold
- Website: crown.ucsc.edu

Crown College is one of the residential colleges that makes up the University of California, Santa Cruz, United States.

Despite its thematic grounding in natural science and technology, like at all UCSC colleges, Crown students major in subjects across all disciplines. Crown has a favorable reputation for academically focused students, possibly due to both its reputation as a science college and its secluded location on the Santa Cruz campus. Because of its strong academic roots, Crown College is regarded as one of the quieter colleges on the campus. It is very close to Upper Campus, which is often frequented by hikers and mountain bikers.

Residents of the college are informally known as "Crownies."

== History and campus ==
Crown was founded in 1967 when the Chancellor Dean E. McHenry invited biologist Kenneth V. Thimann to come to Santa Cruz and head what would become Crown College and to build the science faculty at UCSC.

Located on the upper northern side of campus by Merrill College, Crown also borders the newly constructed Colleges Nine and Ten. Crown is made up of eight three-floor residence halls as well as having about half of the Crown-Merrill apartment buildings. The UCSC fire station is located at Crown.

Because of its strong science-related roots and continuing tradition, all of the student residence buildings have science-related themes and names: Gauss House, Galen House, Rutherford House, Harvey and Maxwell Houses, Leonardo House, Galileo House, and Descartes House.

Since 2009, Crown College started the popular College game of Humans vs Zombies attracting up to one hundred students when they meet, this is also the location where the UCSC zombie defense council will be formed.

== Students and faculty ==
=== Student demographics ===
In the third week census of the fall of 2006, the 1,463 undergraduates affiliated with Crown included 449 new and 1,014 returning students. Their ethnic composition was 2.5% African American, 1.2% Native American, 22.8% Asian, 10.0% Latino, 4.0% Chicano, 4.4% Filipino, 45.7% Euro-American, 2.2% Other, and 7.2% Unidentified. The average gender representation during the 2005–06 academic year was 42% female and 58% male. Crown was the only college at UCSC with a predominantly male enrollment, with the whole campus having a 54% to 46% female majority.

=== Notable Crown fellows ===
Several of the fellows of Crown College have been elected to the National Academy of Sciences and the American Academy of Arts and Sciences or are otherwise notable for their academic work.

- Sandra M. Faber – Professor of Astronomy & Astrophysics noted for invention of Cold dark matter theory and fundamental work in the field of Galaxy formation and evolution; member of the NAS; member of the AAAS (elected 1989)
- David Haussler – Professor of Biomolecular Engineering noted for work on the human genome and development of the UCSC Genome Browser as part of the Human Genome Project; member of the AAAS (elected 2006)
- Douglas N. C. Lin – Professor of Astronomy and Astrophysics; member of the AAAS (elected 2002)(Publications at Scientific Commons)
- Harry Noller – Professor of Biology noted for RNA research; member of the AAAS (elected 1969)
- Joel Primack – Professor of Physics, noted cosmologist; renowned for Cold Dark Matter Theory proposed along with Sandra Faber (see above) and Sir Martin Rees
- Kenneth V. Thimann – Founding Provost notable for his research in biology; in 1934, obtained and isolated pure auxin, an important plant-growth hormone and, with several coworkers, proved that auxin promotes cell elongation, formation of roots, and growth of buds, discoveries that led to the development of a widely used synthetic auxin, 2,4-D. Use of this chemical prevents the premature falling of fruit and stimulates cut stems to grow abundant roots. Because high concentrations of auxins are toxic to most plants, synthetic auxins are effective weed killers. This research was used in the subsequent development of the herbicide Agent Orange.
- Stephen Thorsett – Professor of Astronomy and Astrophysics and Dean of Physical and Biological Science known for work on properties of compact stars
- Stanford E. Woosley – Professor of Astronomy and Astrophysics noted for his work on supernova gamma ray bursts; member of the NAS and AAAS (elected 2001)
- Judit Moschkovich – Professor on Social Sciences Division, Education Department
