= Elly Bulkin =

American writer

Elly Bulkin (born December 17, 1944) is an American writer. A founding editor of two nationally distributed periodicals: Conditions and Bridges: A Journal for Jewish Feminists and Our Friends. Bridges mission statement explains that the journal sought to integrate "analysis of class and race into Jewish-feminist thought" and to be "a specifically Jewish participant in the multi-ethnic feminist movement."

She is an important figure in the history of lesbian writing.

== Personal life ==
Bulkin grew up in the Bronx, New York, after her father and maternal grandparents emigrated from Eastern Europe.

She worked for five years at the Women's Center at Brooklyn College.

An activist since the 1970s, Elly has been part of DARE/Dykes Against Racism Everywhere (NYC), Women Free Women in Prison (NYC), Feminist Action Network (Albany, NY), Women in Black (Boston), and other local political groups, in addition to being a member of the National Feminist Task Force of New Jewish Agenda. More recently, she was a steering committee member of Communities In Support of the Khalil Gibran International Academy (CISKGIA). She co-founded Jews Against Anti-Muslim Racism with Donna Nevel. A founding member of Jews Say No! (NYC) and Jews Against Islamophobia (JAI/NYC), she helped launch the Network Against Islamophobia (NAI), a project of Jewish Voice for Peace.

Now retired, she provides grant writing technical assistance to grantee partners of Astraea, the Lesbian Fund for Justice.

== Career ==
Bulkin emerged in the literary scene during the 1970s as a proud, Jewish lesbian. She regularly reviews women's poetry, but is most well-known for editing and co-editing many lesbian anthologies. She co-edited two anthologies with Joan Larkin, the first of which came out in 1975, titled Amazon Poetry: An Anthology of Lesbian Poetry. The second was from 1981 with Persephone Press, titled Lesbian Poetry: An Anthology. Also in 1981, Bulkin edited Lesbian Fiction: An Anthology.

Bulkin was a founding editor of two nationally distributed periodicals: Conditions, a magazine of writing by women with an emphasis on writing by lesbians, and Bridges: A Journal for Jewish Feminists and Our Friends. Bulkin co-founded Conditions with three fellow feminist writers in Brooklyn in 1976: Rima Shore, Irena Klepfisz, and Jan Clausen.

She has published articles on racism and writing; heterosexism and women’s studies; lesbian poetry; and other topics. Bulkin's articles on lesbian poetry cover both historical context and analysis as well as pedagogical approaches. She is co-author, with Minnie Bruce Pratt and Barbara Smith, of Yours in Struggle: Three Feminist Perspectives on Anti-Semitism and Racism (1984) and, with Donna Nevel, of Islamophobia & Israel (2013).

== Works ==
- (ed. with Joan Larkin) Amazon Poetry: An anthology of Lesbian Poetry, 1975
- (ed.) Lesbian Fiction: An Anthology, 1981
- (ed. with Joan Larkin) Lesbian Poetry: An Anthology, 1981
- (ed. with Minnie Bruce Pratt and Barbara Smith) Yours in Struggle: Three Feminist Perspectives on Antisemitism and Racism, 1984
- Enter password, recovery : re-enter password, 1990
- (with Donna Nevel) Islamophobia & Israel (2014)
