= This Bridge Called My Back =

1981 feminist anthology

- Cover of the first edition
- Editors: Cherríe Moraga; Gloria E. Anzaldúa
- Language: English
- Subject: Feminism
- Publisher: Persephone Press
- Publication date: 1981
- Media type: Print (Hardcover and Paperback)
- Pages: 261 pp.
- ISBN: 978-0-930436-10-0
- OCLC: 7513991

This Bridge Called My Back: Writings by Radical Women of Color is a feminist anthology edited by Cherríe Moraga and Gloria E. Anzaldúa first published in 1981 by Persephone Press. The book centers on the experiences of women of color and emphasizes the points of what is now called intersectionality within their multiple identities, challenging white feminists who made claims to solidarity based on sisterhood. Writings in the anthology, along with works by other prominent feminists of color, call for a greater prominence within feminism for race-related subjectivities, and ultimately laid the foundation for third wave feminism. It is among the most cited books in feminist theory.

The second edition was published in 1983 by Kitchen Table: Women of Color Press. The book's third edition was published by Third Woman Press until 2008, when it went out of print. In 2015, the fourth edition was published by State University of New York Press, Albany. In 2021, the fortieth anniversary edition was also published by State University of New York Press. Each edition has a new foreword that connects world events that transpired in between the release of the last edition and the most recent edition to the book and its themes. Each edition also has the forewords of the previous editions.

== Background ==
Anzaldúa began writing This Bridge after she experienced discrimination and exclusion at a feminist retreat that she had been invited to by author Merlin Stone. Moraga and Anzaldúa began compiling works for the anthology in 1979. The two Chicanas initially meant for the book to be a response to white feminists’ racism, but it ended up being a reflection of the conversations women of color were having at the time regarding feminism. While looking for media about women of color’s experiences in the US, they received a large amount of scholarly articles by women of color who were looking to get published. Ultimately, the co-editors turned down these works because they hoped to create a non-academic anthology that encapsulated Third World feminism in the US through spiritual, artistic, and theoretical means. Moraga was in charge of the thematic organization of the book. Both Anzaldúa and Moraga wrote introductions for different sections of the book and both of them contributed to the revision, marketing, and publication of the anthology. In the introduction of the original version of This Bridge, the co-editors state that this book was the sole focus of their time and money for the two years that it took them to publish it.

=== Content ===
While pursuing her masters at the University of Texas, Anzaldúa wrote an essay titled “Growing Up Chicana.” Anzaldúa used ideas from this essay to write “La Prieta” which is included in This Bridge. “La Prieta” is an “autohistoria” (autobiography) that highlights how her beliefs and experiences transcend boundaries. Moraga explains that the time she spent in San Francisco in the 70s with Anzaldúa helped shape her writing and her vision for This Bridge. The authors of this anthology came from a variety of cultural, economic, and racial backgrounds, and their works span different genres, writing styles, and topics. All of the essays in this book are written in the first person. In between those essays, there are poems, journal entries, interviews, photos, and more.

Racism

This Bridge Called My Back by Cherríe Moraga and Gloria Anzaldúa is a feminist piece that describes two polarizing views based on skin color, the perspectives of light and dark skin Latin American women. In addition to being a feminist piece of literature, this book by Moraga and Anzaldúa touches upon racist remarks for people of Latin American descent. The use of the term güera, both title of a chapter along with the nickname given to Moraga for her light skin tone, heavily resembles the racial remarks within the book. Additionally, prieta is a term used to describe Anzaldúa. While prieta and güera are two opposing skin tones, This Bridge Called My Back connects them with the feeling of oppression that the two women feel.

While güera is a term used within Mexico, gringo is a term widely used in all of Latin America. Güera implies a pale-skinned latino while gringo is a term used to refer to a European or white American. The choice to use güera instead of gringa shows that, while Moraga has light skin, they still see her as a member of the latino community. Moraga, due to her skin color, is in a peculiar position. While she is part of the latino community and seemingly is recognized to be hispanic, she remains an outlier solely because of her skin color, which creates a bridge contrasting her from her own identity.

In contrast, the term prieta is used widely within Spanish-speaking cultures as an indicator of dark skin. Anzaldúa, a dark skinned hispanic, endured different racial stereotypes due to her skin color. She is characterized with stereotypical, immigrant traits for having a darker skin tone along with racially motivated negative indigenous stereotypes. These comments and attitudes can even come from her own mother. While Anzaldúa primarily highlights her sexual orientation as a disturbance in her relationship with her mother, racial oppression and her mother’s attempt to shield her daughter from them result in further disturbance within the two.

This racial contrast creates a lost sense of personal identity and a challenging fit in a community. While both Moraga and Anzaldúa experience seemingly opposing stereotypes, they face the same challenges together: being judged for simply being born with a non-white skin color. What is most interesting is that these stereotypes come from people who are the exact same. Moraga mentions her mother and being opposed to her because of her skin color. Throughout the book, the differences between her mother, an immigrant, straight, and traditional woman, along with Moraga, a homosexual, white-colored feminist, become smaller and smaller. Eventually, Moraga finds that she relates to her mother. She and her mother are not that different after all.

Apart from being a book about feminism and homosexuality, this book has strong racial content that emphasizes personal identity within traditional hispanic households. While uncommonly heard of, hispanic groups experience heavy oppression from within themselves due to skin coloration. This book highlights racism in the latino community behind the initial topics mentioned. When combined, these topics all highlight the importance of personal identity, the challenges that stem from understanding oneself and her own identity.

=== Publication and revision ===
Moraga and Anzaldúa originally published the book with Persephone Press because it was a well-known feminist publisher and they had already published one of Moraga’s essays. A press release for the book from 1981 says, "the classic consciousness-raising/organizing tool for both women of color and non-colored women committed to eradicating racism within the feminist movement and society in general." Across the different editions of the anthology, Moraga and publishers have had discussions over whether or not to use the term “women of color”. This is because there is no set definition for this term and its meaning depends on the reader and their context. At the time of the original publication, Moraga and Anzaldúa considered using the term “third-world women”. They opted for “women of color” because they felt it was “most progressive” and it included women of color who were living in “first-world” countries like the US.

== Impact ==
Though other published writings by women of color existed at the time of This Bridge's printing, many scholars and contributors to This Bridge agree that the bringing together of writing by women of color from diverse backgrounds in one anthology made This Bridge unique and influential. Barbara Smith, a contributor, wrote that Black, Native American, Asian American, and Latina women "were involved in autonomous organization at the same time that we [were] beginning to find each other. Certainly This Bridge Called My Back […] has been a document of and a catalyst for these coalitions."

In addition to providing the framework for new activist-based coalitions, This Bridge has had a considerable impact upon the world of academia for its linking of feminism, race, class, and sexuality. It also brought "an intellectual framework" of identities based on race and ethnicity to lesbian and gay studies. In this bridge we call home, the anthology published in 2002 to examine the impacts of This Bridge twenty years later, Australian anthropologist Helen Johnson details This Bridge's effects on institutional teaching environments. She describes how the anthology "has allowed her to offer global perspectives on issues of race, gender, ethnicity, and power against the now antiquated white feminists' utopian ideal of universal sisterhood." This Bridge has been hailed for providing an "easily accessible discourse, plain speaking, a return to Third World storytelling, voicing a difference in the flesh, not a disembodied subjectivity but a subject location, a political and personal positioning."

Though This Bridge is referenced in many essays and books regarding the development of Third World feminism, one of the most widely recognized explorations is Norma Alarcón's essay entitled "The Theoretical Subject(s) of This Bridge Called My Back and Anglo-American Feminism." In her essay, Alarcón discusses the importance of looking at relationships not just between gender groups but within gender groups, as highlighted in This Bridge. Through questioning the existence of objective "truth" as separate from human construction, and through an analysis of language that acknowledges deep contextual and historical meanings, she highlights the intentions of This Bridge to challenge the forces that put all feminists into one category, as well as the oppositional thinking that makes differences hierarchical instead of inter-related and interdependent. Barbara Smith believed that these messages are made clear within the pages of This Bridge, asserting that "more than any other single work, This Bridge has made the vision of Third World feminism real."

However, even with these aforementioned impacts, many individuals contend that women of color feminisms still remain marginal within women's studies in the United States. Chela Sandoval, in her essay on third-world feminism, writes: "This Bridge Called My Back [...] made the presence of U.S. third world feminism impossible to ignore on the same terms as it had been throughout the 1970s. But soon the writings and theoretical challenges of U.S. third world feminists were marginalized into [...] mere 'description.'"

This Bridge "offered a rich and diverse account of the experience and analyses of women of color; with its collective ethos, its politics of rage and regeneration, and its mix of poetry, critique, fiction and testimony, it challenged the boundaries of feminist and academic discourse."

Anthologists Moraga and Anzaldúa stated in the preface that they expected the book to act as a catalyst, "not as a definitive statement on Third World Feminism" in the United States. They also expressed a desire to "express to all women, especially white, middle class women, the experiences which divide us as feminists ...we want to create a definition that expands what 'feminist' means."

Teresa de Lauretis noted that This Bridge and All the Women Are White, All the Blacks Are Men, But Some of Us Are Brave: Black Women's Studies (1982) created a "shift in feminist consciousness" by making "available to all feminists the feelings, the analyses, and the political positions of feminists of color, and their critiques of white or mainstream feminism."

Cherríe Moraga, Ana Castillo, and Norma Alarcón adapted this anthology into the Spanish-language Este puente, mi espalda: Voces de mujeres tercermundistas en los Estados Unidos. Moraga and Castillo served as editors, and Castillo and Alarcón translated the text. In 2002, AnaLouise Keating and Gloria Anzaldúa edited an anthology (this bridge we call home: radical visions for transformation) that examined the impact of This Bridge twenty years later while trying to continue the discussion started by Anzaldúa and Moraga in 1981.

== Related readings ==
- All the Women Are White, All the Blacks are Men, But Some of Us Are Brave: Black Women's Studies, edited by Gloria T. Hull, Patricia Bell-Scott, and Barbara Smith (1982)
- Telling to Live: Latina Feminist Testimonios, by the Latina Feminist Group (1993)
- Companeras: Latina Lesbians (An Anthology), edited by Juanita Ramos (1994)
- Making Face, Making Soul/Haciendo Caras: Creative and Critical Perspectives by Women of Color, edited by Glora Anzaldua (1990)
- this bridge we call home: radical visions for transformation, edited by Gloria Anzaldua and AnaLouise Keating (2002)
- Feminism in Coalition: Thinking with US Women of Color Feminism, by Liza Taylor (2022)
- Transformation Now!: Toward a Post-Oppositional Politics of Change, by AnaLouise Keating (2013)

== Contributors (writers) ==
- Norma Alarcón
- Gloria E. Anzaldúa
- Toni Cade Bambara
- Barbara May Cameron
- Andrea Ruth Ransom Canaan
- Jo Carrillo
- Chrystos (self-identified Menominee descent)
- Cheryl Clarke
- Combahee River Collective
- Gabrielle Daniels
- doris davenport
- hattie gossett
- Aurora Levins Morales
- Genny Lim
- Naomi Littlebear Morena
- Audre Lorde
- Cherríe Moraga
- Rosario Morales
- Judit Moschkovich
- Barbara Noda
- Pat Parker
- Mirtha N. Quintanales
- Kate Rushin
- Barbara Smith
- Beverly Smith
- Luisah Teish
- Max Wolf Valerio
- Nellie Wong
- Merle Woo
- Mitsuye Yamada

== Contributors (artists) ==
- Theresa Hak Kyung Cha
- Celia Herrera Rodríguez
- Happy/L.A. Hyder
- Yolanda M. López
- Ana Mendieta
- Betye Saar
- Hulleah J. Tsinhnahjinnie
- Liliana Wilson

== Este Puente, Mi Espalda: Voces de mujeres tercermundistas en los Estados Unidos contributors (artists) ==
- Pilar Agüero
- Juana Alicia
- Santa Barraza
- Marina Gutiérrez
- Ester Hernández
- Michele Ku
- Margo Machida

== See also ==
- Chicana feminism
- Black feminism
- Womanism
- Third-world feminism
- Home Girls: A Black Feminist Anthology
- Daughters of Africa
