= Melanie Kaye/Kantrowitz =

American poet (1945 – 2018)

- Born: September 9, 1945; Flatbush, Brooklyn, New York City, United States
- Died: July 10, 2018 (aged 72); Elmhurst, Queens, New York City, United States
- Occupations: Essayist; poet; academic; political activist

Melanie Kaye/Kantrowitz (September 9, 1945 – July 10, 2018) was an American essayist, poet, academic, and political activist.

== Early life ==
Born Melanie Kaye in 1945 in the Flatbush neighborhood of Brooklyn, New York City, her parents had anglicized their last name from Kantrowitz prior to her birth. Her grandparents emigrated to the United States from Eastern Europe.

She later added Kantrowitz to her name to honor her Jewish roots. Kaye/Kantrowitz was active in the Harlem Civil Rights Movement as a teenager. When she was 17, she worked with the Harlem Education Project. About this she said "It was my first experience with a mobilizing proud community and with the possibilities of collective action."

Kaye/Kantrowitz associated her activism with her Jewish upbringing, stating that it was related to her family's Jewish cultural and political heritage "as much as the candles we lit for Hanukkah, or the Seders where bread and matzoh shared the table." She wrote in her essay "To Be a Radical Jew in the Late 20th Century" that her "parents had not pushed [her] into activism, yet clearly they raised [her] to do these things".

In 1966, she left New York to attend graduate school in Berkeley, California. Later, she moved to Portland, Oregon, where she remained until 1979 before spending several years in New Mexico.

== Activism ==
Kaye/Kantrowitz described herself as a "Conscious Jew". Along with Irena Klepfisz and Adrienne Rich, among others, Kaye/Kantrowitz was a member of Di Vilde Chayes (English: The Wild Beasts), a Jewish feminist group that examined and responded to political issues in the Middle East, as well as to antisemitism.

In 1990, she served as a founding director for Jews for Racial and Economic Justice (JFREJ), a progressive Jewish organization focused mostly on anti-racist work and issues of economic justice. Kaye/Kantrowitz served on the JFREJ board from 1995 to 2004. Of her work with JFREJ, Kaye/Kantrowitz said: "Though the content of our mission is not specifically feminist, we have modeled feminist activism and included a feminist spin on issues such as hate violence, right of workers to organize, police brutality, and educational equity."

Around 1990, she also co-founded Beyond the Pale: The Progressive Jewish Radio Hour, a radio program that aired weekly on WBAI (99.5 FM) which "mixes local, national, and international political debate and analysis, from a progressive Jewish perspective with the voices and sounds of contemporary Jewish culture".

Kaye/Kantrowitz also served on the steering committee of New Jewish Agenda.

== Academia ==
Melanie Kaye/Kantrowitz taught the first women's studies course at the University of California, Berkeley. She also taught at Hamilton College, Brooklyn College/CUNY, Vermont College, and Jewish studies, history and comparative literature at Queens College.

== Death ==
Kaye/Kantrowitz died on July 10, 2018, of Parkinson's disease, aged 72.

== Publications ==
Kaye/Kantrowitz's works include:

- We Speak in Code: Poems and Other Writings (1980, Motheroot Publications)
- The Tribe of Dina: A Jewish Women’s Anthology (1989, Beacon Press; editor, with Irena Klepfisz)
- My Jewish Face, and Other Stories (1990, Aunt Lute Books)
- The Issue is Power: Essays on Women, Jews, Violence and Resistance (1995, Aunt Lute Books)
- The Colors of Jews: Racial Politics and Radical Diasporism (2007, Indiana University Press)

She contributed to anthologies, including:

- Lesbian Poetry: An Anthology (1981)
- Fight Back: Feminist Resistance to Male Violence (1981)
- Nice Jewish Girls: A Lesbian Anthology (1984)

Kaye/Kantrowitz also edited the lesbian periodical Sinister Wisdom from 1983 to 1987.
