= Conditions (magazine) =

Lesbian feminist literary magazine

- The Black Women's Issue, November 1979
- Frequency: Biannual (1976 - 1980); Annual (1980 - 1990)
- Founder: Elly Bulkin; Jan Clausen; Irena Klepfisz; Rima Shore
- First issue: 1976
- Final issue: 1990
- Country: United States
- Based in: Brooklyn, New York
- Language: English
- ISSN: 2381-5620
- OCLC: 646884046

Conditions (full title: Conditions: a feminist magazine of writing by women with a particular emphasis on writing by lesbians) was a lesbian feminist literary magazine that came out biannually from 1976 to 1980 and annually from 1980 until 1990, and included poetry, prose, essays, book reviews, and interviews. It was founded in Brooklyn, New York, by Elly Bulkin, Jan Clausen, Irena Klepfisz and Rima Shore.

The full Conditions catalog is available on the Lesbian Poetry Archive.

== Publishing collective ==
Conditions was a magazine that emphasized the lives and writings of lesbians, and, throughout its history, maintained an all-lesbian collective. This collective expressed a "long standing commitment to diversity; of writing style and content and of background of contributors", within the lesbian and feminist communities. Conditions was especially dedicated to publishing the work of lesbians, in particular working-class lesbians and lesbians of color. It was associated with the women in print movement, an effort by second-wave feminists to establish autonomous communications networks of feminist periodicals, presses, and bookstores created by and for women. Beginning in 1968, over 500 feminist publications were established in the United States. Many, like Conditions, were operated as collectives.

While the founders were all white, Conditions was committed to promoting multiracial, multicultural, and multiethnic voices from its inception. By the early 1980s, the magazine had a diverse group of editors, especially under the leadership of Cheryl L. Clarke.

== The Black Women's Issue ==
The journal's fifth issue, published in November 1979, was edited by Barbara Smith and Lorraine Bethel. Conditions 5 was "the first widely distributed collection of Black feminist writing in the U.S.", and was later to be the basis for the anthology Home Girls: A Black Feminist Anthology (1983), one of the first books released by Kitchen Table: Women of Color Press. Conditions 5: The Black Women's Issue was hugely popular, and set a record in feminist publishing by selling 3,000 copies in the first three weeks it was available.

== Publication ceases ==
Conditions ceased publication in 1990. It ended because the existing collective members were focusing on other projects and they were unable to find new members.

== Editors ==
- Barbara Smith
- Lorraine Bethel
- Dorothy Allison
- Cheryl L. Clarke
- Jewelle Gomez
- Nancy Clarke Otter
- Debbi Schaubman
- Elly Bulkin
- Jan Clausen
- Irena Klepfisz
- Rima Shore
- Melinda Goodman
- Paula Martinac
- N. Mirtha Quintanales
- Randye Lordon

== Selected contributors ==
- Wilmette Brown
- Joy Harjo
- Cherríe Moraga
- Joan Nestle
- Amber Hollibaugh
- Donna Allegra
- Becky Birtha
- Audre Lorde
- Ann Allen Shockley
- Beverly Smith
- Gloria Anzaldúa
- Joan Larkin
- Paula Gunn Allen
- Jacqueline Lapidus
- Adrienne Rich
- Michelle Cliff
- Hattie Gossett
- Chrystos
- Marilyn Hacker
- Mitsuye Yamada
- Jo Carillo
- Toi Derricotte
- Minnie Bruce Pratt
- Bonnie Zimmerman
- Elly Bulkin
- Cheryl Clarke
- Dorothy Allison
- Irena Klepfisz
- Jewelle Gomez
- Honor Moore
- Luzma Umpierre
- Linda Smukler (Samuel Ace)
- Ramina Mays
- Barbara Banks
- Mab Segrest
- Sapphire

== See also ==
- List of lesbian periodicals
