= Mirtha =

Mirtha is a female given name. Notable people with the name include:

- Mirtha Brock (born April 9, 1970), Colombian athlete
- Mirtha Colón (born 1951), Honduran activist
- Mirtha Dermisache (1940–2012), Argentine artist
- Mirtha Legrand (born 1927), Argentine actress and television presenter
- Mirtha Marrero, Cuban pitcher
- Mirtha Michelle (born 1984), American actress
- Mirtha N. Quintanales, Cuban feminist and writer
- Mirtha Reid (1918–1981), Uruguayan actress
- Mirtha Rivero (born 1956), Venezuelan journalist and writer
- Mirtha Vásquez (born 1975), Peruvian lawyer
