= The Wanderground =

1978 novel by Sally Miller Gearhart

- First edition
- Author: Sally Miller Gearhart
- Subject: separatist feminism movement
- Genre: speculative fiction novel
- Published: 1978
- Publisher: Persephone Press

The Wanderground is a speculative fiction novel by Sally Miller Gearhart, published in 1978 by Persephone Press. It is Gearhart's first and most famous novel, and continues to be used in women's studies classes as a characteristic example of the separatist feminism movement from the 1970s. It was republished by The Women's Press as part of their grey pocket book science fiction sequence in 1985 (cover by Lesli Sternberg).

== Structure ==
The Wanderground is a collection of short, interlocking narratives that build on each other to form a full novel. Chapters fit together loosely, often focusing on completely different characters in each chapter, or taking place in a different part of the world Gearhart created, although many characters make reappearances throughout the collection, as the stories begin to build on each other. Many of the chapters were first published as short stories, in fanzines, magazines, and lesbian periodicals including Ms., The Witch and the Chameleon, Quest: A Feminist Quarterly, and WomanSpirit

== Summary ==
The Wanderground is set in the United States, in the future, although no date is given. The stories focus on the hill women, a group of women who have fled from the men-ruled cities to the wilderness, where they live in all-women communities in harmony with each other and the natural world. The hill women have psychic powers that they use to communicate with each other and with animals, and to move through the world. The main narrative that weaves throughout almost all of the stories, is caused by some kind of shift in the cosmic balance between the hill women and the cities. Rumors are whispered, things are getting worse for women in the cities. As the stories build on each other, subtle remarks are made about how things are getting worse, the cities are becoming even more controlling, it is more dangerous for the women underground, men are appearing outside of the cities, even to the point of rapes occurring in the borderlands. Something is changing. The tension finally comes to the foreground when the gentles (gay men, who have the greatest respect for all women, especially the hill women) request a meeting with the hill women. The message is smuggled out of the city, and a great discussion begins. Even though the gentles are considered to be allies of the hill women, they are still men, and this mixed status of ally and enemy causes a great debate.

== Characters ==
As The Wanderground functions as a series of short stories in different parts of a world, the characters are listed here in association with the setting in which they appear.

- Western Ensconcement, a community of women: Seja, Clana, Zephyr, Voki, Artilidea
- Eastern Ensconcement, a community of women: Jaqua, Troja, Pelagine,
- Kochlias, noted for being the home of the 'Remember Rooms': Fora, Manaje, Li, Clana
- Borderlands, the edge of the hill women's territory: Alaka, Ono, Egathese, Blase
- Dangerland, between the land of the hill women and the city: Pony, Krueva, Ijeme, Ursula
- Earlytown, an abandoned town just outside the city: The Gentles, Evona, Chthona, Tulu
- The City: Betha, Ijeme, Evona

== Themes ==
=== Gender ===
Gender is a source of tension throughout the novel. Among the basic tenets of the relationship between the communities of hill women to men is "It is not in his nature not to rape. It is not in my nature to be raped. We do not co-exist." (page 25). Gearhart said in an interview with off our backs that figuring out how those dynamics play out, the question of "what is the hill women's relationship to the men" is one of the main questions of the book.

=== Environmentalism ===
This book is also linked by scholars with the idea of ecofeminism. The ideas it presents of women living as one with the greater natural world, of being able to control one's fertility, and of the communication with other non-human living beings, as well as the poetic style of prose Gearhart writes in are of particular interest to readers coming from an environmental background.

== Legacy ==
Because of its themes of feminist separatism and publication by Persephone Press, the novel is associated with the women in print movement, an effort by second wave feminists to establish autonomous communications networks of feminist periodicals, presses, and bookstores created by and for women. It inspired the name of Wanderground Lesbian Archive and Library in Cranston, Rhode Island, which collects lesbian publications in New England with a focus on the women in print movement.
