= Jo Carrillo =

American legal scholar

Academic background
- Education: Stanford University (BA, SJD); University of New Mexico (JD)

Academic work
- Discipline: Law
- Sub-discipline: Property law Consumer protection Legal Humanities
- Institutions: University of California College of the Law, San Francisco

Jo Carrillo is an American legal scholar working as a professor of law at the University of California College of the Law, San Francisco.

== Education ==
Carrillo received her Bachelor of Arts degree from Stanford University, a Juris Doctor from the University of New Mexico School of Law, and a Doctor of Juridical Science (SJD) in law from Stanford Law School.

== Career ==
Carrillo has received awards within the disciplines of scholarly work on property and material property systems, financial intimate partner violence, consumer protection issues, and legal humanities. These honors include the Chip Robertson Scholarly Publications Fund Award, The Outstanding Mentor Award to American Indian, Alaska Native, and Native Hawaiian Students, The Roger J. Trainer Scholarly Publication Award, a Mediator Certification, an Outstanding Service and Achievement Award, and Hastings Research Chair.

Carrillo contributed a poem to This Bridge Called My Back, a 1981 feminist anthology.

== Bibliography ==
- Readings in American Indian Law (1998, Temple University Press)
- Understanding California Community Property Law (2015, LexisNexis)
