= Jan Clausen =

American writer

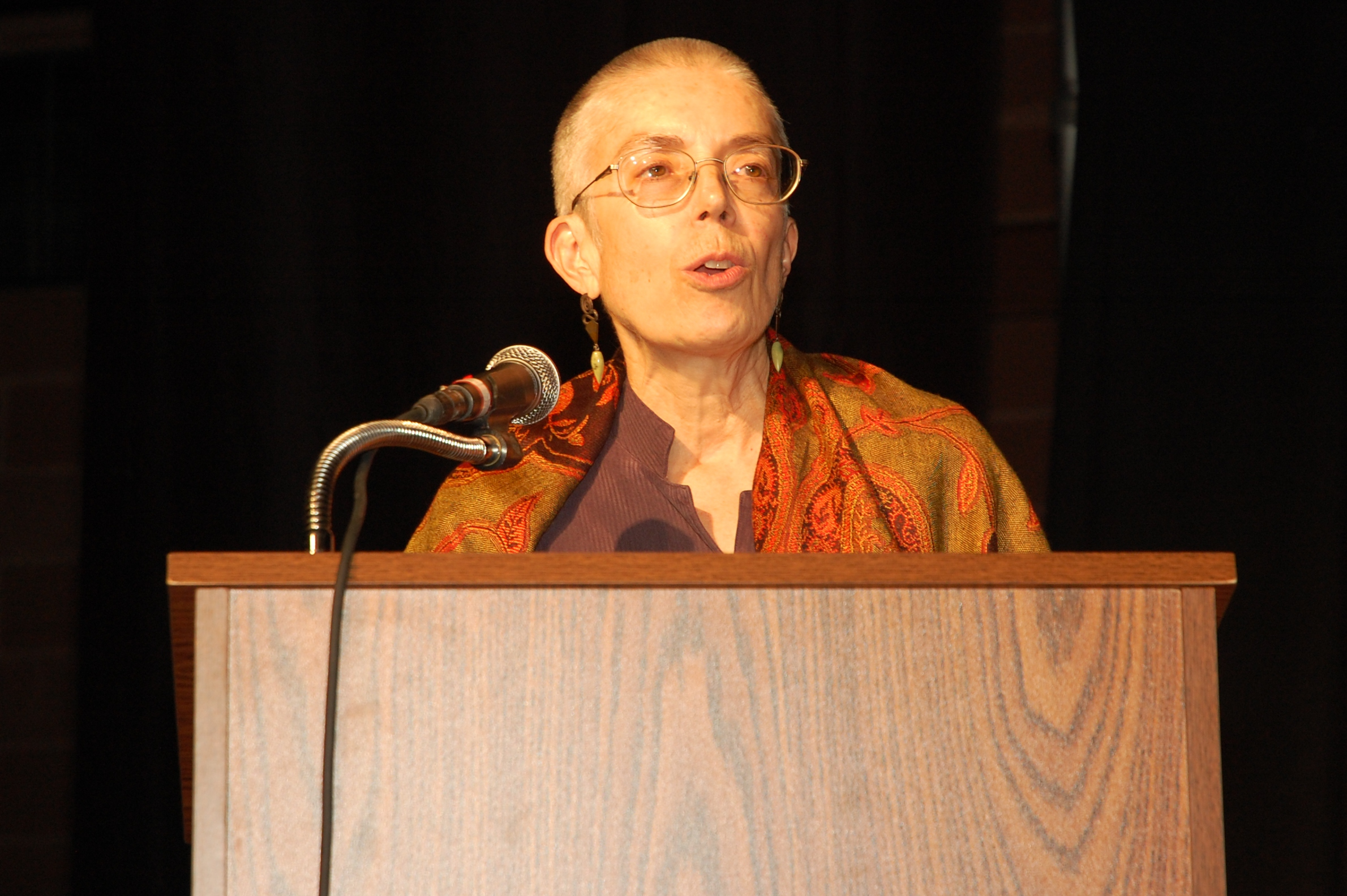
Clausen speaking at the National Writers Union (NWU - UAW Local 1981) 30th anniversary celebration in NYC

Jan Clausen (North Bend, Oregon, 1950) is an American writer. Her work includes poetry, fiction, and essays and has been widely published in the feminist press and elsewhere. She has co-edited Conditions, a journal of women's writing, with Elly Bulkin. She is the author of the first critical essay on the feminist poetry movement of the 1970s, A Movement of Poets. Thoughts on Poetry and Feminism, 1982.

== Works ==
- After Touch, 1975
- Waking at the Bottom of the Dark, 1979. Poetry.
- Mother, Sister, Daughter, Lover, 1980
- Duration, 1983. Collection of stories.
- Sinking Stealing, 1985. Novel.
- Illustrated by None: The Prosperine Papers, 1988
- Books and Life, 1989
- Beyond Gay or Straight: Understanding Sexual Orientation, 1996
- Apples and Oranges: My Journey through Sexual Identity, 1999
