= Eric Thiman =

British composer (1900 - 1975)

- Born: 12 September 1900; Ashford, Kent, England
- Origin: England
- Died: 13 February 1975 (aged 74) London, England
- Occupations: Composer; choir conductor; organist

Eric Harding Thiman (12 September 1900 – 13 February 1975) was an English composer, conductor and organist. The surname is pronounced 'tea-man'. By 1939 he was considered one of the leading non-conformist organists in England. His choral and educational music is still performed today.

== Early life and education ==
Thiman was born in Ashford, Kent, England as Eric Harding Thimann. He later changed his last name to Thiman to avoid anti-German sentiment in Britain. His father, Israel Felix Thimann, came to the UK from Poland and converted from Judaism to become a minister in the Congregational Church. His mother, Muriel Thimann, was the founder of Ashford School in Kent in 1898. She was widowed in 1912. Of his three brothers, Ralph was a member of the Royal Flying Corps, killed during World War 1. Kenneth Thimann became a renowned microbiologist, and Cedric was a linguist and Head of Modern Languages at Nottingham High School.

Educated at Caterham School, he was largely self-taught in music. In 1921, he was awarded a fellow of the Royal College of Organists (FRCO) and (after some coaching from Harold Darke, who remained a friend) took his DMus at London University in 1928. That year, he married Madeline Arnold, a musician and singer.

== Career ==
From 1930 he was Professor of Harmony at the Royal Academy of Music and later, from 1956 to 1962, was Dean of the Faculty of Music at the University of London.

In 1958, after 29 years as organist at Park Chapel, Crouch End, Thiman was appointed organist of the City Temple in London. He was a keen advocate of amateur music-making and in the 1960s was the conductor and musical director of the Purley Choral Society, which performed his choral song cycle Spring Garland in 1964. He wrote much educational music for piano and other instruments, as well as music for church choirs, some of which is still performed. He was the musical editor of the hymn book Congregational Praise (1951). He is best remembered for his short passion cantata, The Last Supper (1930), which sets texts from the gospels of Matthew and John and hymns by St Thomas Aquinas, Charles Wesley, and Johann Franck.

He founded and conducted The Eric Thiman String Ensemble in the 1940s. He was conductor of the Elysian Concert Society, holding concerts at Hornsey Town Hall, The City Temple and other venues in London. In August 1951, he toured Australia to conduct examinations for the Australian Musical Examinations Board.

Thiman was still working actively when he died of cancer in 1975, aged 74 years. He was survived by his wife Madeline, who died in 1981; there were no children. Their address in the 1960s and 1970s was 7 Edmunds Walk, London NW2.

== Music ==
Thiman was a prolific composer whose works were widely published in the UK and the USA. The catalogue of his published works numbers about 1,300. These include a large number of part songs (often for SS or SSA and piano, but also some for SATB) and many anthems and carols, as well as over 100 published organ pieces. A CD selection of his anthems, partsongs and organ music was recorded in 2016 by the Tudor Singers and the Eric Thiman Singers of Caterham School.

Most of his church music was written for the non-conformist churches, but he also wrote anthems and canticles for Church of England choirs. He was influenced by Edward Elgar (1857–1934), but as Michael Hurd points out, the titles of his extended choral works – The Last Supper (1930), The Parables (1931), The High Tide on the Coast of Lincolnshire (1932), and The Temptations of Christ (1952) – more closely reflect the pre-Elgar lineage of John Stainer, Stanford and Parry. The Last Supper, of approachable difficulty for amateurs, is sometimes programmed as an alternative to Stainer's The Crucifixion. For the Congregational Praise hymn book of 1951, he contributed 15 tunes to the volume (including 'Gildas' and 'Stella') as well as descants and arrangements. In 1969, he also wrote Varied Harmonies to Hymn Tunes: A short practical treatise.

There are many secular and sacred partsongs and solo songs, including some lighter songs under the name Eric Harding. A selection of songs were recorded by Convivium Records in 2022. Although he mostly wrote with amateurs and practical church musicians in mind, there were also orchestral works and instrumental pieces for professionals. His first extended chamber piece was the Violin Sonata of 1934, dedicated to the violinist Sidney Hall and broadcast by him with the composer at the piano the following year. The four movement Suite in E for two pianos (1947) was written for Harry Isaacs and York Bowen, both colleagues of his at the Royal Academy. In 2004, an early piano sonata, dated 1925, was discovered in a second-hand bookshop in Sussex and has been published by Fand Music.

An archive of his music, The Eric Thiman Collection, was set up in 2014 in the choir library of Southwell Minster by his niece Francis Thiman and Paul Hale (then Rector Chori at Southwell).

== Selected works ==
=== Cantatas ===
- The Last Supper (Passion cantata, 1930)
- The Parables (1931)
- The High Tide on the Coast of Lincolnshire (1932)
- The Nativity (Christmas cantata, 1934)
- Ring Out Ye Crystal Spheres (text: Milton) (1938)
- The Temptations of Christ Lenten cantata, 1952)
- Christmas Cantata: The Flower of Bethlehem (text: Irene Gass) (1958)

=== Anthems ===
- Children of Jerusalem
- Christ is the World's Light
- Fight the good fight (hymn anthem)
- Gloria in exceteis Deo
- The King of love my shepherd is
- Let All the World
- Let Thy merciful ears, O Lord
- Lord, think on me
- Morning Prayer (text: W B Heathcote)
- Seek ye the Lord
- Sing we triumphant hymns of praise
- Te Deum in D flat
- There is a stream
- Three Choral Songs of Praise
  - 'Morning Hymn'
  - 'I Praised the Earth'
  - 'O Praise God In His Holiness'
- Ye Holy Angels Bright

=== Song cycles ===
- A Folk Song Sequence (1961)
- Six Sea Songs
- A Spring Garland, for mixed choir and orchestra
- Songs of England
- Songs of Travel ('Give me a ship to sail the seas', 'Magic', 'A Good Companion', 'Roaming', 'Homewards')

=== Partsongs and solo songs ===
(many appeared in both solo voice and choral arrangements)
(* collected in Thirteen Songs)

- As Joseph was a-walking *
- Away to Rio
- The Birds (text: Belloc)
- Dainty fine bird *
- Easter Prayer
- Evening in Lilac Time *
- Evening in the Birch-Path
- Fain Would I Change That Note
- The Ferry (text: Christina Rossetti)
- The Heavenly Down (text: Irene Gass)
- I Saw Three Ships *
- I Wandered Lonely as a cloud (text: Wordsworth) *
- Jesus the Very Thought of You
- Madonna and Child *
- The Man in the Moon
- Now Sleeps the Crimson Petal (text: Tennyson) *
- The Path to the Moon
- The Rainbow *
- The Shepherd (text: William Blake) *
- She Walks in Beauty (text: Byron)
- The Silver Swan *
- Sleeping *
- Song of Farewell
- The Swans
- Sweet Afton (text: Robert Burns) *
- Where the Boats Go (text: R.L. Stevenson) *

=== Organ ===
- Eight Interludes, sets one, two and three (1946–1952)
- Four Chorale Improvisations
- Four Occasional Pieces ('A Morning Prelude', 'An Easter Prelude', 'A Lenten Sarabande', 'Christmas Meditation') (1957)
- Four Quiet Voluntaries (1963)
- Pastorale (1938)
- Preludes and Voluntaries, books one, two and three (1940, 1943 and 1947)
- Six Pieces in Various Styles (1960)
- Three Preludes on Themes by Orlando Gibbons (1956)
- Times and Seasons, five pieces for organ, sets 1 and 2 (1954 and 1958)

=== Other works ===
- A Folk Song Suite, for string quartet (Augener, 1928)
- Flood Time, solo piano, ABRSM syllabus, Grade 5 (and many other graded piano pieces)
- Highland Scenes. Five short piano pieces of moderate difficulty: 'By rock-bound coast';'Evening on Skye'; 'Celtic tune'; 'In the heather'; and 'At the highland gathering'.
- Miniature trio: In Springtime, three movements for piano trio
- Suite in E for two pianos (published Curwen, 1947): Alla Menuetto, Fughetta, Sarabande, Rigaudon. (There is also a different Suite in E in three movements: Prelude; Sarabande, Gavotte)
- Three Shanty Pieces, for piano (1934)
- Two English Dances, for piano trio
- Variations on a theme of Elgar for orchestra (1940), the theme taken from Elgar's partsong As Torrents in Summer
- Violin Sonata (1934), three movements
- When Cats Run Home, two part canon

Thiman wrote Practical Free Counterpoint, which was published in 1947. His Thirteen Songs for Voice and Piano, published by Stainer and Bell, has remained in print since his death.
