= Kenneth V. Thimann =

English-American plant physiologist and microbiologist

Kenneth Vivian Thimann
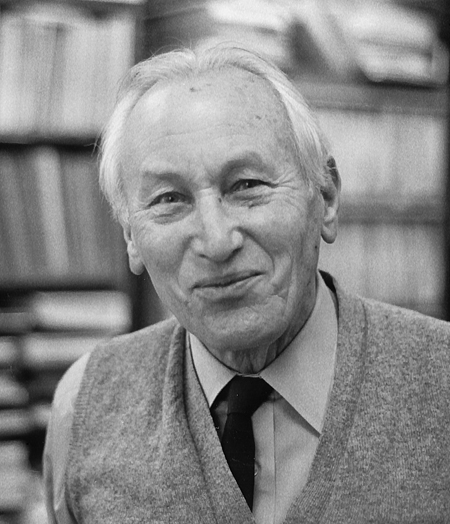
- Born: August 5, 1904; Ashford, Kent, England
- Died: January 15, 1997 (aged 92); Haverford, Pennsylvania, United States
- Monuments: Thimann Laboratories, University of California, Santa Cruz
- Spouse(s): Ann Mary Thimann, nee Augusta Mary Bateman (b.4/20/1905 d.1987)
- Children: Vivianne T. Nachmias, Karen T. Romer, Linda T. Dewing
- Parents: Israel Phoebus Thimann (father); Muriel Kate Harding Thimann (founder of the Ashford School) (mother)
- Relatives: Siblings: Ralph Thimann, Eric Thiman, and Ivor Cedric Thimann

Kenneth Vivian Thimann (August 5, 1904 – January 15, 1997) was an English-American plant physiologist and microbiologist known for his studies of plant hormones, which were widely influential in agriculture and horticulture. He isolated and determined the structure of auxin, the first known plant hormone. He spent most of his early career (1935–1965) at Harvard University, and his later career (1965–1989) at the University of California, Santa Cruz. He is credited with identifying indole-3-acetic acid as an auxin.

Thimann was born in Ashford, England. His older brother was the composer Eric Thiman. He studied chemistry and biochemistry at Imperial College, University of London (earning a B.Sc. and a Ph.D.) and also received a diploma from the University of Graz. After several years teaching at the University of London, Thimann moved to the California Institute of Technology in 1930. In 1935, he joined the Biology department of Harvard University. He authored an influential book on plant hormones, Phytohormones, in 1937 (co-authored with F. W. Went). He was elected to the American Academy of Arts and Sciences in 1938. Thimann became director of Harvard's Biological Laboratories in 1946, a position he held until 1950. He was elected to the United States National Academy of Sciences in 1948. In 1955 he wrote The Life of Bacteria, an influential book on microbiology. He was elected to the American Philosophical Society in 1959. From 1962 until leaving Harvard in 1965, Thimann was the Higgins Professor of Biology.

Thimann moved to University of California, Santa Cruz (UCSC) in 1965—the year of its founding—to become the first provost of Crown College. At UCSC, he was largely responsible for building the science departments of the new university. He also played a central role in fostering the UCSC Arboretum and its botanical collection. After retiring as provost in 1972, Thimann remained at UCSC until 1989, when he moved to Haverford, Pennsylvania. In 1977, he wrote Hormone Action in the Whole Life of Plants. He won the Balzan Prize in 1982 in recognition of his contributions to botany.

There is a lecture hall called Thimann Lecture Hall within the campus of UCSC.
