= Sally Miller Gearhart =

American novelist (1931–2021)

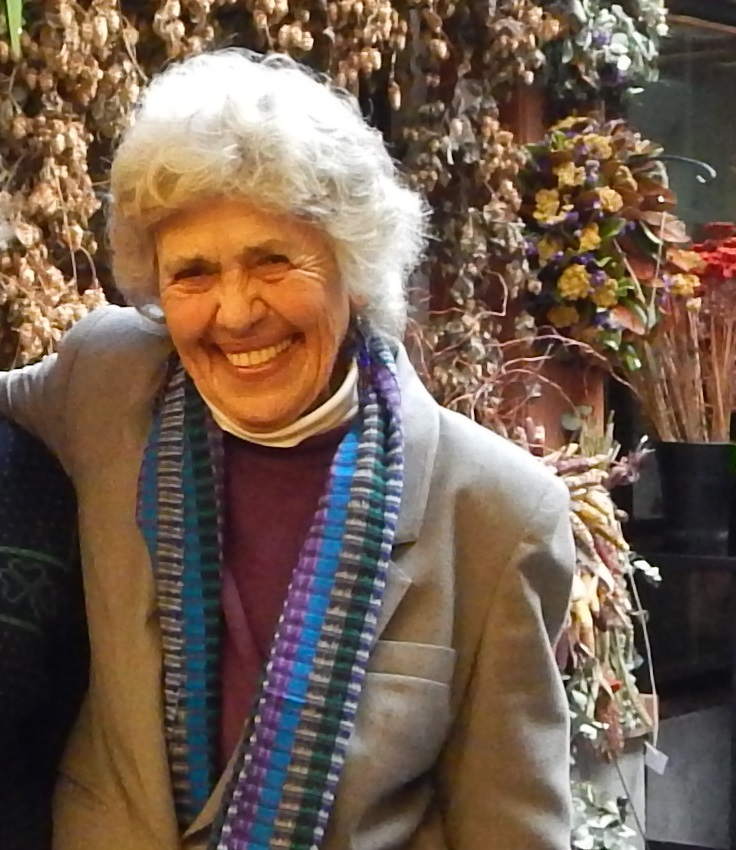
- Sally Miller Gearhart in Eugene, Oregon, November 2013
- Born: April 15, 1931; Pearisburg, Virginia, U.S.
- Died: July 14, 2021 (aged 90); Ukiah, California, U.S.
- Education: Sweet Briar College (BA); Bowling Green State University; University of Illinois Urbana-Champaign (PhD)
- Occupations: Educator, Novelist
- Writing career
- Genres: Science fiction, Feminist Theory, Gender Studies
- Website: sallymillergearhart.net

Sally Miller Gearhart (April 15, 1931 – July 14, 2021) was an American teacher, radical feminist, science-fiction writer, and political activist. In 1973, she became the first open lesbian to obtain a tenure-track faculty position when she was hired by San Francisco State University, where she helped establish one of the first women and gender study programs in the country. She later became a nationally known gay rights activist.

== Early life ==
Sally Miller Gearhart was born in Pearisburg, Virginia, in 1931 to Sarah Miller Gearhart and Kyle Montague Gearhart. Her mother was a secretary, and her father was a dentist. After the pair divorced early in her childhood, Gearhart moved to her maternal grandmother's boarding house. There, she experienced female camaraderie and developed an admiration for "the collective strength of women."

Gearhart attended an all-women's institution, Sweet Briar College, near Lynchburg, Virginia. She graduated with a Bachelor of Arts in drama and English in 1952. At Bowling Green State University, she obtained a master's degree in theater and public address in 1953. She continued on at University of Illinois at Urbana-Champaign, getting her Ph.D. in theater in 1956, with the intent of pursuing a life of academia.

== Teaching ==
Gearhart began teaching speech and theater at Stephen F. Austin State University in Nacogdoches, Texas, and later moved to Texas Lutheran College (now University) in Seguin, Texas. In both positions, Gearhart lived in the closet and hid her true sexual identity to fit with the culture of the schools. As a professor, she was incredibly popular and sought-after, but her personal life was full of the struggles of living in the closet. She found herself subject to blackmail attempts, and as a result, she publicly denied her sexuality.

In 1969, Gearhart followed a lover to Kansas. The following year, she moved to San Francisco with no plan aside from her determination to live openly as a lesbian.

By 1973, Gearhart was employed at San Francisco State University, where she went from teaching speech to teaching women's studies. There, she was able to develop one of the first women and gender studies programs in the United States. With her help, the university was the first to develop a course dealing with sex roles and communications. She continued at San Francisco State University until her retirement in 1992.

== Activism ==
After Gearhart received tenure from San Francisco State, she became politically active, fighting in particular for radical feminist causes.

In 1978, Gearhart fought alongside Harvey Milk, one of the first openly gay politicians in the U.S., to defeat California Proposition 6, known as the "Briggs Initiative". Gearhart famously debated John Briggs, attacking the initiative to ban homosexuals from academic positions in public schools. A clip of the debate appeared in the documentary film The Times of Harvey Milk, which also included Gearhart talking about working with Milk against Proposition 6, and reactions in San Francisco in the aftermath of Milk's assassination.

In the mid-1970s, Gearhart was co-chair of The Council On Religion And The Homosexual. This organization offered a variety of speaking events and literature to educate followers on the Judeo-Christian tradition. It also educated legislators about the lifestyles of lesbian, gay, bisexual, and transgender people.

Gearhart was also featured in several documentaries, including Word Is Out: Stories of Some of Our Lives, released in 1977, and "Last Call at Maud's" released in 1993. She appeared briefly in Barbara Hammer's 1975 short film "Superdyke".

Throughout her career, Gearhart fought for animal rights and became involved with ecologically based causes and the women's spirituality movement.

Gearhart labeled herself "a recovering political activist."

== Writing ==
In 1974, she co-authored with United Church of Christ pastor William R. Johnson the book Loving Women/Loving Men: Gay Liberation and the Church, which argued that marriage is a covenant relationship, regardless of gender.

In 1976, Gearhart co-wrote A Feminist Tarot with Susan Rennie. It was published by Persephone Press and used conventional Rider–Waite–Smith imagery. This book was one of several tarot divination books on the market attempting to find alternative meanings within the symbology, the most famous of which is probably Motherpeace. Unusual for a work of feminist spirituality at a time of goddess worship, this book reinterpreted and subverted the stated meanings of the Rider Waite Smith deck.

While living in San Francisco, Gearhart began writing feminist science-fiction novels and short stories that highlighted her utopian ideals for a wider lesbian audience. In 1978, her most famous novel, The Wanderground, was published, exploring themes of ecofeminism and lesbian separatism. She wrote two books as part of the Earthkeep trilogy, The Kanshou, published in 2002, and The Magister, published in 2003. Both stories explore a dystopian world where women outnumber men, and humans are the only beings on the planet. Because of her collaboration with feminist presses like Persephone Press and engagement with themes of feminist separatism and lesbian feminism, Gearhart is associated with the women in print movement, an effort by second-wave feminists to establish autonomous communications networks of feminist periodicals, presses, and bookstores created by and for women. Gearhart's novel The Wanderground inspired the name of the Wanderground Lesbian Archive and Library in Cranston, Rhode Island, which collects New England lesbian works with a focus on the women in print movement.

In 1979, Gearhart published in the journal Women’s Studies International Quarterly, issue 2, which included the essay “The Womanization of Rhetoric”, which could be considered the first feminist essay to reject rhetoric's key principle of persuasion, declaring that “Any intent to persuade is an act of violence” (195). With this, she separated rhetoric from ideas of domination, conquering, and often violence. In the essay, she called this new, domination-free rhetoric "invitational rhetoric".

Of all the human disciplines, [rhetoric] has gone about its task of educating others to violence with the most audacity. The fact that it has done so with language and metalanguage, with refined functions of the mind, instead of with whips or rifles does not excuse it from the mindset of the violent. (195)

In her early career, Gearhart took part in a series of seminars at San Francisco State University, where feminist scholars were critically discussing issues of rape, slavery, and the possibility of nuclear annihilation. Gearhart outlines a three-step proposal for female-led social change from her essay, "The Future–-If There Is One–-is Female":

I) Every culture must begin to affirm a female future.
II) Species responsibility must be returned to women in every culture.
III) The proportion of men must be reduced to and maintained at approximately 10% of the human race.

Gearhart does not base this radical proposal on the idea that men are innately violent or oppressive, but rather on the "real danger is in the phenomenon of male-bonding, that commitment of groups of men to each other whether in an army, a gang, a service club, a lodge, a monastic order, a corporation, or a competitive sport." Gearhart identifies the self-perpetuating, male-exclusive reinforcement of power within these groups as corrosive to female-led social change. Thus, if "men were reduced in number, the threat would not be so great and the placement of species responsibility with the female would be assured."

Gearhart, a dedicated pacifist, recognized that this kind of change could not be achieved through mass violence. On the critical question of how women could achieve this, Gearhart argues that it is by women's own capacity for reproduction that the ratio of men to women can be changed through the technologies of cloning or ovular merging, both of which would only produce female births. She argues that as women take advantage of these reproductive technologies, the sex ratio would change over generations.

Daphne Patai in her book Heterophobia: Sexual Harassment and the Future of Feminism summarizes Gearhart's essay as, "The future must be in female hands, women alone must control the reproduction of species; and only 10% of the population should be allowed to be male".

Mary Daly supported Gearhart's proposals, stating: "I think it's not a bad idea at all. If life is to survive on this planet, there must be a decontamination of the Earth. I think this will be accompanied by an evolutionary process that will result in a drastic reduction of the population of males."

=== Works ===
- Some Modern American Concepts of Tragic Drama as Revealed by the Critical Writings of Twentieth Century American Playwrights (1953)
- Aristotle and Modern Theorists on the Elements of Tragedy. (1956)
- The Lesbian and God-the-Father, or, All the Church Needs Is a Good Lay ... On Its Side (1972)
- Loving Women/Loving Men: Gay Liberation and the Church (1974)
- A Feminist Tarot (1976)
- The Wanderground (1978)
- "The Sword and the Vessel Versus the Lake on the Lake" (1979)
- "The Future – If There Is One – Is Female" (1981)
- “Future Visions: Today’s Politics: Feminist Utopias in Review” (1994)
- The Kanshou (2002)
- The Magister (2003)

== Personal life ==
Gearhart knew from the age of ten that she would have no children, and in college, she discovered that she was a lesbian. She read lesbian novels but destroyed them early in her career as she did not want her sexual identity revealed.

Her partner was Jane Gurko, a fellow professor at San Francisco State University, until the latter's death in 2010.

Gearhart spent her later years in Willits, a small town situated in the heart of Mendocino County's "Redwood country" in northern California, before moving to a care home in nearby Ukiah. After a long illness, she died in Ukiah on July 14, 2021, at the age of 90.

Although she did not adopt the Christian faith, Gearhart acknowledged the influence of Christianity on her life.

== Legacy ==
The Sally Miller Gearhart Fund for lesbian studies was established by Carla Blumberg, one of Gearhart's former students, in January 2008 at the University of Oregon. It was created to promote research and teaching in lesbian studies through an annual lecture series and an endowed professorship at the university. The first lecture was given by Arlene Stein of Rutgers University on May 27, 2009, and it was titled The Incredibly Shrinking Lesbian World and Other Queer Conundra.

The Sally Miller Gearhart Papers (1956–1999) are held at the Special Collections and University Archives, University of Oregon Libraries.

Gearhart is an entry in the 2003 dictionary-like book The A to Z of the Lesbian Liberation Movement: Still the Rage, by JoAnne Myers.

Gearhart was portrayed by Carrie Preston in the 2017 miniseries When We Rise, which dealt with the evolution of the LGBT community in San Francisco and advancement of LGBT civil rights in America.

Sally!, a feature documentary about Gearhart directed by documentarian Deborah Craig premiered in June 2024.
