= Di Vilde Chayes =

American Jewish feminist collective

- Founded: 1982
- Dissolved: 1983
- Purpose: Jewish feminism, Lesbian feminism, Zionism
- Location: New York City

Di Vilde Chayes (English: The Wild Beasts) was a New York-based secular Jewish lesbian feminist collective that examined and responded to antisemitism and Middle Eastern politics. The collective spoke out against antisemitism in the lesbian and feminist movements and critiqued anti-Zionist activists.

== History ==
The name of the organization is a Yiddish term for wild beasts. Most members were Ashkenazi. The collective held that Jewish women's liberation required the overthrow of patriarchal institutions within Jewish communities, and that it was necessary to develop Jewish feminist institutions and enterprises. The collective was founded by Melanie Kaye/Kantrowitz, Adrienne Rich, Irena Klepfisz, Evelyn Beck, Gloria Greenfield, Bernice Mennis, Nancy K. Bereano, and others. Di Vilde Chayes supported the existence of the State of Israel as a Jewish state, but were critical of Israel's mistreatment of Palestinians and the Israeli occupation of Palestinian land. Di Vilde Chayes rejected the claim that "Zionism is racism" (in part by claiming that the majority of Israeli Jews are people of color), aligned themselves with the Israeli Zionist left, and believed that anti-Zionism was a smokescreen for antisemitism.

Di Vilde Chayes suspended its operations in 1983. Kaye/Kantrowitz and other activists continued to work in Jewish leftist circles, advocating for Palestinian solidarity and criticizing policies of the Israeli government.

== Legacy ==
A chapter on Di Vilde Chayes is included in Joyce Antler's book Jewish Radical Feminism: Voices from the Women's Liberation Movement. The 1982 anthology Nice Jewish Girls included essays from nearly every member of Di Vilde Chayes. Irena Klepfisz has expressed her embarrassment over her involvement in the group, deeming other Jewish feminist groups such as the Jewish Women's Committee to End the Occupation of the West Bank to be more successful despite being less known than Di Vilde Chayes.

== See also ==
- Jewish left
