= Hattie Gossett =

American poet (born 1942)

- Born: April 11, 1942 (age 84); New Jersey, U.S.
- Education: New York University
- Occupations: Playwright, poet, editor
- Notable work: Presenting...Sister Noblues (1988)

Hattie Gossett (born April 11, 1942) is an African-American feminist playwright, poet and magazine editor. Her work focuses on bolstering the self-esteem of young black women.

== Life and career ==
Born in New Jersey on April 11, 1942, Gossett gained a Master of Fine Arts degree from New York University in 1993, where she was a Yip Harburg Fellow. She was a David Randolph Distinguished Artist-in-Residence at The New School in 2001.

Gossett was "involved in the planning stages" of Essence magazine, which was first published in 1970, and she was an early participant in the Kitchen Table: Women of Color Press collective founded in 1980 by Audre Lorde and Barbara Smith. Gossett was also a staff editor with True Story, Redbook, McCall's and black theater magazines, and subsequently taught and did workshops on writing, black literature, and black music at Rutgers University, SUNY Empire State College, Oberlin College, and elsewhere. At Rutgers, she and Barbara Masekela created one of the first courses on writings by African-American and African women.

Gossett's poetry collection Presenting...Sister Noblues was published by Firebrand Books in 1988. Her poem "between a rock and a hard place" is incorporated into the dance work Shelter by Jawole Willa Jo Zollar, as performed by the Alvin Ailey American Dance Theater beginning in 1995. Gossett contributed a slave narrative style reading to the Andrea E. Woods dance Rememorabilia, Scraps From Out a Tin Can, Everybody Has Some. She is also the author of the book the immigrant suite: hey xenophobe! Who you calling foreigner? (2007).

Her work has appeared in many publications, including Artforum, Black Scholar, The Village Voice, Conditions, Essence, Jazz Spotlite News, Pleasure and Danger: Exploring Female Sexuality, This Bridge Called My Back, and Daughters of Africa.

== Publications ==
- Presenting...Sister Noblues, Firebrand Books, 1988, ISBN 978-0932379498
- the immigrant suite: hey xenophobe! who you calling foreigner?, Seven Stories Press, 2007, ISBN 978-1583227787
