= College Nine =

Residential college of the University of California, Santa Cruz

Coordinates: 37.001347°N 122.057593°W

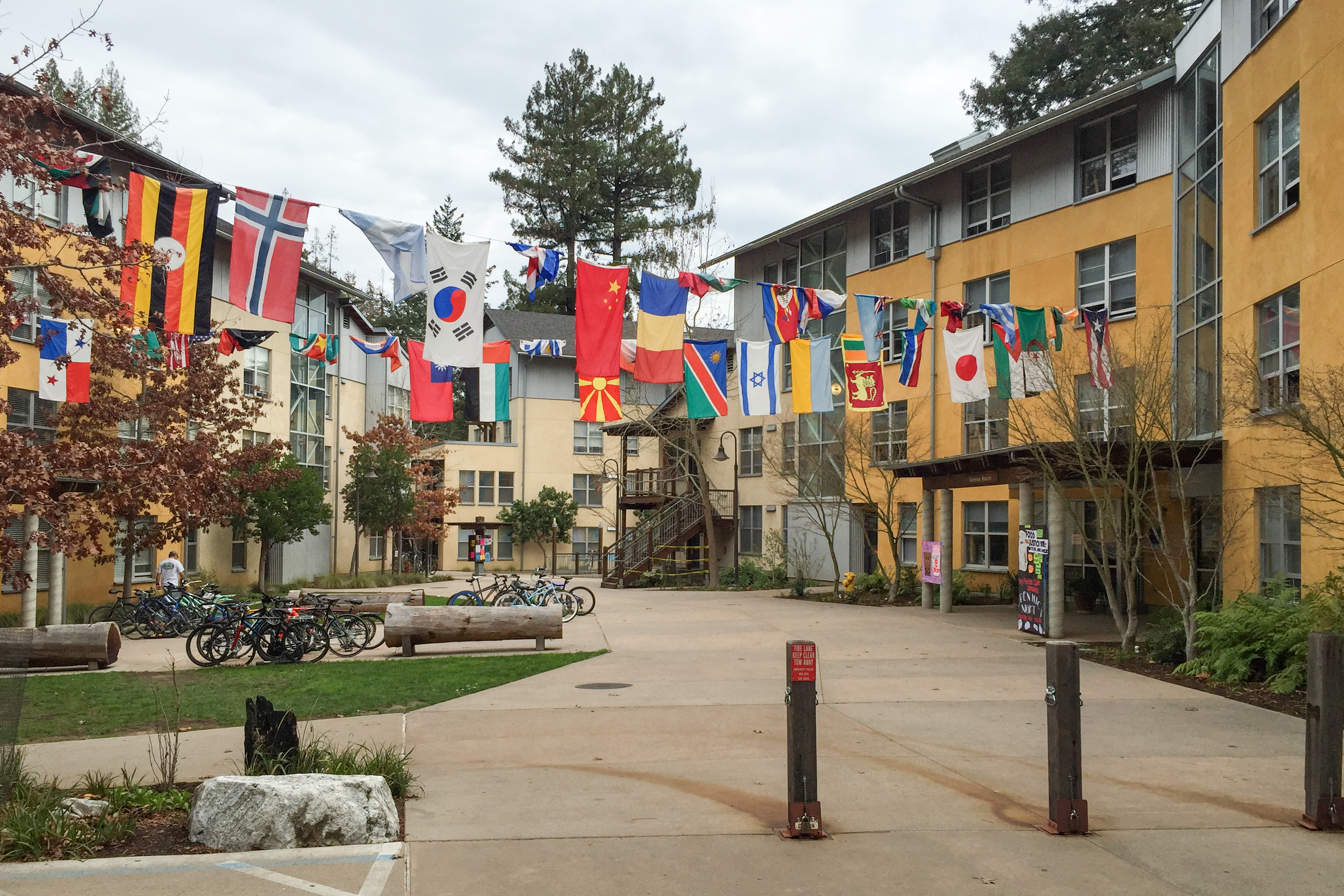
- Motto: International and Global Perspectives
- Type: Residential college
- Established: 2000
- Provost: Flora Lu
- Undergraduates: 1205
- Location: University of California; 1156 High Street; Santa Cruz, CA 95064, (United States) Santa Cruz, California
- Campus: Suburban/Sylvan
- Colors: UCSC Blue; UCSC Gold
- Website: www.collegenine.ucsc.edu/

College Nine is a residential college at the University of California, Santa Cruz. The university's first new college in nearly 30 years, College Nine was founded in 2000 although the dorms were not finished until 2002. It is located on the north side of campus, east of Science Hill and west of Crown College. The college theme is International and Global Perspectives. All freshmen students are required to take a core course on this particular theme.

College Nine is composed of three residence halls (R1, R2, and R3); in the spring of 2006 the residence halls were renamed to emphasize and reflect the college's theme. As of Fall 2006, the new residence hall names are Hague House, Gandhi House, and Geneva House. These names however are temporary names and are subject to change once the college finds a benefactor.

In the LRDP (Long Range Development Plan) for UCSC, Colleges 9 and John R. Lewis will be situated as the very center of UCSC by 2025.

College Nine is also home to the International Living Center (ILC). The ILC is home to nearly a third of international students visiting UCSC while on study abroad and provides a space where international, transfer and domestic students coexist in apartment-style living. There also exists three International RAs as well as its own Coordinator for Residential Education.
