= Mirtha N. Quintanales =

Cuban feminist and writer (1948–2022)

Mirtha Quintanales was a Cuban lesbian feminist, writer, and a professor at New Jersey City University. Her short writing piece "I come with no Illusions" was featured in the feminist anthology This Bridge Called My Back.

== Early life ==
Born in Cuba in 1948, Mirtha Natacha Quintanales immigrated to the United States from Cuba at the age of 13 on April 2, 1962. She died in November 2022.

== Bibliography ==
- This Bridge Called My Back (1981)
- Telling to Live (2001)
