= Carole McCann =

Carole McCann is a professor and Chair in Gender and Women's Studies at the University of Maryland, Baltimore County (UMBC). McCann was Director of the program from 1998-2005 and 2008-2014 when the program transitioned to be a department. For the 2017-208 school year, McCann was awarded UMBC's Lipitz Professorship.

McCann is the author of Birth Control Politics in the United States, 1916-1945 and co-editor of Feminist Theory Reader: Local and Global Perspectives along with Seung-Kyung Kim. The Feminist Theory Reader was updated with new material for a second edition, and was rereleased by Routledge in July 2009. A third edition was published in June 2013.
