= Penny A. Weiss =

American professor of women's and gender studies

Penny A. Weiss is professor at Saint Louis University known for her work on feminist issues.

== Education and career ==
Weiss has a B.A. from the University of South Florida (1976), an M.A. (1979) and a Ph.D. (1987) from the University of Notre Dame. Starting in 1985 she was an assistant professor at the University of South Carolina, and in 1987 she moved to Purdue University where she remained until 2008. While at Purdue, Weiss spoke out about unequal treatment of women faculty at the university, and the challenges faced by female faculty at Purdue. In 2008 she became a professor at Saint Louis University, where she was chair of the Department of Women's and Gender Studies from 2008 until 2012.

== Selected publications ==
- Sowaal, Alice; Weiss, Penny A., eds. (2016). Feminist interpretations of Mary Astell. University Park, Pennsylvania. ISBN 978-0-271-07760-4. OCLC 949276358.
- Weiss, Penny A. (2015). Canon Fodder : Historical Women Political Thinkers. Penn State Press. ISBN 978-0-271-06280-8. OCLC 1256437921.
- Weiss, Penny A. (1993). Gendered Community: Rousseau, Sex, and Politics. NYU Press. ISBN 978-0-8147-9491-3.
- Weiss, Penny A.; Friedman, Marilyn (1995). Feminism and Community. Temple University Press. ISBN 978-1-56639-277-8.
- Weiss, Penny A. (2021). Feminist reflections on childhood ahistory and a call to action. Temple University Press. ISBN 978-1-4399-1868-5. OCLC 1252063676.
