= John R. Lewis College =

Residential college of the University of California, Santa Cruz

Coordinates: 37.00072°N 122.058476°W

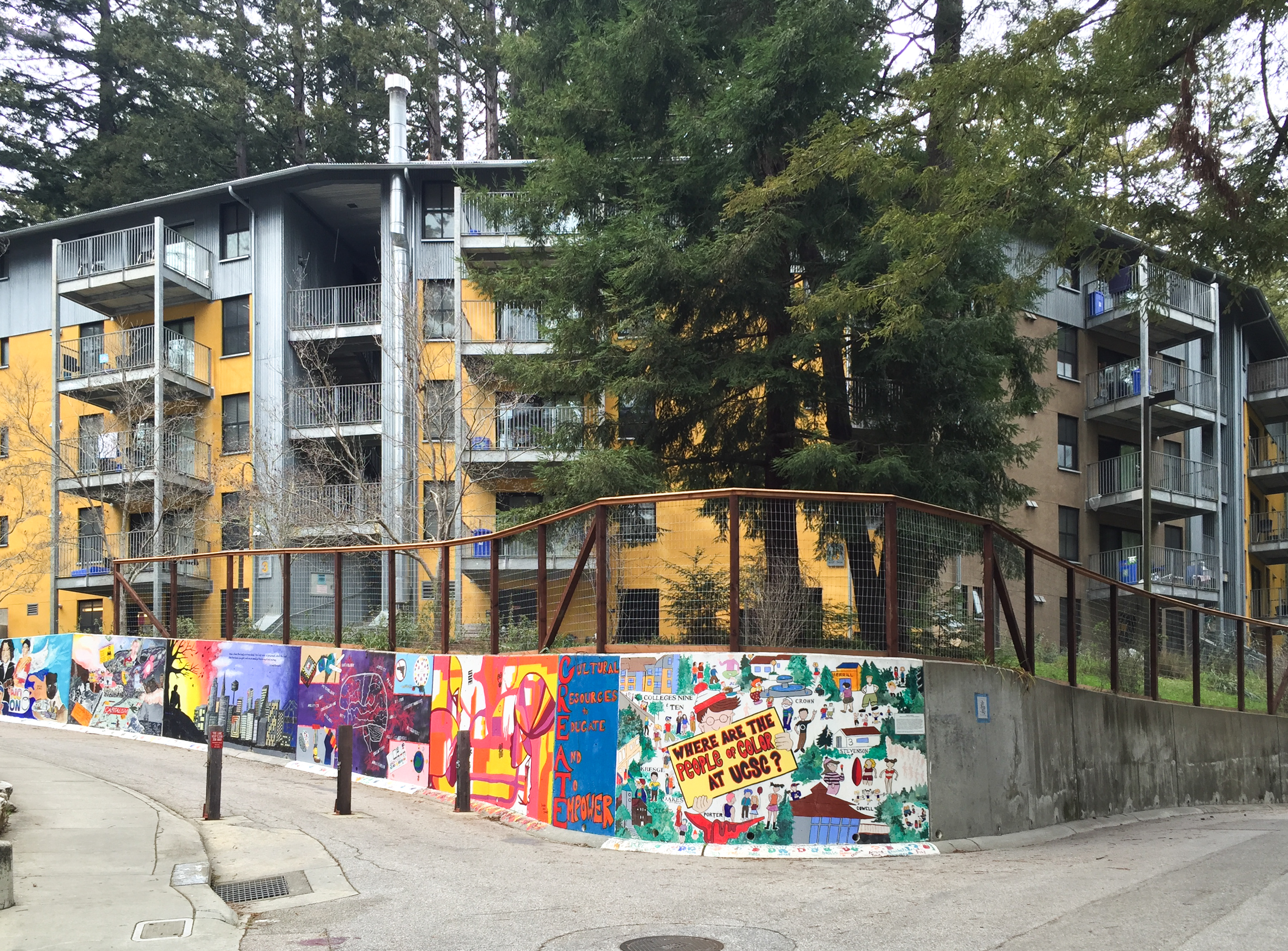
- Motto: Social Justice and Community
- Type: Residential college
- Established: 2002
- Provost: Flora Lu
- Undergraduates: 1522
- Location: (United States) Santa Cruz, California
- Campus: Suburban/Sylvan
- Colors: UCSC Blue; UCSC Gold
- Website: John R Lewis College

John R. Lewis College, formerly known as College Ten, is one of the ten residential colleges at the University of California, Santa Cruz. It is on the north side of campus, west of College Nine and north of the Cowell Student Health Center. The theme of its freshman core course is Social Justice and Community.

John R. Lewis College is home to the University Center, a conference center located above the Dining Commons, and the Terry Freitas cafe, a student-run co-op cafe named after UCSC-alumni Terry Freitas, who was murdered in Colombia due to his work with the U'wa people to stop oil companies from drilling on U'wa land.

In 2010, students and staff worked together to name the three residential halls. They are called Angela Davis House, after the American political activist and UCSC professor, Angela Davis; Ohlone House, after the native Ohlone people who are indigenous to the region; and Amnesty House, after Amnesty International and their work for human rights.

John R. Lewis College was founded in 2002 as College Ten, making it the newest UCSC college as of May 2017. On October 27, 2021, Chancellor Cynthia Larive announced that the university will be renaming College Ten after civil rights leader Rep. John Lewis. The name change was made official in Spring 2022.
