= Judit Moschkovich =

Judit Nora Moschkovich is a professor in mathematics education and the learning sciences at the University of California, Santa Cruz.

Moschkovich's research uses sociocultural approaches to study mathematical thinking and learning, mathematical discourse, and language issues in mathematics education. Her research has focused on the transition from arithmetic to algebraic thinking, mathematical discourse, and learning/teaching mathematics in classrooms with students who are bilingual, Latino/a, and/or learning English.
