= Irena Klepfisz =

Polish-American author, activist (born 1941)

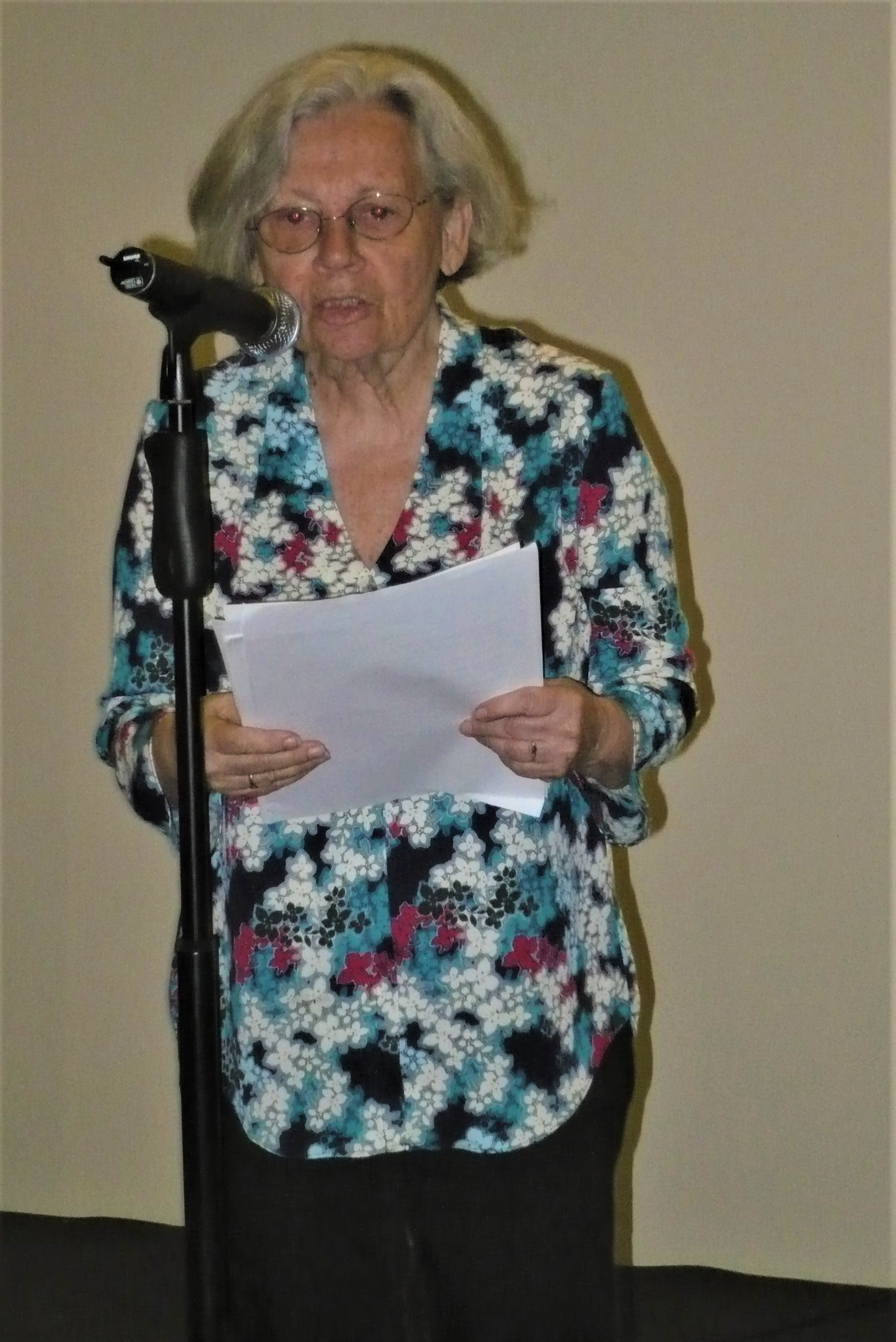
- Irena Klepfisz
- Born: April 17, 1941 (age 85); Warsaw Ghetto, Warsaw, German-occupied Poland
- Education: City College of New York; University of Chicago (Ph.D.)
- Partner: Judith Waterman (1936-2014)
- Father: Michał Klepfisz

Irena Klepfisz (born April 17, 1941) is a Jewish lesbian author, academic and activist.

== Early life ==
Klepfisz was born in the Warsaw Ghetto on April 17, 1941, the daughter of Michał Klepfisz, a member of the Jewish Labour Bund (Yiddish: der algemeyner yidisher arbeter bund), and his wife, Rose Klepfisz (née Shoshana Perczykow; 1914–2016). In late April 1943, when she had just turned two years old, her father was killed on the second day of the Warsaw Ghetto Uprising (Yiddish: varshever geto oyfshtand).

Earlier in 1943, Klepfisz's father had smuggled Irena and her mother out of the ghetto; Irena was placed in a Catholic orphanage, while her mother, using false papers, worked as a maid for a Polish family. After the uprising, her mother retrieved her from the orphanage and fled with her into the Polish countryside, where they survived the Second World War by hiding and concealing their Jewish identities, aided by Polish peasants. After the war, the remaining family moved briefly to Łódź before moving to Sweden in 1946. Irena and her mother immigrated to the United States in 1949.

== Education ==
Klepfisz attended City College of New York, and studied with distinguished Yiddish linguist Max Weinreich, a founder of the YIVO Institute for Jewish Research. Klepfisz graduated CCNY with honors in English and Yiddish.

In 1963, she attended the University of Chicago to do graduate work in English Literature. Irena Klepfisz received a Ph.D. in English in 1970.

Irena Klepfisz has taught English, Yiddish, and Women's Studies. In 2018, she retired from her position as a professor at Barnard in New York City.

== Yiddishist ==
Today Klepfisz is known as a Yiddishist, but her מאַמע־לשון (mame-loshn, literally "mother tongue") was Polish; as a child she also learned Swedish. She began to learn Yiddish in Łódź in elementary school after the Second World War. She learned English after emigrating to the United States. In The Tribe of Dina: A Jewish Women's Anthology, which she co-edited with Melanie Kaye/Kantrowitz, Klepfisz describes the experience, up to age 16 or 17, of having "no language in which I was completely rooted".

Irena is well known for her translations of Yiddish poets Kadya Molodowsky and Fradl Shtok.

== Activism ==
Klepfisz has worked as an activist in feminist, lesbian, and secular Jewish communities. She was active in New Jewish Agenda (1980–1992) and was the last executive director, laid off in 1992. She is also co-founder of The Jewish Women's Committee to End the Occupation of the West Bank and Gaza (JWCEO). Along with Nancy Bereano, Evelyn T. Beck, Bernice Mennis, Adrienne Rich, and Melanie Kaye/Kantrowitz, Irena Klepfisz was a member of Di Vilde Chayes (English: The Wild Beasts), a Jewish feminist group that examined and responded to political issues in the Middle East, as well as antisemitism.

She is the recipient of the 2016 Adrienne Cooper Dreaming in Yiddish Award.

== Publishing ==
Klepfisz began publishing her poems in 1971. She was a founding editor of Conditions, a feminist magazine emphasizing the writing of lesbians, and also was a co-editor of The Tribe of Dina: A Jewish Women's Anthology (the other co-editor was Melanie Kaye/Kantrowitz). Klepfisz has also been a contributor to the Jewish feminist magazine Bridges, and wrote the introduction to Found Treasures: Stories by Yiddish Women Writers. A collection of Klepfisz's poetry and prose was published under the title Different Enclosures in 1985.

She also authored an essay collection, Dreams of an Insomniac: Jewish Feminist Essays, Speeches and Diatribes, published by The Eighth Mountain Press. She is the author of A Few Words in the Mother Tongue: Poems Selected and New (with an introduction by Adrienne Rich), published by The Eighth Mountain Press, which was nominated for a Lambda Prize in Poetry in 1990.

In the fall of 2022, Wesleyan University Press published Klepfisz's Her Birth and Later Years: Poems New and Collected 1971-2021, which won the 2023 Audre Lorde Award for Lesbian Poetry and was a finalist for The 2022 National Jewish Book Award in Poetry.

== External ==
- Jewish Women's Archive page
- Video interview with Yiddish Book Center
- Video interview/Reading w/Julie Enszer for YIVO, upon the release of "Her Birth and Later Years: New and Collected Poems, 1971-2021"
