= Joan Larkin =

American poet and playwright

- Born: 1939 (age 86–87); Boston, Massachusetts, U.S.
- Occupations: poet, writer, teacher
- Website: www.joanlarkin.com

Joan Larkin (born April 16, 1939, in Boston) is an American poet, writer, and teacher. She was active in the small press lesbian feminist publishing explosion of the 1970s, co-founding the independent publishing company Out & Out Books. The science fiction writer Donald Moffitt was her brother.

== Education and career ==
Joan Larkin earned a Bachelor of Arts degree at Swarthmore College, a Master of Arts degree in English at the University of Arizona, and a Master of Fine Arts degree in playwriting at Brooklyn College.

Larkin has served on the faculties of Brooklyn College, Sarah Lawrence College, and Goddard College, and has served as Distinguished Visiting Poet at Columbia College Chicago and the core faculty of the Master of Fine Arts Program in Poetry Writing and Translation at Drew University.

Larkin was a visiting instructor (poet-in-residence) at West Side YMCA Writers Community in New York from 1994 to 1996. In 1975, she co-founded the independent small press Out & Out Books and co-edited the anthologies Amazon Poetry and Lesbian Poetry (with Elly Bulkin).

== Works and themes ==
Joan Larkin's poetry collections include Old Stranger, Blue Hanuman, My Body: New and Selected Poems, Housework, A Long Sound, Sor Juana's Love Poems (translated with Jaime Manrique), and Cold River.

Her writing includes The Hole in the Sheet, a Klezmer musical farce, and two books of daily meditations in the Hazelden recovery series: If You Want What We Have and Glad Day. The Living, her verse play about AIDS, has been produced at festivals in Boston and New York.

== Literary prizes ==
Larkin was the 2011 recipient of the Academy of American Poets Fellowship. She also received the Poetry Society of America's 2011 Shelley Memorial Award, with Rigoberto González as co-recipient of the award. She received the Publishing Triangle's 2008 Audre Lorde Award for Lesbian Poetry, for her book My Body: New and Selected Poems. In addition, Larkin received the Lambda Literary Award for Poetry twice, in 1989 (for Gay and Lesbian Poetry in Our Time, with Carl Morse) and in 1997 (for Cold River). Her anthology of coming out stories, A Woman Like That, was nominated for a Publishing Triangle award and a Lambda Literary Award for Nonfiction in 2000. She served as poetry editor for the first three years of the queer literary journal Bloom. She was co-editor, with David Bergman, of the Living Out autobiography series at the University of Wisconsin Press. Her other awards include fellowships in poetry and playwriting from the Massachusetts Cultural Council (1995), New York Foundation for the Arts, and the National Endowment for the Arts (1987–1988), as well as a Creative Artists public service grant from the New York State Council on the Arts in 1976 and in 1980.

== Bibliography ==
=== Poetry ===
- Housework (Out & Out Books, 1975) ISBN 0-918314-02-X
- A Long Sound (Granite Press, 1986) ISBN 0-9614886-1-1
- Cold River (Painted Leaf Press, 1997) ISBN 0-9651558-5-4
- Sor Juana's Love Poems/ Poemas de Amor (in Spanish and English, with Jaime Manrique; Painted Leaf Press, 1997) ISBN 0-9651558-6-2, (reprinted, University of Wisconsin Press, 2003) ISBN 0-299-18704-7
- My Body: New and Selected Poems (Hanging Loose Press, 2007) ISBN 978-1-931236-74-4
- Legs Tipped With Small Claws (Argos Books Chapbook, 2012) ISBN 978-1-938247-01-9
- Blue Hanuman (Hanging Loose Press, 2014) ISBN 978-1-934909-38-6
- Old Stranger (Alice James Books, 2024) ISBN 978-1-949944-64-8

=== Nonfiction ===
- If You Want What We Have: Sponsorship Meditations (Hazelden, 1998) ISBN 978-1-56838-192-3
- Glad Day: Daily Meditations for Gay, Lesbian, Bisexual, and Transgender People (Hazelden, 1998) ISBN 978-1-56838-189-3

=== Fiction ===
- "The Enemy," The Kenyon Review, Vol. XLVIII, Number 1, 2026
- "A Moment In Paradise," Altered Reality (Online), July 10, 2024
- "If There's Anything We Can Do," The Jewish Literary Journal (Online), Issue 118, April 2023
- "Minnow and Boots," ImageOutWrite, Volume 9, September 2020 ISBN 978-1-71661-982-3

=== Collections edited ===
- Amazon Poetry: An Anthology (with Elly Bulkin, Out & Out Books, 1975) ISBN 0-918314-07-0
- Lesbian Poetry: An Anthology (with Elly Bulkin, Persephone Press, 1981) ISBN 0-930436-08-3
- Gay and Lesbian Poetry in Our Time: An Anthology (with Carl Morse, St. Martin's Press, 1988) ISBN 0-312-02213-1
- A Woman Like That: Lesbian and Bisexual Writers Tell their Coming Out Stories (Avon/Bard Books, 1999) ISBN 978-0-380-80247-0
- Living Out: Gay and Lesbian Autobiographies (with David Bergman and Raphael Kadushin, Painted Leaf Press)
- The Women Writers Calendar (Crossing Press, 1982–1984)

=== Recordings ===
- A Sign I Was Not Alone (LP recording of poets Adrienne Rich, Honor Moore, Audre Lorde, Joan Larkin, New York: Out & Out Books, 1980)

=== Limited editions ===
- ‘’A Garden,’’ letterpress broadside (Center for Book Arts, NYC, 2005)
- ‘’Waste Not,’’ letterpress broadside (Bridge Press, Vermont, 2005)
- ‘’Boston Piano,’’ Belladonna limited edition poetry chapbook (June 2003)
- ‘’Hard Differences,’’ letterpress broadside, American Populist Poetry Series (1980)

=== Plays: staged readings, productions, publication ===
- The AIDS Passion, staged reading, Mount Holyoke College, April 1995
- The Living, staged reading, Huntington Theater Company, Boston, December 1996; full production, Brooklyn Arts Exchange, June 2000
- The Hole in the Sheet, book and lyrics for a klezmer musical farce, music by Steve Elson (seeking production)
- Wiretap, Jean Cocteau Repertory Theater, NYC, December 2001, staged reading by Brooklyn College Theater Department
- Brother Dust, a hip-hop version of Sophocles' Antigone (seeking production)
- "If You Were Going to Get A Pet," Kindergarde: Avant-garde Poems, Plays, Stories, and Songs for Children, edited by Dana Teen Lomax (Black Radish Books, San Francisco, 2013)
