= New Jewish Agenda =

U.S. Jewish membership organization

New Jewish Agenda (NJA) was a multi-issue membership organization active in the United States between 1980 and 1992 and made up of about 50 local chapters. NJA's slogan was "a Jewish voice among progressives and a progressive voice among Jews." New Jewish Agenda demonstrated commitment to participatory (grassroots) democracy and civil rights for all people, especially those marginalized within the mainstream Jewish community. NJA was most controversial for its stances on the rights of Palestinians and Lesbian and Gay Jews.

== History ==
Over 1,200 people attended NJA's founding conference on December 25, 1980, representing members of Orthodox, Conservative, Reconstructionist, and Reform, synagogues. The date was purposely chosen to coincide with Christmas. At the founding conference, a 25-member Executive Committee (EC) was elected. The EC agreed that the straw-poll resolutions should function as guides and not mandates of NJA policy, and proposed establishing taskforces for each proposal area.

Many of the original members were Jewish organizers active in movements for peace and de-militarization, civil-liberties, civil rights, women's liberation, and those critical of Israeli policies. New Jewish Agenda used specifically Jewish cultural symbols and gatherings in their organizing, a common strategy in our current political era. For example, NJA wrote and revised Jewish prayers and High Holy Day services to reflect Feminist, Secular, and other non-traditional Jewish communities. They also used Jewish ritual in protest – for example, the Disarmament taskforce built a sukkah across the street from the White House. Though NJA members identified their activism as explicitly Jewish, they were met with mixed and often critical response from the larger Jewish community.

At a November 28, 1982 Delegates Conference in NYC, 65 elected representatives of NJA chapters and at-large members from across US, consented on a National Platform. The Platform included a general Statement of Purpose and specific statements on 18 issue areas.

=== Topic headings of each issue area ===
- Jewish Communal Life in the United States
- New Jewish Agenda's Feminist Commitment
- Women in the Work Force, Family, and Reproductive Rights
- Gay and Lesbian Jews
- Jews with Disabilities
- Anti-Semitism
- Racism
- Affirmative Action
- Civil Liberties
- Energy and Environment
- Economic Justice
- The Labor Movement
- Relations between Israel and North American Jewry
- Internal Social Life in Israel
- Israel, the Palestinians, and Arab Neighbors
- Israel and the International Community
- World Jewry and Threatened Jewish Communities (Soviet, Ethiopian, Argentine Jews)
- Militarism and the Nuclear Arms Race

== NJA campaigns ==
New Jewish Agenda maintained five primary campaigns through National Taskforces on Middle East Peace, Worldwide Nuclear Disarmament, Economic and Social Justice, Peace in Central America, and Jewish Feminism. Each taskforce coordinated work at the local and national level using organizing methods including national speaking tours, publications, newsletters, national taskforce gatherings, and conferences. Within many of the taskforces, and occasionally outside of the taskforces' wide subject areas, NJA members often established more focused Working Groups.

=== Economic and Social Justice Taskforce ===
New Jewish Agenda chapters around the country were active in coalitions to combat racism, anti-Semitism and apartheid. NJA sponsored vigils outside South African consulates in five U.S. cities which "received press from Seattle to Wash, DC and from Paris to Cape Town", according to a 1986 report-back. NJA also organized a six-week tour featuring one of South Africa's most prominent rabbis active in the anti-apartheid movement, Ben Isaacson, and a leading Black South African minister, Rev. Zachariah Mokgebo.

A conference on Anti-Semitism and Racism called "Carrying It On: Organizing Against Anti-Semitism and Racism for Jewish Activist and College Students" was held in Philadelphia in November 1991. Over 500 Jewish activists and allies from other communities gathered for workshops aiming to learn about and mobilize against institutionalized racism in the U.S. and to analyze the relationship between anti-Semitism and racism. Julian Bond, African-American SNCC founder, Georgia senator, and future chairman of the NAACP (1998–2010), offered a Keynote speech detailing the history of black-Jewish relations over the past 250 years in the U.S.

NJA organized the Jewish contingent for the 1983 20th Anniversary March on Washington for Jobs, Peace, and Freedom and a Friday night event (Shabbat service and celebration), which brought together over 500 people. The images of hundreds of Jews marching with a 24-foot banner that read "Justice, Justice Thou Shall Pursue" created an opportunity to build bridges and demonstrate commitment to the weekend's themes. The Friday night gathering included speeches by Martin Luther King III and Susannah Heschel (whose father, Rabbi Abraham Joshua Heschel, had been a close comrade of Dr. King).

=== Feminist Taskforce ===
Jewish Feminist leadership was part of NJA's culture from its earliest days, and the 1985 Conference passed a resolution to begin a Feminist Taskforce (FTF). The national FTF encouraged local chapters to form their own feminist taskforces and work on recruiting women to NJA who would be interested in that work. New Jewish Agenda's feminist taskforce was heavily influenced by the work of many non-Jewish feminists of color who had been challenging the white-dominated culture of the larger feminist movement, and making space for complicated conversations about overlapping identities. One of the FTF's projects was Gesher (Bridge), a newsletter that included reports from each chapter's FTF, and raised feminist issues within NJA. Gesher later became the Jewish Feminist journal Bridges, which continued to be published until June, 2011.

NJA sent a delegation to the UN Decade for Women Forum in 1985 in Nairobi. The delegation organized a successful feminist Jewish, African-American and Arab dialogue at the 1985 Forum. Also, at the Forum an Israeli-Jew and a Palestinian-Arab from the Gaza Strip spoke to a crowd of over 400. This was an especially meaningful achievement because the two previous UN Women's Forums had been divided over a "Zionism equals Racism" resolution. NJA was able to coordinate meetings at the Forum that led to the initiation of a Palestinian/Israeli women's organization. After the 1985 Forum, NJA attendees spoke around the country about the process and outcomes of organizing for it.

In 1985, NJA published and widely distributed a pamphlet called "Coming Out/Coming Home" about homophobia and gay rights within the Jewish community. They also spearheaded anti-homophobia work which included the development of workshops mobilizing the Jewish community to take part in many gay rights events. In April 1986, the Brooklyn and Manhattan chapters of NJA sponsored the first New York community-wide conference on Lesbian and Gay Jews. In 1987, NJA organized a Jewish contingent and Havdallah service at the October 12 March on Washington for gay rights. The day after that historic march, many took part in a civil disobedience action at the Supreme Court of the United States regarding the Hardwick decision (which ruled no legal privacy for gay sex) and for civil rights for people with AIDS.

At the National Taskforce meeting in September 1987, the FTF committed to talking about issues of "Family" as a two-year campaign, and went about the work of creating dialogue about both traditional and non-traditional families within the Jewish community. On Mother's Day 1988, the FTF convened a conference in Philadelphia on Women and Poverty. A panel discussion led by Adrienne Rich addressed the reality of high poverty rates among all women and discussed how stereotypes of Jewish wealth work to hide the poverty many Jewish women struggle with. A few days later, on May 19, 1988, the FTF put on a program in New York City called "No More Family Secrets: Now We're Talking", co-sponsored with the National Council of Jewish Women. The event started with a presentation talking about battered Jewish women and Jewish incest survivors.

The work of the Feminist Taskforce covered ground that overlapped with many of the other campaigns, and the FTF housed both the Gay/Lesbian Working Group and the AIDS Working Group. AIDS was always on the NJA agenda, especially as an issue to promote within Jewish communities. The AIDS Working Group was founded in July 1986 as a program of the FTF, and soon NJA Chapters reported AIDS activism at the local level. At the 1987 National Convention at UCLA, the AIDS Working Group presented a workshop on "AIDS in the Jewish community".

=== Middle East Peace Taskforce ===
Despite the New Jewish Agenda's emphasis on multi-issue organizing, The Middle East Task Force (METF) was central to NJA's work. NJA joined a field that was still deeply controversial and heated within the Jewish community. NJA was the only American Jewish organization that clearly opposed the 1982 Lebanon War from its onset. In June 1982, shortly after Agenda's founding, NJA took out a full-page New York Times ad criticizing and denouncing the Israeli invasion of Lebanon. Local chapters were able to mobilize first, including a public statement by NJA's Washington DC chapter two days after the June 6th Israeli invasion of Lebanon, a statement and protest vigil by the Massachusetts chapter, and a City Hall protest by Philadelphia NJA. NJA also organized town meetings featuring foreign policy expert Noam Chomsky.

In 1983, NJA circulated a petition for a "Freeze on Settlements in the West Bank". It was signed by 5,000 American Jews and enabled a public education campaign about the effects of settlement policies on the Middle East peace process. NJA then brought the Settlement Freeze petition to the General Assembly of the Council of Jewish Federations. New Jewish Agenda also led two intensive political study missions to Israel and the occupied territories in the summers of 1983 and 1984, meeting with academics, journalists and leading political figures. A later tour led to the creation of the 1991 video "This is the Moment: Israelis and Palestinians Talk".

NJA protested Israeli Prime Minister Menachem Begin when he spoke in Los Angeles in 1982. In November 1983, NJA protested Ariel Sharon at a Hebrew Academy banquet in San Francisco and over 2,000 demonstrators turned out. In 1985, NJA joined protests against violent anti-Arab activities in Los Angeles. In early 1988, NJA supported Israeli peace groups' mobilization of progressive representatives at the 31st World Zionist Congress (WZC). In the year before the WZC, NJA collected 650 new members for "Americans for Peace in Israel", the US affiliate of Mapam.

New Jewish Agenda and American Friends Service Committee (AFSC) co-sponsored a national speaking tour (in 1984) of Peace Now leader Mordechai Bar-on (a former IDF officer and member of Israeli Knesset) and Mohammed Milhem (deposed West Bank Palestinian Mayor), resulting in a PBS television special, "The Arab and the Israeli". These speaking tour dialogues were followed by local discussions between American Jewish and Arab communities. NJA also sponsored a tour of a founding member of the Committee Against the War in Lebanon and a member of the Israeli Committee in Solidarity with Bir Zeit University.

=== Worldwide Nuclear Disarmament Taskforce ===
NJA successfully lobbied a resolution to the 1982 General Assembly of the Council of Jewish Federations (CJF), for the passage of a multi-lateral nuclear arms freeze. The CJF resolution had powerful effects in the larger Jewish community, prompting other major Jewish organizations, including the American Jewish Congress and B'nai Brith, to issue similar statements. Arthur Waskow formed another Jewish organization, The Shalom Center, in 1983 to focus on peace and anti-nuclear activism from a Jewish perspective.

In 1981, observance of Tisha B'Av coincided with the anniversary of the atomic bombing of Nagasaki by the U.S. during World War II. The occasion was marked by NJA with traditional observance of Tisha B'Av near the White House and the Soviet Embassy. These were buildings symbolic of the nuclear super-powers, thus marking the shared symbolism of the potential danger of world-destruction. In 1984, NJA chapters sponsored scores of Sukkat Shalom (Shelter of Peace) and Rainbow Sign celebrations, linking traditional Jewish observances with the call for nuclear disarmament. NJA built a sukkah in Lafayette Park across from the White House in order to draw attention to their anti-nuclear organizing.

500 NJA members marched in the June 12, 1982 Disarmament Rally in New York, which was at that time the largest Disarmament Rally in American history. In 1985, NJA brought a large delegation to the Mobilization for Justice and Peace in Washington, DC. In 1986, NJA co-sponsored the Boston University conference "Judaism, War and the Nuclear Arms Race".

Following a 1986 Shalom Center Training Institute for disarmament activists, taskforce members became increasingly interested in making connections between disarmament and human rights issues, especially as applied to solidarity with Soviet Jewry, including participation in a demonstration on the Mall in Washington in December 1987, on the eve of a Ronald Reagan-Mikhail Gorbachev summit. At the time, Soviet Jews were facing anti-Semitism and political repression while struggling to emigrate in large numbers to the U.S. and Israel.

=== Central American Solidarity Taskforce ===
NJA sponsored a 1984 delegation of national Jewish leaders to Nicaragua to examine human rights conditions and investigate U.S. Government allegations of anti-Semitic policies pursued by the Sandinista government. The delegation came back with a report that the Sandinistas were not engaging in anti-Semitic behavior or policies and in fact that Nicaragua was willing to resume diplomatic talks with Israel and to oppose any forms of anti-Semitism. Through widespread publicity, the 1984 delegation was able to make great strides in discrediting the Reagan administration's attempts to mobilize the American Jewish community support for the Contras. NJA sent down many more delegations to Central America, joined with other peace groups for lobbying and speaking out against U.S. aid to the Contras, and represented the Jewish community in both the Pledge of Resistance coalition and the Inter-Religious Task Force on Central America.

NJA took special notice of the Sanctuary movement, which had formerly been a movement of progressive churches, inspired by the Liberation Theology movement. In less than a year, over twenty synagogues were active in the sanctuary movement. This was accomplished in part by distributing educational packets on the issues to over 2,000 rabbis and synagogues and by publishing articles and letters to the editor. NJA also distributed two brochures about the concerns that had kept progressive Jews from responding to Central American crisis and the scriptural commandments that obligate Jews to harbor the persecuted and protect them from harm.

In 1986, NJA sponsored national speaking tours by three rabbis whose congregations have offered sanctuary to Central American refugees. Agenda's "Jewish Witness for Peace" delegation created a 30-minute video called "Crossing Borders" which was distributed within the Jewish community as an educational tool.

== Post-Agenda ==
New Jewish Agenda was a leadership incubator which contributed to the formation of many more focused and single-issue organizations before it shut down in 1992. There is no conclusive agreement as to the reasons behind NJA's official disbanding, but it is thought to have been in large part due to long-term debt, at one point reaching $60,000 and possibly higher. NJA was also isolated because the mainstream Jewish community did not agree with its positions regarding Israel/Palestine and the status of Lesbian and Gay Jews. NJA helped with the development of other left wing Jewish organizations, including Americans for Peace Now, The New Israel Fund, Jewish Fund for Justice, The Shalom Center, The Shefa Fund, Bridges Journal, American Friends of Neve Shalom, Brit Tzedek v'Shalom, Bat Shalom, and The Abraham Fund. It also built liaisons with older organizations such as the Jewish Peace Fellowship.

== See also ==
- Jewish left
