= How We Get Free =

2017 book edited by Keeanga-Yamahtta Taylor

How We Get Free: Black Feminism and the Combahee River Collective is a 2017 book edited by Keeanga-Yamahtta Taylor about the principles involved with Combahee River Collective. It was published on the occasion of the Collective's 40th anniversary.

In addition to the Collective's original statement, the book includes interviews with sisters Barbara Smith, Beverly Smith, and Demita Frazier, who were the Collective's co-founders, as well as interviews with Alicia Garza and historian Barbara Ransby. The interviews showcase the Collective's continued impact on Black feminist issues, including the renewed focus on identity politics.

== Reception ==
Writing in Signs: Journal of Women in Culture & Society, Sarah J. Jackson notes that each of the women interviewed in the book prompts readers to remember that black, feminist politics are an "extension and application of socialist ideals, both economic and in relation to community and collectivity, that helped black women in the sixties and seventies imagine that a world in which feminist, antiracist, and queer values are simply lived is possible".

Kristal Moore Clemons writes in the Journal of African American History: "Taylor's work contributes to the expanding literature on black feminism as an analytical framework to activists' response to oppression and state-sanctioned violence."

== Awards ==
The book won the 2018 Lambda Literary Award for LGBTQ non-fiction.
