= Roxbury murders =

1979 murder series in Boston, Massachusetts, U.S.

The Roxbury murders also known as “The Stride Rite Murders” (because the first two victims were discovered dismembered in their plastic trash bags) occurred between January and May 1979 when eleven Black women and one White woman were murdered within several miles of one another in the Roxbury neighborhood on the south side of Boston, Massachusetts. This was not suspected to be the work of one serial killer, as at least four different men were charged on account of these murders. The Boston Globe was one of the only media outlets to cover the killings. Those most vocal about these incidents, however, were Black feminist groups, such as the Combahee River Collective, who drew connections between the violent deaths and the multiple systematically marginalized identities of the Black, female victims.

== Roxbury social climate ==
During the 1970s, the Boston area experienced severe racial tensions and a lethal social climate. The Roxbury neighborhood and surrounding neighborhoods, where the African-American victims were found, were in the midst of social movements that started with the desegregation of public schools. In 1974, this desegregation led to numerous events such as riots, protests, and violent actions that occurred on both sides and led to a number of hospitalizations and deaths. Initially, the neighborhoods surrounding Roxbury belonged to certain racial groups such as Irish-Americans, Italian-Americans, and African-Americans. After Judge Garrity ordered that the school and buses be desegregated, people from different backgrounds were forced to intermingle and co-habitat. With heightened tensions, there were numerous incidents of racial attacks. Examples include, but are not limited to, the stabbing of an African-American attorney, the public beating and death of a white male, a group of African-American high school students being trapped in the school for hours by an angry mob, and the brutal attack on an African-American football player.

== The victims ==
Christine (Chris) Ricketts, 15, was found on the sidewalk on East Lenox Street in Roxbury on January 29, 1979 with Andrea Foye.

Andrea Foye, 17, was found strangled on the sidewalk on East Lenox Street in Roxbury on January 29, 1979.

- Dennis Jamal Porter was arrested in connection with these two killings.
- Foye and Ricketts were the first two victims. Both were found in trash bags with a blanket.

Gwendolyn Yvette Stinson, 15, was found strangled in a yard near her Park Street home in Dorchester on Tuesday January, 30. Her neighbor, 40-year-old James Brown, was arrested for the murder.

Caren Prater, 25, was found dead on February 2 near Boston Parks Department office in Franklin Park. She was an unemployed mother of a two-year-old girl. The day of her death, she was heading to her 75-year-old grandfather Charles Prater's house, who she often took shopping. Prater was beaten and stabbed to death then left in a wooded area near a hospital. She was the fourth victim. Kenneth Spann was arrested in relation to her death.

Daryal Ann Hargett, 29, was found strangled and bound in her apartment in Wellington on Wednesday, February 21. She was a choir singer and social worker.

Desiree Denise Etheridge, 17, was found beaten and burned to death on Fellow Street in Dorchester on Wednesday, March 14. Her skull and jaw were shattered. She was a part-time student who lived on the same street as Stinson. Her body was found 100 yards away from a school where the bodies of Rickett and Foye were discovered.

Darlene Rogers, 22, was stabbed multiple times and found naked from the waist down in Washington Park on April 14.

Lois Hood Nesbitt, 31, was found tied up and strangled to death by a radio cord in her bed on April 28. Her murderer's name was Richard Strother, 31. Despite sharing the same address, it is unclear whether they lived in the same building together or as neighbors.

Valyric Holliday, 19, was conscious when police arrived to her apartment on a Friday night. She told police she was stabbed by 18-year-old Eugene B. Conway, who lived in the Dorchester residence with her. Conway was arrested that night and pleaded innocent. Valyric died Saturday morning.

Sandra Boulware, 30, was found dead with her body naked and burned in a grass lot near a YMCA at around 5 a.m. She was the 10th woman murdered. Her sister had reported her missing after three days. Her murderer was Osbourne (Jimmy) Sheppard, 55.

Bobbie Jean Graham, 34, was the 12th woman murdered. Graham's autopsy states that she died from a lacerated liver caused by multiple blows to her midsection with a blunt object. Multiple witnesses reported seeing a black couple walking towards the alley, with the woman appearing intoxicated and unsteady on her feet. The man yanked the woman up and dragged her into the alley. Graham was found in the alley the next morning.

Several of the women who appeared in the local newspapers had only a cursory description of their death.

== Responses to the attacks ==
=== Combahee River Collective ===
Black community leaders held that these murders were acts of racialized violence, but Barbara Smith along with the Combahee River Collective wanted it to be recognized as both racialized and sexualized acts of violence against Black women. Following the march/memorial that Spring, Smith and the Collective wrote and distributed pamphlets entitled “Six Black Women: Why Did they die?” The pamphlets were distributed to the women within the community. The pamphlet itself focused specifically on the murders which were not being covered extensively by the police or media. The collective held that these murders were both racist and sexist, because not only were the people who were murdered Black but they were also women and that they were killed because they were Black women who were systemically undervalued in American society. On April 1, 1979, thousands gathered for a march memorializing the deaths of, at that time, six women who were murdered in a 2-mile radius of each other. The protest was organized by Barbara Smith's Combahee River Collective group. During the march, Sarah Small, aunt of slain woman, Daryal Ann Hargett, asked the audience a question: “Who's killing us?” The simple, yet powerful, question struck the audience for no one knew why Black women were being killed randomly, why their deaths were not garnering national attention like their white counterparts, and who were the murderers. During the march, many Black men caused a stir when they failed to realize that there was a gender component to the murders and did not address the violence against Black women. In 2012, TV One hosted television show, “Find Our Missing,” dedicated to creating exposure for missing Black women and girls in the United States whose cases have not gained as much national media coverage as their white counterparts. In an episode featured in the series, Hargett's death was covered.

=== The Coalition for Women's Safety ===
The Coalition for Women's Safety, an organization of Bostonian women who worked to combat violence against women in response to the murders, established two courses of action. The first was to educate their community about the matter of violence against women, and the other was to examine licensing and regulations of taxi drivers, in response to a high number of assaults in taxicabs. Members of the Coalition also coordinated support groups for community members affected by the murders, workshops on firearm safety and self-defense for women, establishing a trust fund for families of the murdered women, educating workers in health services on assisting the needs of Latina victims of assault, and groups who traveled within the community to talk about issues of security.

=== Media coverage ===
Local newspapers reported on these murders as they happened, and even kept a count, but despite activist work on the ground, most of these murders failed to make national news. One exception being Faye Polner, a white victim. Her death was widely publicized, but not necessarily tied to the other murders, an example of “Missing White Woman Syndrome” in the surrounding media.
