= Demita Frazier =

American social justice activist

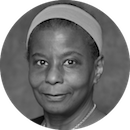
- Born: Chicago, Illinois
- Education: Northeastern University (JD)
- Occupations: Independent Scholar, Writer, Social Justice Activist
- Movement: Black Feminism

Demita Frazier is a Black Feminist, thought leader, writer, teacher, and social justice activist. She is a founding member of the Combahee River Collective (CRC). While it has been more than fifty years since the Combahee River Collective released their Black Feminist Statement, Frazier has remained committed to the "lifetime of work and struggle" for liberation for all.

== Early life and activism ==
As a child of the Fifties, Frazier attributes the events during the years of 1967-1969, including but not limited to the Civil Rights Movement, the Black Power Movement and the Women's Movement, as a "political awakening" for her. One text was particularly influential for Frazier, which was Woman Power: The Movement for Women's Liberation by Celestine Ware.

Frazier began her lifelong commitment to activism by opposing the Vietnam War in high school, where she helped organize a student walk out in protest to the war. After leaving traditional school settings to pursue her own independent studies, Frazier participated in political organizing and activism with the Chicago Black Panther's Breakfast Program and the Jane Collective. Frazier eventually moved to Boston and continued organizing there. In Boston, she connected with other founding members of the CRC, Barbara Smith and Beverly Smith, through the National Black Feminist Organization (NBFO). The CRC was an evolution of the NBFO. In January 1983, Frazier interviewed Diane Dujon about her advocacy surrounding issues that working women faced during that time. This interview was published in Sojourner: The Women's Forum. In addition to her organizing and activism, Frazier obtained her Juris Doctor from Northeastern University.

=== Combahee River Collective ===
The CRC solidified the foundation that broadened the Black feminism perspective with their founding in 1974. The group's name came from the heroic actions of Harriet Tubman, who solely led a campaign that freed more than 750 slaves at South Carolina's Combahee River in 1863. The overall mission of the CRC was to inform society of the lived experiences of African-American women. They released their "Combahee River Collective Statement in 1977. Their statement includes the first usage of identity politics and was an important contribution to the concept in critical race theory.

As a founding member of the Combahee River Collective, Frazier's intellectual labor is referenced every time the CRC name is uttered. One of the largest contributions of the CRC statement is the recognition of "intersecting oppressions" prior to the coining of the term intersectionality by Kimberlé Crenshaw. Which Frazier says in Keeanga-Yamahtta Taylor's (Ed.) book, How We Get Free that she noted in "probably our third or fourth draft of the statement, I said,...we stand at the intersection where our identities are indivisible."

The CRC and their statement defined Black Feminism then and their words and legacy continue to shape it presently. For Frazier, "Black Feminism is a representation of Black women's power. Black women's agency. Black women's right to look at their material conditions, analyze it, interrogate it, and come away with an analysis that's about empowerment."

References to the contributions and impact of the CRC can be found throughout the canon of Black Feminist Thought in works such as Words of Fire: An Anthology of African-American Feminist Thought edited by Beverly Guy-Sheftall and Mouths of Rain: An Anthology of Black Lesbian Thought edited by Briona Simone Jones.

The Combahee River Collective disbanded in 1980 and Frazier wrote the group's final statement, alongside Barbara Smith and Beverly Smith.

== Later life ==
Frazier has taught and lectured throughout the New England region, most recently at Bunker Hill Community College.

On the subject of intergenerational coalition, Frazier stated in a 2017 roundtable:

"...I dream of deep listening across the generations, both to what we find easy to say and to that with which we struggle mightily...Organizing for political change is hard work, particularly in coalition, and core issues--the ability to deeply listen, to tolerate ambiguity and paradox, to demonstrate respect in the ways that are most meaningful when working across and through difference---take a kind of discipline that takes leadership and time to develop."

In that same roundtable when asked of how she keeps going in the work of liberation, Frazier said:

"I am unwilling to give up this fight for freedom, for all people, especially Black people, and I am inspired by the many humans I share this planet with who are committed to that struggle. So many quietly brave, unwavering people have shared the struggle for freedom. I am allied with that energy."

Frazier continues to dismantle the myth of white supremacy, by working to end misogynoir, hetero-patriarchal hegemony, and undermining late stage capitalism. She has remained committed in her advocacy for black feminist social justice rights for more than 44 years. On March 7, 2019, Frazier lectured at the Harvard Graduate School of Design Gund Hall Piper Auditorium. This event was co-organized by Womxn in Design and the African American Student Union at the Harvard Graduate School of Design, and was titled "International Womxn's Week Keynote Address: Demita Frazier, 'Aesthetic Apartheid: Gender, Race, and Socio-economic Class, and the Impact on Perception, Engagement and Experience'". In this lecture, Frazier raised questions about the decision-making process in regard to architectural design in cities, and explored the impacts that it can have on minority communities. On February 3, 2023, Frazier spoke at Northeastern University Africana Studies Program's Annual bell hooks Symposium: "Black Feminism, Black Freedom". She discussed the importance of black feminism in the face of white supremacy, and the struggle for black women's voices to be heard during a time where black men's fight for equality took precedence. On Wednesday, May 22, 2024, Demita Frazier and Barbara Smith participated in an interview with Black Women Radicals in celebration of the 50th anniversary of the Combahee River Collective. She is a practicing unallied Buddhist, committed to embodied loving kindness. When she isn't working she enjoys working in her garden and cooking.
