= Beverly Smith =

American academic (born 1946)

- Born: November 16, 1946 (age 79); Cleveland, Ohio, U.S.
- Education: University of Chicago (BS); Yale University (MPH); Harvard University (MS)
- Relatives: Barbara Smith (sister)

Beverly Smith (born November 16, 1946) is a Black feminist health advocate, writer, academic, theorist and activist. She was born in Cleveland, Ohio, and is the twin sister of writer, publisher, activist and academic Barbara Smith. Beverly Smith is an instructor of Women's Health at the University of Massachusetts Boston.

She was one of three authors of the famous Combahee River Collective Statement, "one of the most widely read discussions of Black feminism", which was developed by members of the radical lesbian black feminist Combahee River Collective in 1977. Her essays and articles on racism, feminism, identity politics and women's health have been extensively published in the United States.

== Early life ==
Beverly Smith was born on November 16, 1946, in Cleveland, Ohio, to Hilda Beall Smith. Her father, Gartrell Smith was not present during her childhood. Both twins were born prematurely and Smith developed pneumonia. Smith first lived in a two-bedroom house with her sister, mother, grandmother, and great-aunt. At the age of six, the twins and their family moved into a two-family house with her aunt and her husband.

Smith was raised in a full home that included her mother, grandmother, her aunt, and periodically, her aunt's husband. Growing up, her mother worked as a supermarket clerk, and Smith's grandmother became the twins primary caretaker. On October 16, 1956, Hilda, her mother died after being hospitalized for several months as a result of heart complications that originated from childhood rheumatic fever. Education was highly valued by the women in her family. Smith's mother had a Bachelor's of Science in education from Fort Valley State University. While Hilda Beall Smith was the only family member to receive a university education, Smith's other family members worked as teachers.

=== Education ===
Beverly Smith attended Bolton Elementary School before transferring to Robert Fulton Elementary school, Alexander Hamilton Jr. High School and John Adams High School. Smith graduated high school in January 1965, and enrolled at the University of Chicago later that year, graduating in 1969 with a Bachelor of Arts in history.

She later went on to receive a Masters of Public Health from Yale University and a Masters of Human Development and Psychology from Harvard Graduate School of Education.

The death of Smith's mother motivated her to pursue public health in university, with a focus on Black women's health.

=== Early activism ===
Smith became politically active when she was in high school and was involved in Congress of Racial Equality (CORE). At the time of her involvement with CORE, de facto segregation was a big issue with the school systems and her early activism involved picketing the school board and school boycotts. On the day of one of the boycotts, Smith and her sister attended a boycott meeting at a nearby church and where they read the Riot Act. Smith was inspired by the feminist protests at the 1968 Miss American pageant. After graduating high school, Smith became more involved with CORE alongside her sister and the two of them participated in canvassing. In April 1964, Smith was part of a protest in honor of Civil Rights activist Bruce Klunder in Cleveland, Ohio after his untimely death. Smith met Fannie Lou Hamer at a party after a rally in Cleveland. Smith was also involved with the Southern Christian Leadership Conference in 1967.

While attending the University of Chicago, Smith formed a support group with other Black students where they would talk about racism on campus. In her third year, a friend of her sister Barbara who had transferred to the University of Chicago invited Smith to a women's liberation meeting, where she became involved in political movements once again. While at university, Beverly Smith attended the speeches of Stokely Carmichael and Martin Luther King Jr.

=== Religion ===
In her writings, Smith notes that religion and education "were twin pillars" in her home as she grew up. She was raised in the Baptist Church and attended Antioch Baptist Church, one of the oldest African-American churches in Cleveland. Smith is a member of the First Parish of Watertown, a Unitarian Universalist church since 2014.

== Career ==
In 1973, Smith moved to New York City and became a writer for Ms. magazine. Through networking at the National Black Feminist Organization (NBFO) conference in 1973, Smith met a woman who helped her land a job at the New York City Health and Hospitals Corporation doing research. During her master's program, Smith worked various placements in health centres in Boston. After receiving her master's degree in public health from Yale University in 1976, Smith worked at Boston City Hospital in women's health, focusing on contraceptive counselling. Smith has worked at Floating Hospital for Children.

== Activism ==
=== Feminism ===
While living in New York City, Smith became involved with organizations such as National Organization for Women (NOW) and National Black Feminist Organization (NBFO). She began attended NOW meetings in 1973 but soon stopped going as their focus was on white middle- and upper-class struggles. It was at the NBFO conference where Smith was able to relate to other Black women's experiences and called the conference "revelatory."

Smith credits her early career in women's health as influential to her feminist work. When working as a contraceptive counselor at Boston City Hospital, Beverly Smith was exposed to the state of women's healthcare and she then maintained a working relationship with a feminist health center in the area. Smith attended conferences speaking on Black and Third World women's health. She also worked with the Boston Committee on ending sterilization abuse. Smith was heavily involved in Black women's health advocacy, emphasizing the effect of racism and sexism on the Black woman's body. Much of her work focuses on reproductive health, diseases, mental health, Black women as health workers, sexuality, and violence against Black women and children.

On the subject of "the personal being political", Smith stated in a 1978 interview:

"I think one of the major contributions the feminist movement - of this part of the feminist movement is of the personal being political. What that boils down to is that any situation in which there is an issue about power and control is by definition a political situation. So, you can have a political situation in your own kitchen, in your own bedroom, or in your own gynecologists office. You don't have to be talking about the houses of Congress or the Supreme Court to be talking about politics. Politics are, in a sense, obscured and taken out of the realm of everyday life. But that's where everyone lives their lives."

Beverly Smith took part in the above interview as a member of the Boston Chapter Committee to End Sterilization Abuse. The interview was part of a segment regarding the impact of male physicians on women's healthcare and political issues surrounding women's healthcare and sex education.

=== Combahee River Collective ===
The early stages of Combahee River Collective began in 1975 while Smith was living in Boston for her work placements at Boston City Hospital with her sister, Barbara Smith, and Demita Frazier. The collective began as the Boston chapter of the NFBO, but in 1975 became independent as a result of different political goals. The collective revolved around nine core members: Barbara Smith and her twin sister, Beverly Smith, as well as Demita Frazier, Cheryl Clarke, Akasha Gloria Hull, Margo Okazawa-Rey, Chirlane McCray, and Audre Lorde.

Beverly Smith, Barbara Smith, and Demita Frazier began writing the statement after they were asked by Barbara's friend, Zillah Eisenstein. The statement was first published in Zillah's 1978 anthology called "Capitalist Patriarchy and the Case for Socialist Feminism." The three women had been involved enough with various women's movements to understand that those movements were not addressing racism. The intersections of race, sex, and class were critical to the collective when penning the statement. Smith attributes a portion of the development of Black feminism on the statement.

The politics of the collective were situated in anti-racism, classism, homophobia, and hetero-normativity. Smith and her group saw that Black feminism had the logic and rhetoric to combat the oppression of all women of color. The collective was also involved in advocating for abortion rights, and combating sterilization abuse and domestic violence. The CRC emphasized the importance of solidarity among Black women for liberation. The collective disbanded in 1980.

== Legacy ==
The Combahee River Collective Statement has had lasting impacts on Black Feminism and socialism. It coined terms such as interlocking oppression and Identity politics. CRC also gave Black and Brown women entry points into political involvement. The collective's legacy has been preserved in Keeanga-Yamahtta Taylor's book, "Black Feminism and the Combahee River Collective." The Combahee River Collective was recognized as a 2024 HistoryMaker by the History Project.

== Selected works ==
=== Periodicals ===
- Conditions Five, The Black Women's Issue, November 1979;
- Conditions Four, Smith, Barbara, and Beverly. I Am Not Meant to be Alone and Without You Who Understand: Letters From Black Feminists, 1972-1978, Winter 1978
- Sinister Wisdom - various issues
- Barbara Smith and Beverly Smith, "The Varied Voices of Black Women", Sojourner (magazine), October 1978.
- Ms. Magazine- various issues
- Aegis Journal, 1983, "Some Thoughts on Racism".

=== Anthologies ===
- Smith, Beverly. "The Wedding", in Home Girls: A Black Feminist Anthology, 1983, ed. Barbara Smith, Kitchen Table: Women of Color Press
- Combahee River Collective Statement, authored with Barbara Smith and Demita Frazier
- Smith, Barbara & Beverly. "Across the Kitchen Table: A Sister-to-Sister Dialogue", in This Bridge Called My Back: Writings by Radical Women of Color (eds), Cherríe Moraga and Gloria Anzaldúa, Persephone Press, 1981.
- Smith, Beverly. "Black Women's Health: Notes for a Course", in But Some of Us are Brave: Black Women's Studies, Hull, Gloria T., Scott, Patricia Bell, Smith, Barbara (eds), The Feminist Press, 1982. ISBN 0-912670-95-9
- Smith, Beverly. "Face-to-Face, Day-to-day — Racism Consciousness Raising", A conversation with Tia Cross, Freada Klein & Beverly Smith, in But Some of Us are Brave: Black Women's Studies, Hull, Gloria T., Scott, Patricia Bell, Smith, Barbara (eds), Feminist Press, 1982. ISBN 0-912670-95-9
- Smith, Beverly. "Choosing Ourselves: Black Women and Abortion", in From Abortion to Reproductive Freedom: Transforming a Movement, ed. Marlene Gerber Fried, South End Press, 1990, p. 86.
