= Keeanga-Yamahtta Taylor =

American academic and author

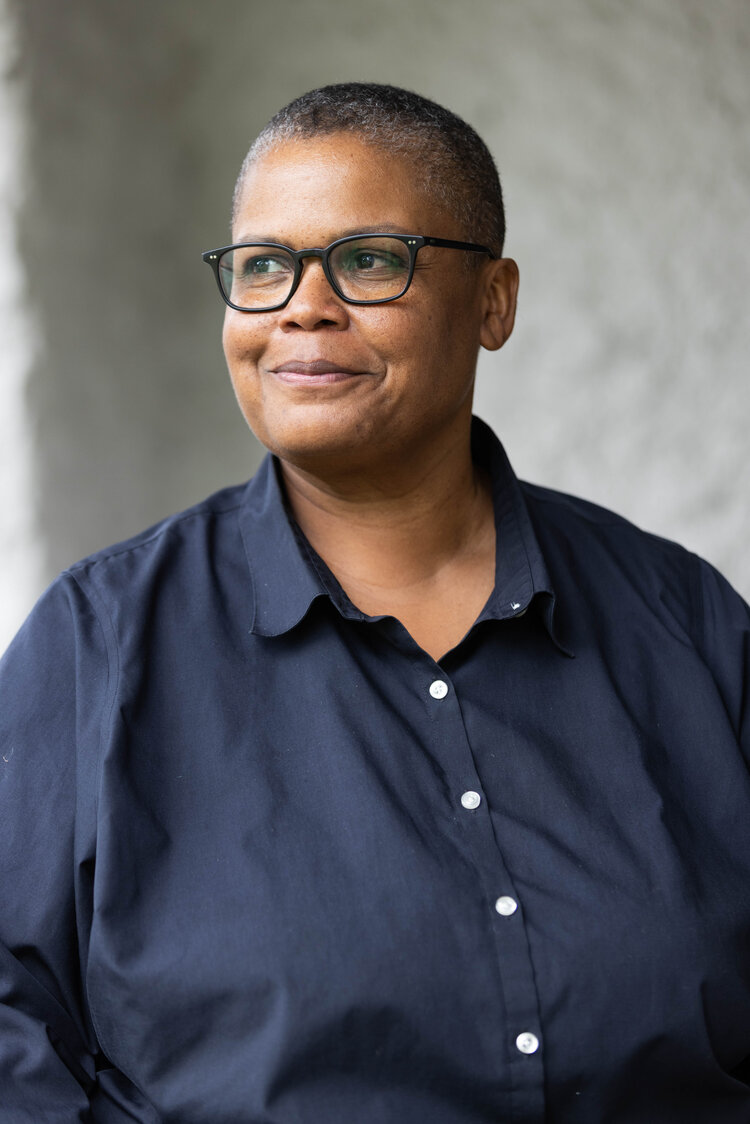
- Occupation: Professor
- Awards: MacArthur Fellow

Academic background
- Education: Northeastern Illinois University (BA); Northwestern University (MA, PhD)
- Thesis: Race for Profit: The Political Economy of Black Urban Housing in the 1970's (2013)

Academic work
- Discipline: African American Studies
- Institutions: Princeton University
- Notable works: From #BlackLivesMatter to Black Liberation (2016)

Keeanga-Yamahtta Taylor is an American academic, writer, and activist. She is a professor of African American Studies at Princeton University. She is the author of From #BlackLivesMatter to Black Liberation (2016). For this book, Taylor received the 2016 Cultural Freedom Award for an Especially Notable Book from the Lannan Foundation. She is a co-publisher of Hammer & Hope, an online magazine that began in 2023.

== Education ==
While working as a tenant advocate, Taylor enrolled in night classes at Northeastern Illinois University. She moved to New York City before returning to Chicago, Illinois to complete her Bachelor of Arts degree in 2007. Taylor then earned a M.A. (2011) and PhD (2013) in African American Studies from Northwestern University. Her dissertation is titled Race for Profit: Black Housing and the Urban Crisis in the 1970s.

== Career ==
From 2013 to 2014, Taylor held the Chancellor's Postdoctoral Fellowship in the Department of African American Studies at the University of Illinois at Champaign-Urbana. Taylor was a professor at Princeton University in the African American Studies Department. Opinion pieces authored by Taylor have appeared in The Guardian, The New York Times, The New Yorker, and Jacobin. Taylor has also appeared as a guest on Democracy Now!, NPR's All Things Considered, The Intercept podcast, and NBC's Why Is This Happening? with Chris Hayes among many other venues.

Taylor's book Race for Profit: Black Housing and the Urban Crisis in the 1970s was published in 2019 by the University of North Carolina Press. It was a 2020 semi-finalist for the National Book Award for nonfiction and a 2020 finalist for the Pulitzer Prize for History. She is a 2021 Guggenheim fellow.

On September 28, 2021, Taylor was named a MacArthur Fellow.

In 2022, she became professor of African-American studies at Northwestern University, her alma mater, in Evanston, IL. In July 2023, she returned to Princeton as professor.

== Activism ==
On January 20, 2017, Taylor participated in the Anti-Inauguration, organized by Jacobin, Haymarket Books, and Verso at the Lincoln Theatre on the same day as the Inauguration of Donald Trump. Other speakers included Naomi Klein, Anand Gopal, Jeremy Scahill, and Owen Jones.

In 2017, Taylor co-authored a call to mobilize a women's strike, which culminated in the Day Without a Woman on March 8, 2017. In articles for The Guardian and The Nation, Taylor defended the 2017 Women's March.

On May 20, 2017, Taylor gave a commencement speech at Hampshire College, in which she referred to President Donald Trump as a "racist, sexist, megalomaniac". After Fox News aired a clip from her speech, she received numerous intimidating and derogatory e-mails, including death threats resulting in Taylor canceling scheduled talks in Seattle and San Diego. In response, Jonathan Lash, the president of Hampshire College, released a statement on June 1, 2017, in support of Taylor and her speech saying that it aligned with the mission of Hampshire College.

On July 6, 2017, Taylor gave the speech at the Socialism 2017 conference led by the Trotskyist International Socialist Organization in Chicago.

Taylor was a long-time member of the International Socialist Organization and was selected to serve on the group's steering committee in 2013, but resigned in 2019 following internal revelations among the ISO membership that the 2013 steering committee had interfered with an internal investigation concluding a rape was committed by an ISO member, who was subsequently permitted to remain in the organization. Shortly after the revelations and Taylor's resignation, the organization voted to dissolve itself.

In March 2022, Taylor was among 151 international feminists signing Feminist Resistance Against War: A Manifesto, in solidarity with the Feminist Anti-War Resistance initiated by Russian feminists after the Russian invasion of Ukraine.

== Selected publications ==
- Taylor, Keeanga-Yamahtta (December 2006). "Racism and the Criminal Injustice System". International Socialist Review: 33–36.
- — (July 1, 2012). "Back story to the neoliberal moment: Race taxes and the political economy of black urban housing in the 1960s". Souls. 14 (3–4): 185–206. doi:10.1080/10999949.2012.764836. S2CID 142717481.
- — (February 23, 2016). From #BlackLivesMatter to Black Liberation. Haymarket Books. ISBN 9781608465620. OCLC 907653029.
- Taylor, Keeanga-Yamahtta, ed. (2017). How We Get Free: Black Feminism and the Combahee River Collective. Chicago: Haymarket. ISBN 9781608468553. OCLC 975027867.
- Hunter, Marcus Anthony; Pattillo, Mary; Robinson, Zandria F; Taylor, Keeanga-Yamahtta (March 27, 2016). "Black placemaking: Celebration, Play, and Poetry". Theory, Culture & Society. 33 (7–8): 31–56. doi:10.1177/0263276416635259. S2CID 147034131.

== Books ==
=== Race for Profit: The Political Economy of Black Urban Housing in the 1970s, 2013 ===
This book is derived from Taylor's dissertation from 2013 when she was at Northwestern University. Taylor extensively discusses the actions after the 1960 urban rebellion by the government to provide affordable housing for African Americans. The goal of the dissertation was to see if the private housing industry could successfully find a solution to the 1960 urban rebellion. Additionally, Taylor questioned the partnership of public and private sectors and argued that these two sectors had different goals that work in opposition to one another.

=== The Anti-Inauguration: Building Resistance in the Trump Era, 2016 ===
Edited by Anand Gopal, Keeanga-Yamahtta Taylor, Naomi Klein, and Owen Jones, this book brought together a collection of speeches from the 2017 Anti-Inauguration Event in Washington DC. The speeches examine the Trump administration and policies. The anthology discusses a resistance to the Trump presidency through existing movements by having these movements work in cooperation with one another. The book was published on January 30, 2016, by Haymarket Books.

=== From #BlackLivesMatter to Black Liberation, 2016 ===
From #BlackLivesMatter to Black Liberation was published on February 23, 2016, by Haymarket Books. It won the 2016 Cultural Freedom Award for an Especially Notable Book. This book analyzed the political aspects of the BlackLivesMatter movement, including the history of the connection between race and policing and how the movement is separated from black politics. Taylor examined the history and motivation for the #BlackLivesMatter movement and considered whether the United States was in a post-racial period. The book examined whether the movement can be applied beyond police brutality to wider spectrum of activism.

=== How We Get Free: Black Feminism and the Combahee River Collective, 2017 ===
This book is composed of writings from the founders of the Combahee River Collective, a group from the 1960s and '70s of black feminists. The writings highlight the Combahee River Collective's impact on today's black feminism. Taylor edited the writings and the book was published on November 20, 2017, by Haymarket Books. The introduction is an essay by Taylor regarding the legacy of the Combahee River Collective, which begins by framing her discussion in the 2016 presidential elections. Following the introduction is a republishing of the Combahee River Collective Statement.

=== Fifty Years Since MLK, 2018 ===
The authors include Brandon Terry, Barbara Ransby, Keeanga-Yamahtta Taylor, and Bernard E. Harcourt. Published on February 2, 2018, by MIT Press, this book discusses Martin Luther King Jr's activism and his impact on today's activism. The authors discussed MLK's work before he was assassinated and consider how history influences current activism.

=== Race for Profit: How Banks and the Real Estate Industry Undermined Black Home Ownership, 2019 ===
This book examines the roots of the falling homeownership rate for African Americans. The book was longlisted for the 2019 National Book Award.

== Professional affiliations ==
- Urban History Association
- American Historical Association
- American Sociological Association

== See also ==
- Naomi Murakawa
- Barbara Smith
- Demita Frazier
- Tressie McMillan Cottom
