= Gwyn Kirk =

British sociologist and anti-nuclear weapon campaigner

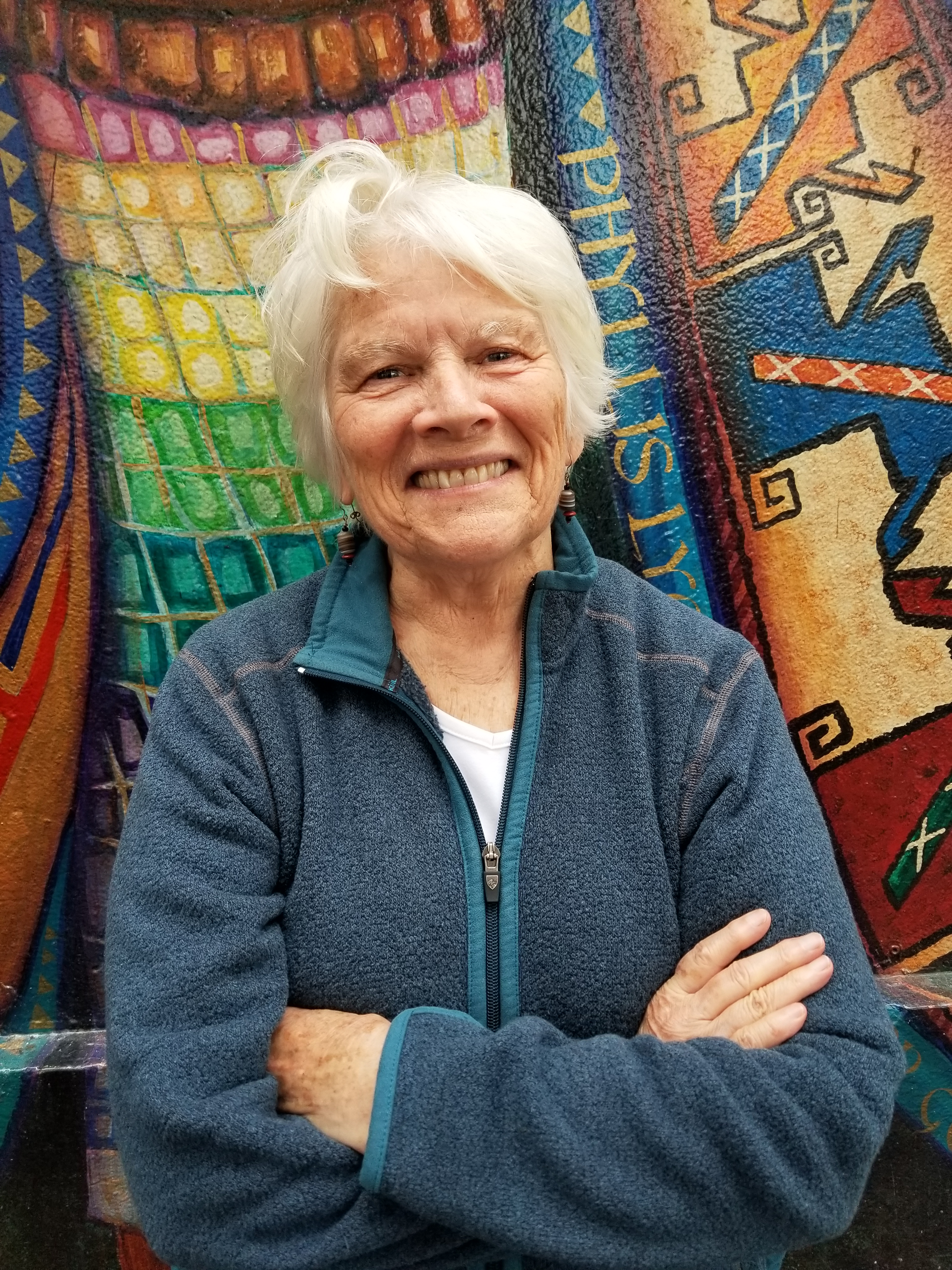
Kirk in 2019

Gwyn Kirk is a sociologist specialising in gender studies, ecofeminism and women's peace organisations and teaching at American colleges and universities. She is a peace activist having first been an active participant in the Greenham Common Women's Peace Camp, which opposed the siting of cruise missiles with nuclear warheads in Britain.

== Early life and education ==
Kirk grew up in Great Britain. She received a BA in sociology from the University of Leeds in 1967 and a diploma in town planning from what is now Leeds Beckett University. In 1980 she received a PhD in political sociology from the London School of Economics, with a thesis titled "Urban Planning in a Capitalist Society". She taught in the UK for five years and was an organiser and activist in community campaigns in Inner London, opposing gentrification. She spent time in Papua New Guinea, Malawi, Tanzania and Peru exploring issues of Third World women and development.

== Activism ==
In the 1980s, she was an active participant in the Greenham Common Women's Peace Camp. She filmed some of the actions and interviewed women living at the peace camp or involved in the wider network. She raised funds to support the feminist and peace movements, writing articles and giving lectures in the UK and the US. She is a founding member of Women for Genuine Security and the International Women's Network Against Militarism. She is a founder member of the East Asia-US-Puerto Rico Women's Network Against Militarism.

In 1982, Kirk moved to the United States at the time when 14 Greenham women, including her, filed a lawsuit against the US Government in a federal court in New York. The suit, eventually unsuccessful because it was deemed to be "political", sought an injunction to stop cruise missiles being sent to England, arguing that deployment of the missiles violated international law forbidding the aggressive use of weapons that did not distinguish between civilians and military personnel, and denied US constitutional rights to life and liberty.

== Career ==
Kirk divides her time between teaching, research, publishing, and advocacy. She has taught courses on gender and sociology at universities and colleges such as Antioch College, where she chaired the Women's Studies Program (1992–1995), Colorado College, Hamilton College, Mills College at Northeastern University, Rutgers University, the University of Oregon, Pitzer College, Sonoma State University, and the University of San Francisco. She received a Rockefeller Fellowship at the University of Hawaii (2002). Her research has included study of the impact of military operations on the environment

== Publications and documentaries ==
In 1983, she and Alice Cook published Greenham Women Everywhere: Dreams, Ideas and Actions from the Women's Peace Movement, with the aim of demonstrating the validity of the movement and convincing other women to join the camp. Our Greenham Common: Feminism and Nonviolence was published in 1994.

With Margo Okazawa-Rey, she has been publishing Women's Lives: Multicultural Perspectives and Gendered Lives: Intersectional Perspectives since the 1990s. These are reference textbooks for gender studies, which the authors update regularly.

In 2011, she and Lina Hoshino directed Living Along the Fenceline. This documentary profiles Alma Bulawan from the Philippines; Diana Lopez from San Antonio, Texas; Lisa Natividad from Guam; Sumi Park from South Korea; Terri Keko'olani Raymond from Hawaii; and Yumi Tomita and Zaida Torres from Puerto Rico. These seven women oppose the American military presence in their countries.

She republished Urban Planning in a Capitalist Society in 2018.

Des femmes contre des missiles; rêves, idées et actions à Greenham Common, a translation into French of her work with Cook, was published in 2016.

Kirk has written many academic journal articles. She also writes for magazines and community papers in an effort to make her ideas more accessible.
