= Lorraine Bethel =

African-American lesbian feminist poet and author

Lorraine Bethel is an African-American lesbian feminist poet and author.

== Professional experience ==
Bethel is a graduate of Yale University. She has taught and lectured on black women's literature and black female culture at various institutions. She currently works as a freelance journalist in New York City.

== Involvement with the Combahee River Collective ==
Bethel participated in the Combahee River Collective, an organization that was part of the Women's Liberation Movement in the 1960s and 1970s. The collective was a black feminist group founded in Boston in 1974. It fought against racial, sexual, heterosexual, racial stereotypes and class oppression. As part of her involvement with the Collective, Bethel participated in seminars in colleges to share the Collective's position. Bethel, along with Barbara Smith, spoke to students at Ithaca College on February 23, 1979. Bethel and Smith spoke about black women not "fighting just one fight" as they deal with racism within the feminist movement and "heterosexual dominance" of black men in their fight against racism.

== Feminist writing ==
In an issue of off our backs, a feminist news journal, a participant recounts her experience in the 3rd World Lesbian Writers Conference on February 24, 1979 at New York City's Women's Center, in which Lorraine Bethel and Barbara Smith moderated one of the five workshops available. In their workshop, called "Third World Feminist Criticism", Bethel and Smith discussed various topics such as the definition of "criticism", criticism as a "creative" art, white feminism versus black feminism, intersectional feminism, and the unification of black lesbians.

Later that year, in November 1979, Bethel and Smith guest-edited "The Black Women's Issue" of Conditions: Five, a literary magazine primarily for black lesbian women. In the introduction, it is stated that the issue "disproves the 'non-existence' of Black feminist and Black lesbian writers and challenges forever our invisibility, particularly in the feminist press." Bethel wrote the poem "What Chou Mean We, White Girl? Or, The Cullud Lesbian Feminist Declaration of Independence", which was published in this issue.

Bethel's essay, ""The Infinity of Conscious Pain": Zora Neale Hurston and the Black Female Literary Tradition", appeared in the seminal book All of the Women Are White, All of the Blacks Are Men, But Some of Us Are Brave: Black Women's Studies. Identifying in this essay as a Black feminist critic, she wrote, "...I believe there is a separate and identifiable tradition of Black women writers, simultaneously existing within and independent of the America, Afro-American, and American female literary traditions."

== List of publications ==
- Bethel, Lorraine & Barbara Smith (eds.) Conditions (magazine): Five 2, no. 2: The Black Women's Issue (Autumn 1979)
- "What Chou Mean 'We', White Girl? Or, the Cullud Lesbian Feminist Declaration of Independence (Dedicated to the Proposition that All Women Are Not Equal, i.e., Identical/ly Oppressed)", poem published in Bethel & Smith (eds, 1979), pp. 86–92.
- "'This infinity of conscious pain': Zora Neale Hurston and the Black Female Literary Tradition". In Hull, Gloria T., Smith, Barbara and Scott, Patricia Bell (eds.), But Some of Us Are Brave: All the Women Are White, All the Blacks Are Men: Black Women's Studies. Feminist Press, 1986. ISBN 0-912670-95-9

== Additional reading ==
- ISIS. "Herstory in the Making." Off Our Backs Apr 30 1979: 20. ProQuest. Web. 22 May 2016.
- McDowell, Deborah E. Black American Literature Forum 16.2 (1982): 77–79. Web.
- Philyaw, Deesha. "Conditions: Five." Bitch Media, 5 May 2009. Web. 21 May 2016.
