= Jean Grossholtz =

American academic (1929–2021)

Thelma Jean Grossholtz (April 17, 1929 – February 9, 2021) was an American professor of politics and women's studies at Mount Holyoke College in South Hadley, Massachusetts. Beyond her academic work she was also known as an activist for peace and against forced prostitution, and as a senior bodybuilder.

== Academic career ==
After completing undergraduate work at Pennsylvania State University in 1956, Grossholtz earned a master's degree at the University of Denver in 1957, with a master's thesis on Germany–Spain relations in World War II. Grossholtz went on to earn a Doctor of Philosophy from the Massachusetts Institute of Technology in 1961, where she trained as a specialist in South East Asian Politics. At Mount Holyoke, she became a founder of the women's studies program. She retired in 1999.

== Other activities ==
Grossholtz was arrested as an anti-war protester over dates ranging from 1941 to 2014. She was one of several pacifists from the Pioneer Valley profiled in the 2005 documentary film The Peace Patriots.

Although she was unathletic until her 50s, when she was 65 she won a silver medal in bodybuilding in the 1994 Gay Games . Grossholtz died February 9, 2021.

== Selected publications ==
Grossholtz's publications include:

- Grossholtz, Jean (1964), Politics in the Philippines: A Country Study, Boston, Massachusetts: Little Brown
- Bourque, Susan C.; Grossholtz, Jean (June 1974), "Politics an unnatural practice: Political science looks at female participation", Politics & Society, 4 (2): 225–266, doi:10.1177/003232927400400205, S2CID 143813325
- Grossholtz, Jean (1984), Forging Capitalist Patriarchy: The Economic and Social Transformation of Feudal Sri Lanka and Its Impact on Women, Durham, North Carolina: Duke University Press
