= Combahee River Collective =

Black feminist lesbian organization

- Abbreviation: CRC
- Formation: 1974; 52 years ago
- Dissolved: 1980; 46 years ago
- Headquarters: Boston, Massachusetts

The Combahee River Collective (CRC) (/kəmˈbiː/ kəm-BEE) was a Black feminist lesbian socialist organization active in Boston, Massachusetts, from 1974 to 1980. The Collective argued that both the white feminist movement and the civil rights movement were not addressing their particular needs as Black women and more specifically as Black lesbians. Racism was present in the mainstream feminist movement, while Delaney and Manditch-Prottas argue that much of the civil rights movement was sexist and homophobic. The Collective was a group that met to discuss the intersections of oppression based on race, gender, heteronormativity, and class and argued for the liberation of Black women on all fronts.

The Collective is perhaps best known for developing the Combahee River Collective Statement, a key document in the history of contemporary Black feminism and the development of the concepts of identity politics as used among political organizers and social theorists, and for introducing the concept of interlocking systems of oppression, including but not limited to gender, race, and sexuality, a fundamental concept of intersectionality. Gerald Izenberg credits the 1977 Combahee statement with the first usage of the phrase "identity politics". Through writing its statement, the CRC connected themselves to the activist tradition of Black women in the 19th century and to the struggles of Black liberation in the 1960s. The document embarked upon the separation of a gender-only focused feminism and highlighted the significance of interlocking systems of oppression.

== National Black Feminist Organization ==
Author Barbara Smith and other delegates attending the first (1973) regional meeting of the National Black Feminist Organization (NBFO) in New York City provided the groundwork for the Combahee River Collective with its efforts to build an NBFO Chapter in Boston. The NBFO was formed by Black feminists, Florynce Kennedy, Margaret Sloan-Hunter, and others, reacting to the failure of mainstream White feminist groups to respond to the racism that Black women faced in the United States. The organization sought to challenge the exclusion of Black women from mainstream feminist discourse and activism, which often prioritized the concerns and experiences of white women. It aimed to create a space where Black women's voices, perspectives, and issues could be centered and addressed. Members of the collective began the groundwork for the organization, believing that they were in need of more radical views in order to better address issues.

In her 2001 essay "From the Kennedy Commission to the Combahee Collective", historian and African American Studies professor Duchess Harris states that, in 1974 the Boston collective "observed that their vision for social change was more radical than the NBFO", and as a result, the group chose to strike out on its own as the Combahee River Collective. Members of the CRC, notably Barbara Smith and Demita Frazier, felt it was critical that the organization address the needs of Black lesbians, in addition to organizing on behalf of Black feminists.

== Naming ==
The Collective's name was suggested by Smith, who owned a book called Harriet Tubman, Conductor on the Underground Railroad by Earl Conrad. She "wanted to name the collective after a historical event that was meaningful to African American women." Smith noted: "It was a way of talking about ourselves being on a continuum of Black struggle, of Black women's struggle." The name commemorated a military operation at the Combahee River planned and led by Harriet Tubman on June 2, 1863, in the Port Royal region of South Carolina. The action freed more than 750 slaves, and it is the only military campaign in American history planned and led by a woman.

== Combahee River Collective Statement ==
=== Development ===
The Combahee River Collective Statement was developed by a "collective of Black feminists...involved in the process of defining and clarifying our politics, while...doing political work within our own group and in coalition with other progressive organizations and movements..."

Members of the collective describe having a feeling of creating something which had not existed previously. Demita Frazier described the CRC's beginnings as "not a mix cake", meaning that the women involved had to create the meaning and purpose of the group "from scratch." In her 1995 essay "Doing it from Scratch: The Challenge of Black Lesbian Organizing", which borrows its title from Frazier's statement, Barbara Smith describes the early activities of the collective as "consciousness raising and political work on a multitude of issues", along with the building of "friendship networks, community and a rich Black women's culture where none had existed before."

The CRC sought to address the failures of organizations like the NBFO and build a collective statement to enable the analysis of capitalism's oppression of Black women, coming to the conclusion for a revolutionary society to meet the needs for those significantly oppressed; and by doing this it would liberate everyone. This was not an academic exercise, rather the CRC sought to create a mechanism for Black women to engage in politics. The catalyst for this engagement were the failures of organizations like the NBFO to successfully address the oppression Black women faced on issues like sterilization, sexual assault, labor rights, and workplace rights. This alienation as well as the domination of the Black liberation movement by Black men, led members of the CRC to reimagine a politics that engaged these issues.

=== Drafting ===
Throughout the mid-1970s members of the Combahee River Collective met weekly at the Women's Center in Cambridge, Massachusetts.

The Collective held retreats throughout the Northeast between 1977 and 1979 to discuss issues of concern to Black feminists. Author Alexis De Veaux, biographer of poet Audre Lorde, describes a goal of the retreats as to "institutionalize Black feminism" and develop "an ideological separation from white feminism", as well as to discuss "the limitations of white feminists' fixation 'on the primacy of gender as an oppression.'"

The first "Black feminist retreat" was held in July 1977 in South Hadley, Massachusetts, at the home of Jean Grossholtz, a lesbian feminist activist and professor of politics at Mount Holyoke with whom Barbara Smith had remained close. Its purpose was to assess the state of the movement, to share information about the participants' political work, and to talk about possibilities and issues for organizing Black women." "Twenty Black feminists...were invited (and) were asked to bring copies of any written materials relevant to Black feminism—articles, pamphlets, papers, their own creative work – to share with the group. Frazier, Smith, and Smith, who organized the retreats, hoped that they would foster political stimulation and spiritual rejuvenation."

The second retreat was held in November 1977 in Franklin Township, New Jersey, and the third and fourth were scheduled for March and July 1978. "After these retreats occurred, the participants were encouraged to write articles for the Third World women's issue of Conditions, a journal edited by Lorraine Bethel and Barbara Smith." The importance of publishing was also emphasized in the fifth retreat, held July 1979, and the collective discussed contributing articles for a lesbian herstory issue of two journals, Heresies, and Frontiers.

"Participants at the sixth retreat...discussed articles in the May/June 1979 issue of The Black Scholar collectively titled The Black Sexism Debate...They also discussed the importance of writing to Essence to support an article in the September 1979 issue titled I Am a Lesbian by Chirlane McCray, who was a Combahee member...The seventh retreat was held in Washington, D.C., in Feb. 1980."

The final statement was based on this collective discussion, and drafted by African-American activists Barbara Smith, Demita Frazier and Beverly Smith.

=== Content ===
The Combahee River Collective Statement was separated into four chapters: The Genesis of Contemporary Black Feminism; What We Believe; Problems in Organizing Black Feminists; and Black Feminist Issues and Projects.

==== Genesis of Contemporary Black Feminism ====
This chapter of the CRC statement traces the origin and trajectory of Black feminism. It situates the CRC within the larger Black feminist movement. The CRC presented itself as rooted in the historical activism of Sojourner Truth, Harriet Tubman, Frances E. W. Harper, Ida B. Wells Barnett, and Mary Church Terrell, as well as many unknown activists "who have a shared awareness of how their sexual identity combined with their racial identity to make their whole life situation and the focus of their political struggles unique." The CRC framed contemporary Black feminism as a genesis built upon the work of these activists. The Black feminist presence in the larger second wave American feminist movement resulted in the formation of separate Black feminist groups such as the National Black Feminist Organization as the needs of Black feminists were not met by mainstream organizations. The CRC also stated that it was the involvement of Black feminists in the Black Liberation movement of the 1960s and 1970s which impacted CRC members' ideologies and led to disillusionment with those movements. It mentions how this genesis is inherently a personal one for black women, tying into childhood experiences where one realizes the harsh reality of both racism and sexism. This keeps black women into looking deeper into their experiences and political analysis feminism uses in order to dismantle the system that oppresses them. It also addresses the development that occurred as a result of World War II, allowing its following generation financial and educational access not granted previously; through the use of tools tokenism has granted them to effectively fight the oppressor.

This chapter also introduced the CRC's belief that the oppression that Black women endured was rooted in interlocking oppressions. As Black women, the Collective argued that they experience oppression based on race, gender, and class. Further, because many of the women were lesbians, they also acknowledged oppression based on sexuality as well. The Collective states its basis and active goals as "committed to struggling against racial, sexual, heterosexual and class oppression" and describes its particular task as the "development of integrated analysis and practice based upon the fact that the major systems of oppression are interlocking. The synthesis of these oppressions creates the conditions of our lives."

==== What We Believe ====
This chapter of the CRC statement details what is identity politics and how it functions. The CRC's meaning of the term is that Black women had a right to formulate their own agenda based on the material conditions they faced as a result of race, class, gender, and sexuality.

We realize that the only people who care enough about us to work consistently for our liberation are us. Our politics evolve from a healthy love for ourselves, our sisters and our community which allows us to continue our struggle and work.

This chapter also details the CRC's belief that the destruction of capitalism, imperialism, and patriarchy is necessary for the liberation of oppressed peoples. The CRC identified as socialists and believed that work must be organized for the collective benefit of all people, not for the benefit of profit. To this end, the CRC was in agreement with Marx's theory as it was applied to the material economic relationships he analyzed. The CRC did not advocate for lesbian separatism as they felt it left out others who were valuable to the movement.

They explain that black women and their interests have been disregarded from the contemporaneous feminist movement that was mainly organized by and concerned with the struggles of white women (especially those of a middle or upper class background). Likewise, women were also often left out of the mostly male-led civil rights movement.

The Combahee River Collective notes that Black women are often looked down upon and that many individuals have a misconception that Black women simply want greater power. However, Black women, regardless of status or ethnicity, simply want to be included and treated properly. Black feminists all shared the idea that all Black women are intrinsically important, that their independence is necessary, and that they must share equal value and recognition with others. Ultimately, the entire purpose of the important anti-discrimination movement is inclusion rather than differentiation or exclusion, and it is the only way through which Black women can effectively tackle oppression and destroy it from its core. It is an extremely difficult journey for Black women, but their desires are relatively simple, namely to be accepted and included. Black women don't want any special rights, they only want to be accepted and acknowledged at the same level as all other humans and citizens of society.

==== Problems in Organizing Black Feminists ====
This chapter traces the problems and failures of organizing around Black feminism. The CRC believed that the fact that they were fighting to end multiple forms of oppression simultaneously, rather than just one form of oppression, was a major source of difficulty. The CRC also believed that because of its position as Black lesbian women, its members could not rely on having access to racial, sexual, heterosexual, or class privileges.

The CRC also believed that they experienced the psychological toll of its fight differently because of the "low value placed upon Black women's psyches in this society." In this view, the members of the CRC saw themselves as being at the bottom of the social hierarchy. Members of the organization suggests that the existence of being a black women in this world, they were already damaged people. They looked into Michele Wallace's "A Black Feminist's Search for Sisterhood," addressing classic isolation Black feminists face.

Because of this positioning, the CRC wrote that, "if Black women were free, it would mean that everyone else would have to be free since our freedom would necessitate the destruction of all the systems of oppression." Its belief in this statement also relies on its previous contention that the liberation of all peoples will be delivered with the destruction of capitalism, imperialism, and patriarchy.

The CRC's focus on the liberation of Black women also led to negative reactions by Black men. The CRC believed that because of this focus, Black men felt that "they might also be forced to change their habitually sexist ways of interacting with and oppressing Black women."

The chapter concludes by discussing some of the problems encountered within the group itself; not having a strategy for organizing or focusing. It notes that the group experienced a period of inactivity and disaccord due to a “lesbian-straight split” as well as differences in class and politics. After many members decided to stop attending, the group shifted focus and became a study group, with one of their primary goals being to gather a collection of Black feminist works.

==== Black Feminist Projects and Issues ====
The final chapter of the CRC statement affirms that the CRC was committed to improving the lives of all women, third world, and working people. The CRC stated, "We are of course particularly committed to working on those struggles in which race, sex, and class are simultaneous factors in oppression." The chapter details how this may apply in many ways around the world. Its members have worked on many projects dealing with abortion rights, abuse of sterilization, health care, physical and sexual violence against women.

This chapter also details how the CRC had started to publicly address the racism inherent in the white women's movement. The CRC believed that white women involved in the feminist movement had made little effort to combat or understand their own racism. Moreover, the CRC believed that these women must have "a more than superficial comprehension of race, color, and Black history and culture. While the CRC acknowledged that this work was the responsibility of white women, they would work by demanding accountability of these white women toward this end.

In this final chapter it includes that they do not support stepping others to achieve progress, as this would go against their vision and create a process as a nonhierarchical collective towards their revolutionary society. They believe to ensure this one must practice being self critical and continuously examining politics as they develop.

=== Impact ===
The Combahee River Collective Statement is referred to as "among the most compelling documents produced by Black feminists", and Harriet Sigerman, author of The Columbia Documentary History of American Women Since 1941, calls the solutions which the statement proposes to societal problems such as racial and sexual discrimination, homophobia and classist politics "multifaceted and interconnected."

In their Encyclopedia of Government and Politics, M. E. Hawkesworth and Maurice Kogan refer to the CRCS as "what is often seen as the definitive statement regarding the importance of identity politics, particularly for people whose identity is marked by multiple interlocking oppressions".

Smith and the CRC have been credited with coining the term identity politics, which they defined as "a politics that grew out of our objective material experiences as Black women." In her essay "From the Kennedy Commission to the Combahee Collective: Black Feminist Organizing, 1960–1980", Duchess Harris credits the "polyvocal political expressions of the Black feminists in the Combahee River Collective (with) defin(ing) the nature of identity politics in the 1980s and 1990s, and challeng(ing) earlier 'essentialist' appeals and doctrines..."

The Collective developed a multidimensional analysis recognizing a "simultaneity of oppressions", refusing to rank oppressions based on race, class and gender. According to author and academic Angela Davis, this analysis drew on earlier Black Marxist and Black Nationalist movements, and was anti-racist and anti-capitalist in nature.

In Roderick Ferguson's book Aberrations in Black, the Combahee River Collective Statement is cited as "rearticulating coalition to address gender, racial, and sexual dominance as part of capitalist expansion globally". Ferguson uses the articulation of simultaneity of oppressions to describe coalition building that exists outside the organizations of the nation-state.

==== Interlocking systems of oppression ====
The Combahee River Collective argued that various oppressions such as racism, sexism, heteronormativity, and classism are interrelated and must be addressed as a whole. They also believed that Black feminism was the logical political movement to fight against these simultaneous oppressions. According to them, as Black lesbians, their oppression could not be singularly categorized into racism, sexism or homophobia. The Combahee River Collective mentions that "We also often find it difficult to separate race from class from sex oppression because in our lives they are most often experienced simultaneously". The CRC Statement argues that one problem in organizing Black feminists is that they fight against a range of forms of oppression, unlike white feminism and the broader civil rights movement, each of which fight against one form of oppression.

== Other political work ==
In the encyclopedia Lesbian Histories and Cultures, contributing editor Jaime M. Grant contextualizes the CRC's work in the political trends of the time.

The collective came together at a time when many of its members were struggling to define a liberating feminist practice alongside the ascendence of a predominantly white feminist movement, and a Black nationalist vision of women deferring to Black male leadership.

Grant believes the CRC was most important in the "emergence of coalition politics in the late 1970s and early 1980s...which demonstrated the key roles that progressive feminists of color can play" in bridging gaps "between diverse constituencies, while also creating new possibilities for change within deeply divided communities..." She notes that, in addition to penning the statement, "collective members were active in the struggle for desegregation of the Boston public schools, in community campaigns against police brutality in Black neighborhoods and on picket lines demanding construction jobs for Black workers."

The collective was also politically active around issues of violence against women, in particular the murder of twelve Black women and one white woman in Boston in 1979. According to Becky Thompson, associate professor at Simmons University in Boston and author of A Promise and a Way of Life: White Antiracist Activism, the Boston Police Department and the media "attempted to dismiss the murders...based on the notion that (the women) were alleged to be prostitutes and therefore not worthy of protection or investigation."

In a 1979 journal entry, Barbara Smith wrote:

That winter and spring were a time of great demoralization, anger, sadness and fear for many Black women in Boston, including myself. It was also for me a time of some of the most intensive and meaningful political organizing I have ever done. The Black feminist political analysis and practice the Combahee River Collective had developed since 1974 enabled us to grasp both the sexual-political and racial-political implications of the murders and positioned us to be the link between the various communities that were outraged: Black people, especially Black women; other women of color; and white feminists, many of whom were also lesbians.

Smith developed these ideas into a pamphlet on the topic, articulating the need "to look at these murders as both racist and sexist crimes" and emphasizing the need to "talk about violence against women in the Black community." The pamphlet was initially titled “6 Black Women Why Did They Die”, however, the number of Black women who were murdered continued to rise. The number 6 was crossed out and replaced with 7, and eventually replaced with 8, illustrating the urgency of the crisis.

In a 1994 interview with Susan Goodwillie, Smith noted that this action moved the group out into the wider Boston community. She commented that "the pamphlet had the statement, the analysis, the political analysis, and it said that it had been prepared by the Combahee River Collective. That was a big risk for us, a big leap to identify ourselves in something that we knew was going to be widely distributed."

Historian Duchess Harris believes that "the Collective was most cohesive and active when the murders in Boston were occurring. Having an event to respond to and to collectively organize around gave them a cause to focus on..."

=== Importance of Black women's liberation ===
The CRC emphasized a fundamental and shared belief that "Black women are inherently valuable, that...(their) liberation is a necessity not as an adjunct to somebody else's but because of (their own) need as human persons for autonomy..." and expressed a particular commitment to "working on those struggles in which race, sex, and class are simultaneous factors in oppression..." The CRC sought to "build a politics that will change our lives and inevitably end our oppression."

Black women's liberation seeks to dismantle these intersecting systems of oppression and create a more equitable society; seeking to empower Black women to reclaim their agency and assert their rights, autonomy, and self-determination. It envisions broader social transformation that benefits not only Black women but also their communities and society as a whole and challenge societal expectations, stereotypes, and constraints that limit Black women's choices, opportunities, and overall well-being.

=== Importance of Black feminism ===
Black feminism is a feminist movement that focuses on Black women and their rights.

The Black feminist movement addresses Black women's unique experience of discrimination and oppression. Often, the feminist movement focuses on white, upper-class women and does not include other races, ethnicities, sexualities, economic classes, and other axes of oppression. The Black feminist movement gives Black women support and a group that fights for them directly.

The Black feminist movement emphasized the importance of Black women defining and representing themselves, challenging dominant narratives and stereotypes. It called for autonomy in shaping their own agendas and strategies for activism.

Black feminism centered the experiences and perspectives of Black women, it emphasized the need to analyze oppression through an intersectional lens and to prioritize the liberation of all marginalized groups; the significance of identity and shared experiences in building solidarity among marginalized groups. It advocated for alliances between various oppressed communities to challenge systems of power and work towards collective liberation.

== End ==
The Collective held its last network retreat in February 1980 and disbanded some time later that year. Several factors contributed into their decision, ranging from internal disagreements to challenges faced by the collective.

The collective consisted of diverse voices and perspectives, and over time, disagreements arose regarding political strategies, priorities, and ideologies. These differences made it difficult for the collective to maintain a cohesive and unified front. Like many grassroots organizations, the Combahee River Collective faced financial and resource limitations.

== Collective members and participants ==
The Combahee Collective was large and fluid throughout its history. Collective members and contributors include:

- Cheryl Clarke
- Demita Frazier
- Gloria Akasha Hull
- Audre Lorde
- Chirlane McCray
- Margo Okazawa-Rey
- Barbara Smith
- Beverly Smith
- Helen L. Stewart

== See also ==
- Kitchen Table: Women of Color Press
- African-American literature
- Critical social theory
- Identity politics
- Intersectionality
- Lesbian feminism
- Black Lesbian Literature
- Strategic essentialism
- Womanism
