= Doris Davenport (poet) =

American poet, teacher

- Born: January 29, 1949 (age 77); Gainesville, Georgia, U.S. Death: December 2, 2024, Gainesville, GA
- Education: Paine College (BA); University at Buffalo (MA); University of Southern California (PhD)
- Occupations: Writer, educator, poet

Doris Davenport, sometimes styled as doris davenport (January 29, 1949 – December 2, 2024), was an American writer, educator, and literary and performance poet. She wrote an essay featured in This Bridge Called My Back: Writings by Radical Women of Color entitled "The Pathology of Racism: A Conversation with Third World Wimmin." She also focuses her efforts on poetry and education.

Davenport identifies as African American, Appalachian, Feminist, and LGBTQ, which all heavily influence her writings. Today, she holds many workshops and poetry performances.

== Early life and education ==
Davenport was born in Gainesville, Georgia, and raised in Cornelia, Georgia. She often mentions her life growing up in the Appalachian foothills and has written many poems published in the Appalachian Heritage. She holds a Bachelor of Arts (BA) in English from Paine College. She earned a Master of Arts (MA) in English from the University at Buffalo. Her Doctorate of Philosophy (PhD) in Literature was obtained from the University of Southern California.

== Themes in Writing ==
=== Feminism ===
In a 40-year-old essay, "The Pathology of Racism: A Conversation with Third World Wimmin," she speaks of racism as a disease (which negatively affects white feminists). Davenport projects a vision of wellness among all feminists, worldwide, and states that there are many other issues to concentrate on. In more recent essays, davenport focuses on the poetry of African American wimmin, most recently, Brenda Marie Osbey of New Orleans, LA.

=== Sexual Identities ===
One of her influences as a writer is through her multiple identities. For instance, as a self-identified lesbian, Davenport incorporates poetry from her life that revolves around her prioritizing women. Her self-published collection of poems it's like this is her first published book of poetry, immersed in a spiritual-lesbian worldview.

=== Culture ===
davenport speaks often of her heritage and in many of her works, she expresses the joy and richness that comes along with being African American. Her themes follow her communities, the effects of modern feminism on her community, and the personal successes she's faced through her lifetime. Growing up in the south, davenport heavily incorporates her upbringing to reflect her childhood. Many of her works express her life living in the Appalachian Foothills as she has close ties to the area.

== Career ==
Today, davenport defines herself (pronouns: person, per) as an Independent Poet-Scholar, Teacher & Writer. "Per" also has extensive teaching experience. Most recently, Dr. Davenport was associate professor of English at Albany State University and later, at Stillman College. To date, she has published twelve books of poetry and continues to give performances. She currently resides in Northeast Georgia, on traditional Cherokee homelands.

== Works ==
=== Poetry collections ===
- request. Imaginary Friend Press, 2014.
- ascent: poems. CreateSpace Independent Publishing Platform, 2011.
- a hunger for moonlight: poems. self-published, 2006.
- Madness Like Morning Glories: Poems. LSU Press, 2005.
- Soque Street Poems. Sautee-nacoochee Community Association, 1995.
- Voodoo Chile - Slight Return: Poems. Soque Street Press, 1991.
- Eat Thunder & Drink Rain: Poems. self-published, 1982.
- It's Like This. self-published, 1981.

=== Journal articles, essays, and poems ===
- "... Can't Go No Further/Cause You Got Me/Chained and Bound." Appalachian Heritage 36, no. 3 (2008): 56.
- "Weeny (Wiener) Soup." Appalachian Heritage 36, no. 3 (2008): 52.
- "Red Dirt Blues." Appalachian Heritage 36, no. 3 (2008): 54–54.
- "hog killing time." Appalachian Heritage 33, no. 3 (2005): 79–79.
- "Miz Jones." Appalachian Heritage 33, no. 3 (2005): 80–81.
- "Lesson in Excitement." Appalachian Heritage 33, no. 3 (2005): 82–82.
- "Katharine Newman in the after World (s) or MELUS Goes to Hell." MELUS 29, no. 3/4 (2004): 548–553.
- "A Candle for Queen Ida." Black Music Research Journal 23, no. 1/2 (2003): 91-102.
- "Still Here: Ten Years Later..." Tilting the Tower (1999): 215–26.
- "Dismantling white/male supremacy." Social Issues in the English Classroom (1992): 59–75.
- "Pedagogy &/of Ethnic Literature: The Agony & the Ecstasy." MELUS 16, no. 2 (1989): 51–62.
- "Dessa Rose." Black American Literature Forum 20, no. 3 (1986): 335–340.
- "Waves & License." Black American Literature Forum 17, no. 4 (1983): 177–179.
- "Black Lesbians in Academia: Visible Invisibility." Lesbian Studies, Present and Future (1982): 9-11.
- "Dinner With the Orishas-Almost." Callaloo 16 (1982): 125–126.
- "The Pathology of Racism: A Conversation with Third World Wimmin." This Bridge Called My Back: Writings by Radical Women of Color (1981): 85–90.
