= Filomina Clarice Steady =

Sierra Leonean author and academic

Academic background
- Education: Smith College, Northampton, Massachusetts

Filomina Clarice Steady is a Sierra Leonean-born social anthropologist, author, and scholar, known for pioneering work on African feminism, gender studies, environmental justice, and the sociocultural dimensions of race, gender, and globalization. She is Professor Emerita of Africana Studies at Wellesley College, USA.

== Early life and education ==
Steady attended the Annie Walsh School in Sierra Leone. She obtained her Bachelor of Arts degree from Smith College, Northampton, Massachusetts in 1965. In 1982, She received the Otelia Cromwell Distinguished Alumna Award of Smith College.

She earned a Master’s degree from Boston University in Anthropology/African Studies in 1966. Steady went on to complete graduate research at Oxford University, England, obtaining a B.Litt. While studying at St.Anne’s College, Oxford University, she received the Ioma Evans-Pritchard Research Award and later obtained a D.Phil. Oxon. (Ph.D.) in Social Anthropology in 1974.

== Academic career ==
Steady’s academic career spans several decades and multiple institutions. In the early years (1975–78), she served as Lecturer in the Department of Sociology at the University of Sierra Leone. She subsequently held posts in U.S. universities: as visiting lecturer in Anthropology at Yale University (1974), as Assistant Professor of Anthropology and African Studies at Boston University (1975–78), and at Wesleyan University (1978–84). From 1987 to 1993 she directed the Women’s Studies Program at California State University, Sacramento.

Starting in 1997, Steady joined Wellesley College as Professor and later as Chair of the Africana Studies Department (Gender Studies / Environmental Justice), a role she held until retirement, now holding the title of Professor Emerita.

She also had visiting and fellowship appointments, including at the Institute for Environmental Studies, University of Wisconsin–Madison (1993–94). Beyond academia, Steady has been involved in international policy and advocacy. She served multiple roles within the United Nations system: as Deputy Director in the Branch for the Advancement of Women (Vienna, 1984–86), as Special Adviser on Women, Environment and Development to the Secretary-General for the Earth Summit and related UN conferences (1990–93), and as Special Adviser to the UNIDO (Vienna) on integration of women in sustainable industrial development (1995–96).

She was a finalist for the position of Secretary-General of the 1995 United Nations World Conference in Beijing, China. Steady remains active in scholarly review and mentorship: she continues to work with advisory boards and executive committees such as the Association of the World Wide Study of the African Diaspora, the Commission on the Anthropology of Women, and the Association of African Women for Research and Development (AAWORD) of which she is a founding member.

== Research interests and themes ==
Steady’s scholarship emphasizes the intersectionality of race, gender, class, environment, and globalization. Her theoretical orientation is rooted in a critical tradition that challenges Euro-centric frameworks, colonialist legacies, and oversimplified gender discourses. She advocates an “emic” insider perspective that links macro-level structural dynamics with micro-level sociocultural realities.

Her work engages with African and Diaspora experiences, environmental justice, global gender systems, and the sociopolitical impact of corporate globalization and international financial institutions on marginalized communities. Steady characterizes herself as an “activist-scholar,” committed not only to academic analysis but also to policy-oriented research, public advocacy, and applied interventions addressing gender, social, and environmental justice.

== Selected publications ==
- Steady, Filomina Chioma, ed. (2012) [1981]. The Black woman cross-culturally (3rd ed.). Cambridge, Mass: Schenkman Pub. Co. ISBN 978-0-87073-345-1.
- Steady, Filomina Chioma (2006). Women and Collective Action in Africa: Development, Democratization, and Empowerment, with Special Focus on Sierra Leone. Palgrave Macmillan. ISBN 978-1-4039-7083-1.
- Steady, F. (19 December 2011). Women and Leadership in West Africa: Mothering the Nation and Humanizing the State. Springer. ISBN 978-1-137-01039-1.
- Steady, F. (22 June 2009). Environmental Justice in the New Millennium: Global Perspectives on Race, Ethnicity, and Human Rights. Springer. ISBN 978-0-230-62253-1.
- Steady, Filomina Chioma (2005), "An Investigative Framework for Gender Research in Africa in the New Millennium", in Oyěwùmí, Oyèrónké (ed.), African Gender Studies A Reader, New York: Palgrave Macmillan US, pp. 313–331, doi:10.1007/978-1-137-09009-6_17, ISBN 978-1-137-09009-6
- Steady, Filomina Chioma (2001). Women and the Amistad Connection: Sierra Leone Krio Society. Schenkman Books. ISBN 978-0-87047-120-9.
