= Black feminism =

Black feminist identity practices

Black feminism is a branch of feminism that emerged in response to the unique social and political forces Black women face as a collective. These forces—racism and sexism together—shape their lived experience and their intersectional identity. Black feminist thought centers the experiences of Black women, and “aims to empower African-American women within the context of injustice sustained by intersecting oppressions."

According to Black feminism, race, gender, and class discrimination are all aspects of the same system of hierarchy, which bell hooks calls the "imperialist white supremacist, capitalist patriarchy"; due to their inter-dependency, they combine to create something more than experiencing racism and sexism independently. The experience of being a Black woman, according to the theory, cannot then be grasped in terms of being Black or of being a woman but must be illuminated via intersectionality, a term coined by legal scholar Kimberlé Crenshaw in 1989. This idea corresponds with Deborah K. King's idea of "multiple jeopardy" which claims that not only do identities intersect, as Crenshaw suggests, they multiply as well which leads to compounded forms of oppression against Black women. These lens of thinking indicate that each identity—being Black and being female—should be considered both independently and for their interaction effect, in which intersecting identities deepen, reinforce one another, and potentially lead to aggravated forms of inequality.

A Black feminist lens in the United States was first employed by Black women to make sense of how white supremacy and patriarchy interacted to inform the particular experiences of enslaved Black women. Black activists and intellectuals formed organizations such as the National Association of Colored Women (NACW) and the National Council of Negro Women (NCNW). Black feminism rose to prominence in the 1960s, as the civil rights movement excluded women from leadership positions, and the mainstream feminist movement largely focused its agenda on issues that predominantly impacted middle-class White women. From the 1970s to 1980s, Black feminists formed groups that addressed the role of Black women in Black nationalism, gay liberation, and second-wave feminism. Alice Walker, bell hooks, Kimberlé Crenshaw, Angela Davis, and Patricia Hill Collins have emerged as leading academics on Black feminism, while some Black celebrities have encouraged mainstream discussion of Black feminism.

== Early history ==
=== 19th century ===
Black feminist thought emerged from the various forms of oppression Black women faced, beginning with the fact that most African-American women were brought to America as slaves. This oppression is not only physical. As Patricia Hill Collins clarifies, oppression “describes any unjust situation where, systematically and over a long period of time, one group denies another group access to the resources of society.” With this in mind, African-American women also faced oppression of their intellectual thought in order to preserve the dominant (white, male) narrative.

Black women have sought to understand their position within systems of oppression, then this is exemplified in Sojourner Truth's famous speech at the 1851 Women's Convention in Akron, Ohio. Truth’s speech primarily focused on the inadequate treatment of Black women, despite their ability to do the same work and endure the same hardships as men. In her speech Sojourner Truth says, “I have as much muscle as any man, and can do as much work as any man. I have plowed and reaped and husked and chopped and mowed, and can any man do more than that? . . . I can carry as much as any man. . . I am as strong as any man that is now.” This speech invoked arguments for equal rights of both race and gender, emphasizing the need for equality.

The book A Voice from the South (1892), by Anna Julia Cooper has been credited as one of the first pieces of literature that expresses a Black feminist perspective. Cooper's contemporary writer and activist, Frances Ellen Watkins Harper, proposed "some of the most important questions of race, gender, and the work of Reconstruction in the nineteenth century". According to Harper, White women needed suffrage for education, but "Black women need the vote, not as a form of education, but as a form of protection". In the 1890s Ida B. Wells, a trailblazing journalist and activist, became famous for seeking to find the truth about the lynching of Black men, a subject that many White feminists avoided.

=== 1900 to 1960 ===
In the post-slavery period, Black female intellectuals and activists, such as Sojourner Truth, Anna Julia Cooper, Ida B. Wells, Mary Church Terrell, and Frances Harper, set in motion the principles that would become the basis for Black feminism. These women accomplished things that were previously unheard of for Black women, such as giving public lectures, fighting for suffrage, and aiding those in need of help following Reconstruction. However, fissures soon developed between White feminists, even those who had been active in abolition, and pioneering Black feminists.

Suffrage was one of the early areas of a schism between White and Black feminists. Though feminism as a movement was at a rise in the late 1800s and early 1900s, Black women were often left behind and disregarded by the White feminists of this movement. This, however, did not stop the Black feminists, who would eventually create a separate path for themselves fighting for the cause. Out of this, the National Association of Colored Women's Clubs (NACWC) founded in 1904, the National Association for the Advancement of Colored People (NAACP) founded in 1909, and the National Association of Wage Earners founded in 1921, were born.

Black writers of the early 1900s who undertook themes included educator and activist Mary Church Terrell and Zora Neale Hurston. In her autobiography A Colored Woman in a White World (1940), Terrell chronicled her experiences with both racism and sexism. Hurston's substantial number of published works include the novel Their Eyes Were Watching God (1937) featuring a strong female protagonist in Janie Crawford.

Although the decades between the passage of the Nineteenth Amendment to the United States Constitution (1920) and the 1960s are not included among the "wave" periods of feminism, this was a particularly important moment in the development of Black feminist activism. During this period, a few radical Black female activists joined the Communist party or focused on union activism. Although they did not all identify as feminists, their theorizing included important works that are the foundation for theories of intersectionality—integrating race, gender, and class. In 1940, for example, Esther V. Cooper (married name Esther Cooper Jackson) wrote a M.A. thesis called "The Negro Woman Domestic Worker in Relation to Trade Unionism". And in 1949, Claudia Jones wrote "An End to the Neglect of the Problems of the Negro Woman".

Other feminist activism and organizing happened around different cases of racial and sexual violence. For example, Esther Cooper and Rosa Parks organized to help Recy Taylor. In 1944, Taylor was the victim of a gang rape; Parks and Cooper attempted to bring the culprits to justice. Black feminist activists focused on other similar cases, such as the 1949 arrest of and then death sentence issued to Rosa Lee Ingram, a victim of sexual violence. Defenders of Ingram included the famous Black feminist Mary Church Terrell, who was an octogenarian at the time.

Despite often initiating protests, organizing and fundraising events, communicating to the community, and formulating strategies, women in positions of leadership are often overlooked by historians covering the civil rights movement, which began in earnest in the 1950s. Many events, such as the Montgomery bus boycott, were made successful due to the women who distributed information. During the Montgomery bus boycott, 35,000 leaflets were mimeographed and handed out after Rosa Parks' arrest. Georgia Gilmore, after being fired from her job as a cook and black-listed from other jobs in Montgomery due to her contributions to the boycott, organized the Club From Nowhere, a group that cooked and baked to fund the effort.

== Later history ==
=== 1960s and 1970s ===
==== Civil rights movement ====
In the second half of the 20th century, Black feminism as a political and social movement grew out of Black women's feelings of discontent with both the civil rights movement and the feminist movement of the 1960s and 1970s. One of the foundational statements of left-wing Black feminism is "An Argument for Black Women's Liberation as a Revolutionary Force," authored by Mary Ann Weathers and published in February 1969 in Cell 16's radical feminist magazine No More Fun and Games: A Journal of Female Liberation. Weathers states her belief that "women's liberation should be considered as a strategy for an eventual tie-up with the entire revolutionary movement consisting of women, men, and children", but she posits that "[w]e women must start this thing rolling" because:

All women suffer oppression, even white women, particularly poor white women, and especially Indian, Mexican, Puerto Rican, Oriental and Black American women whose oppression is tripled by any of the above-mentioned. But we do have females' oppression in common. This means that we can begin to talk to other women with this common factor and start building links with them and thereby build and transform the revolutionary force we are now beginning to amass.

Additionally, songwriters like Nina Simone, advocated for Black justice and influenced the Civil Rights Movement, through songs like Mississippi Goddamn. Her songs, conveyed in the form of protest, shed light on the racialized and gendered oppression women of color faced at the time. While some others, like Tammy Kernodle, argue that her songs aligned more with militant black power nationalism than the Civil Rights Movement, her contributions still focused on resisting racism and promoting rights for black people. Overall, expressing the importance of the Civil Rights Movement.

Not only did the civil rights movement primarily focus on the oppression of Black men, but many Black women faced severe sexism within civil rights groups such as the Student Nonviolent Coordinating Committee. Within the movement, men dominated the powerful positions. Black feminists did not want the movement to be the struggle only for Black men's rights, they wanted Black women's rights to be incorporated too. This can be seen in a 1963 speech made to The National Council of Negro Women Convention, in which Pauli Murray states “the Negro woman can no longer postpone or subordinate the fight against discrimination because of sex to the civil rights struggle but must carry on both fights simultaneously”. Murray further argues that Black women’s inclusion in the Civil Rights Movement is required for the success of the Movement and achievement of a fully representative society. Black feminists also felt they needed to have their own movement because the complaints of White feminists sometimes differed from their own and favored White women.

In the 1960s, the Student Nonviolent Coordinating Committee (SNCC) was highly active and focused on achieving "a social order of justice" through peaceful tactics. The SNCC was founded by Ella Baker. Baker was a member of the National Association for the Advancement of Colored People (NAACP) and the Southern Christian Leadership Council (SCLC). When Baker served as Martin Luther King Jr.'s SCLC executive secretary, she was exposed to the hierarchical structure of the organization. Baker disapproved of what she saw as sexism within both the NAACP and the SCLC and wanted to start her own organization with an egalitarian structure, allowing women to voice their needs.

In 1964, at a SNNC retreat in Waveland, Mississippi, the members discussed the role of women and addressed sexism that occurred within the group. A group of women in the SNCC (who were later identified as White allies Mary King and Casey Hayden) openly challenged the way women were treated when they issued the "SNCC Position Paper (Women in the Movement)". The paper listed 11 events in which women were treated as subordinate to men. According to the paper, women in SNCC did not have a chance to become the face of the organization, the top leaders, because they were assigned to clerical and housekeeping duties, whereas men were involved in decision-making.

When Stokely Carmichael was elected chair of the SNCC in 1966, he reoriented the path of the organization towards Black Power and Black nationalism. While it is often argued that Black women in the SNCC were significantly subjugated during the Carmichael era, Carmichael appointed several women to posts as project directors during his tenure as chair. By the latter half of the 1960s, more women were in charge of SNCC projects than during the first half. Despite these improvements, the SNCC's leadership positions were occupied by men during the entirety of its existence, which ended in turmoil within a few years of Carmichael's resignation from the body in 1967.

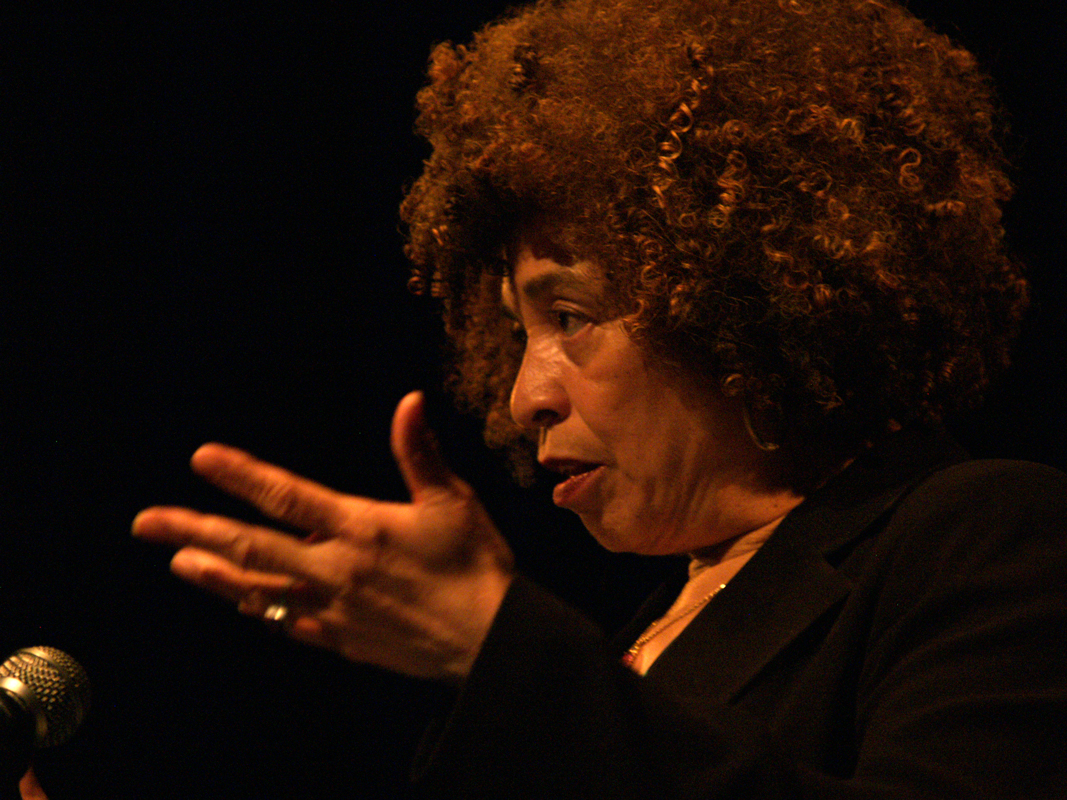
Angela Davis speaking at the University of Alberta on March 28, 2006

The unofficial symbol of Black feminism in the late 60s, a combination of the raised fist of Black Power, and the astrological symbol for Venus, denoted an intersection of ideals of Black Power and militant feminism. Some ideals were shared, such as a "critique on racial capitalism, starting with slavery". Despite this, Black feminism had reasons to become independent of Black nationalism, according to some critics, because it had achieved only a niche within the generally sexist and masculinist structure of Black nationalism.

==== Second-wave feminism ====
The second-wave feminist movement emerged in the 1960s, led by Betty Friedan, whose work The Feminine Mystique centered on “the problem that had no name”—referring to housewives with no right to work. Black women felt alienated by the main planks of the mainstream branches of second-wave feminism, since gaining the right to work outside the home was not viewed as an accomplishment for them; being a housewife was a middle-class problem, and women of color had been working both inside and outside the home for generations due to poverty. Frances Beale wrote, “Another major differentiation is that the white women’s liberation movement is basically middle class. Very few of these women suffer the extreme economic exploitation that most Black women are subject to day by day. If they find housework degrading and dehumanizing, they are financially able to buy their freedom—usually by hiring a black maid.”

Additionally, as Angela Davis later wrote, while Afro-American women and White women were subjected to multiple unwilled pregnancies and had to clandestinely abort, Afro-American women were also suffering from compulsory sterilization programs that were not widely included in dialogue about reproductive justice.

Black Feminist scholars such as Shirley Chisholm and Dorthy Roberts have brought attention to the fact that Black women are disproportionately affected by reproductive, sterilization, and abortion laws. Before Roe v. Wade was passed in 1973, Chisholm was a proponent of reproductive rights and stated “we must put an end to compulsory pregnancy”. In 1999, Roberts' work focused on debunking the so-called “crack baby epidemic” which criminalized and incarcerated Black pregnant mothers—despite the fact that white mothers were just as likely, if not more likely, to engage in substance use while pregnant. These cases resulted in mandating birth control as an alternative to incarceration, and prosecuting Black women at higher rates than their white counterparts. Researchers disproved claims of a “crack baby epidemic” as evidence of alleged catastrophic health conditions was not found.

Some Black feminists who were active in the early second-wave feminism include civil rights lawyer and author Florynce Kennedy, who co-authored one of the first books on abortion, 1971's Abortion Rap; Cellestine Ware, of New York's Stanton-Anthony Brigade; and Patricia Robinson. These women "tried to show the connections between racism and male dominance" in society.

Fighting against racism and sexism across the White dominated second wave feminist movement and male dominated Black Power and Black Arts Movement, Black feminist groups of artists such as Where We At! Black Women Artists Inc were formed in the early 1970s. The "Where We At" group was formed in 1971 by artists Vivian E. Browne and Faith Ringgold. During the summer of that year, the group organized the first exhibition in history of only Black women artists to show the viewing public that Black artist was not synonymous with Black male artist. In 1972, Where We At! issued a list of demands to the Brooklyn Museum protesting what it saw as the museum's ignoring of Brooklyn's Black women artists. The demands brought forth changes, and years later, in 2017, the museum's exhibit "We Wanted a Revolution: Black Radical Women 1965-1985" celebrated the work of Black women artists who were part of the Black Arts and Black Power movements.

During the 20th century, Black feminism evolved quite differently from mainstream feminism. In the late 1900s it was influenced by new writers such as Alice Walker whose literary works spawned the term womanism, which emphasized the degree of the oppression Black women faced when compared to White women and, for her, encompassed "the solidarity of humanity".

==== Black lesbian feminism ====
Black lesbian feminism, as a political identity and movement, arose out of a compound set of grievances involving race, gender, social class, as well as sexual orientation. Black lesbian women were often unwelcome in male-dominated Black movements, and tended to be marginalized not only in mainstream second wave feminism (as exemplified by Betty Friedan who held off making lesbian rights part of her political agenda) but also within the lesbian feminist movement itself. Here the problem was perhaps one more of class than of race. Among lesbian feminism's largely White, middle class leadership, the butch/femme sexual style, fairly common among Black and working class lesbian pairings, was often deprecated as a degrading imitation of male dominate heterosexuality.

During the 1970s lesbian feminists created their own sector of feminism in response to the unwillingness of mainstream second wave feminism to embrace their cause. They developed a militant agenda, broadly challenging homophobia and demanding a respected place within feminism. Some advocated and experimented with as complete a social separation from men as possible. These separatist notions were off-putting to Black lesbian feminists involved in Black Power movements and tended to deepen their feelings of alienation from a largely White-led movement. As Anita Cornwell stated, "When the shooting starts any Black is fair game. the bullets don't give a damn whether I sleep with a woman or a man".

In 1970, a defining moment for Black lesbian feminists occurred at the Black Panther's Revolutionary People's Constitutional Convention in Philadelphia, Pennsylvania. Several Black lesbian feminists confronted a group of White lesbian feminists about what they saw as a racially divisive agenda. Following this event, several groups began to include and organize around Black lesbian politics. For example, in 1973, the National Black Feminist Organization was founded and included a lesbian agenda. In 1975, the Combahee River Collective was founded out of experiences and feelings of sexism in the Black Power movements and racism in the lesbian feminist movement. The primary focus of this collective was to fight what they saw as interlocking systems of oppression and raise awareness of these systems.

In 1978, the National Coalition of Black Lesbians and Gays was founded. In addition to the multiple organizations that focused on Black lesbian feminism, there were many authors that contributed to this movement, such as Audre Lorde, Barbara Smith, Pat Parker, June Jordan, Darlene Pagano, Kate Rushin, Doris Davenport, Cheryl Clarke, Margaret Sloan-Hunter, and a number of others.

=== 1980s and 1990s ===
In the early 1990s, AWARE (African Woman's Action for Revolutionary Exchange) was formed in New York by Reena Walker and Laura Peoples after a plenary session on Black women's issues held at the Malcolm X Conference at the Borough of Manhattan Community College (BMCC) entitled Black Women and Black Liberation: Fighting Oppression and Building Unity. In 1991, the Malcolm X Conference was held again at BMCC, and the theme that year was "Sisters Remember Malcolm X: A Legacy to be Transformed". It featured plenary sessions, a workshop on "Sexual Harassment: Race, Gender and Power", and was held in a much larger theater that year. Black women were a central focus and not an aside as they were prior. Speakers included Sonia Sanchez, Audre Lorde, Verniece Miller, Reena Walker, Carol Bullard (Asha Bandele), and Vivian Morrison. At the same time, Reena Walker, along with the members of AWARE, also worked in coalition with AWIDOO (American Women in Defense of Ourselves), formed by Barbara Ransby, to sign a full-page ad in The New York Times to stand in support of Anita Hill.

In 1995, Reena Walker went on to put out the call to various women and organized the group African Americans Against Violence that effectively stopped a parade that a group of reverends led by Al Sharpton were attempting to hold in Harlem for Mike Tyson. The group, including Eve and Kathe Sandler, Nsia Bandele, and Indigo Washington, worked successfully to stop the parade from happening, bringing attention to the struggle of Black women against sexism and domestic violence. A supporter of Mike Tyson, social worker Bill Jones, exclaimed "The man has paid his debt" (in regards to Tyson's rape conviction), and joined a large group of other Tyson supporters in heckling the African Americans Against Violence group, accusing them of "catering to white radical feminists".

==== African Feminism and Decolonial Black Feminist Thought ====
While Black feminism in the Americas was gaining visibility through movements such as the Combahee River Collective, parallel intellectual and activist traditions were emerging across Africa. These efforts challenged colonial and Western feminist paradigms that often marginalized African epistemologies. From the late 1970s onward, the Association of African Women for Research and Development (AAWORD) and Development Alternatives with Women for a New Era (DAWN) became central to redefining feminism in light of African social realities rather than imported frameworks.

Scholars, including Amina Mama, Filomina Chioma Steady, and Molara Ogundipe-Leslie, critiqued the dominance of Women-in-Development (WID) models, which portrayed women as passive recipients of aid, and instead called for feminist research grounded in African contexts. Mama emphasized that feminist scholarship in Africa must address the continued marginalization of women despite decades of development policy. Steady argued that research agendas imposed by global institutions often recolonized African social science through Eurocentric priorities. At the same time, Ogundipe-Leslie’s concept of Stiwanism (Social Transformation Including Women in Africa) linked gender equality with post-colonial nation-building.

African feminist thought has also examined how historical and archival practices shape collective memory. By addressing gaps and silences in historical records, African feminist researchers and curators have sought to recover women’s experiences that were long excluded from official narratives. In community archives, educational programs, and museum initiatives, these approaches treat documentation as a form of social justice and collective care, emphasizing local stewardship and the ethical responsibility to represent women’s histories accurately.

Contemporary feminist institutions and scholars in Ghana have continued this work through leadership in local governance, education, and public culture. These initiatives frame women not as subjects of development but as active participants and curators of their own historical futures. In this sense, African feminism operates simultaneously as scholarship and as public history, transforming the archive from a site of omission into one of collective visibility and care.

==== Hip-hop culture ====
A medium of oppression for Black women in the 1980s and '90s was hip-hop music. The New York hip-hop scene was mainly dominated my men and most producers were focused on rap superstars such as Notorious B.I.G. and Sean "Diddy" Combs. A number of female emcees can be credited for having expanded Black womanhood in music during this time; notable artists in the '80s such as MC Lyte, Queen Latifah, and Salt-N-Pepa carved out space for later black female artists. Throughout the '80s and '90s, black female rappers were classified into four categories, often seamlessly traveling between or blending a number of labels together. The categories included the wise "Queen Mother," an intelligent, Afro-centric, and activist-driven image, the beautiful and outspoken "Fly Girl," characterized by fashionable clothes and a self-sufficient attitude, the rebellious "Sista with Attitude," an intensely assertive image that threatened patriarchal stereotypes, and the revolutionary "Lesbian," which openly defied heteronormative ideals. While the first three groups emerged throughout the '80s, the "Lesbian" category was not recognized until the '90s, popularized by the release of Queen Pen's track, "Girlfriend;" until then, gay and lesbian hip-hop artists were alleged. Black female emcees used these categories, and various combinations of their respective images, to address issues that affected Black women and girls and push the boundaries of a historically misogynistic and homophobic industry.

In the 1990s, Lil' Kim who was signed to Biggie Smalls' Junior M.A.F.I.A. Imprint, expressed her message. She achieved an image of fierce independence and comfort with her body. She defied the presumption in hip-hop that women are there to humble the presence of men. Within the culture of hip hop, Lil’ Kim challenges the stereotype of Black women’s invincibility given she “was never one to shy away from expressing her insecurities and struggles”. Lil' Kim's outspokenness and unprecedented lyrics were rejected by many people who believed in the traditional sound of hip-hop. Lil' Kim stood behind her words and never apologized for who she is. Faith Evans is another female emcee who broke barriers in the hip-hop world. At just 21 years old, she was the first female artist signed to Bad Boy Records. Faith Evans spent more than 20 years in the music business fighting gender discrimination and harassment in an industry where men were the dominant content creators and producers.

Mary J. Blige was another artist who became an advocate of women's empowerment in hip-hop. She was a singer who influenced the Bad Boy Records label, although she was never signed by them. Together, these women brought a new perspective that gave women in hip-hop a voice.

Hip-hop feminism, first coined by Joan Morgan in 1999, is considered to be a branch of Black feminism that Author Gwendolyn D. Pough described hip-hop feminists as people who are "immersed in hip-hop culture" and actively advocate against gender discrimination within that culture. She asserts that hip-hop feminists share the same predecessors as black feminists and womanists, inherently connecting the missions and goals of the two communities and grounding them both in the examination of racial, class, and gender-based discrimination.

Writers who were figureheads for Black feminism such as Joan Morgan, Denise Cooper, and others from the Third Wave of Black feminism blended their passions for hip-hop culture and Black feminism or womanism, ultimately leading to the inception of hip-hop feminism.

The shifting political landscape of the 1980s and 1990s helped shape hip-hop feminism. Specifically, the elimination of welfare programs and affirmative action, the emergence of the AIDS epidemic, and the increasing size of the racial wealth gap served as catalysts for the formation of a new, distinct form of Black feminism: hip-hop feminism.

Dr. Whitney A. Peoples argues that examples of Black women being sexually objectified in hip-hop are hyper prominent due to deep-seated racist ideologies and stereotypes that deem Black women as sexually and morally deviant. Hip-hop feminism explores hip-hop as a vehicle for addressing the complexities of misogyny in hip-hop and any discrepancies in mainstream feminism. More than speaking out against misogyny in hip-hop, however, a key characteristic of hip-hop feminism has been said to be its mission to uplift black women and girls who partake in hip-hop culture in their everyday lives. Black women grapple with some of the complexities and influences of hip-hop culture within discourse and writing surrounding black feminists and hip-hop feminists.

=== 21st century ===
In the 21st century, new digital platforms have transformed black feminism, creating new pathways for activism. As stated by Catherine Steele in her book Digital Black Feminism (2021), the internet and social media platforms have provided Black feminists with the ability to amplify their voices to target more people. Steele argues that digital spaces have created a "virtual commons" where Black women can gather to discuss and share experiences around issues of racial and gender justice. This digital activism has particularly influenced movements such as #SayHerName. The #SayHerName social media campaign, launched through the African American Policy Forum has been used to amplify the stories of Black women who have been victims of police brutality, as their stories are often overlooked in mainstream media. In addition to social media activism, digital Black feminism has also evolved into a broader practice of community documentation and participatory archiving. African feminist scholars have emphasized how digital technologies can strengthen women’s civic participation and preserve social memory. Across Ghana and other African contexts, women’s organizations have incorporated storytelling, oral histories, and digital media into programs that document lived experiences of inequality and resilience. These projects link gender activism with public history by transforming records of everyday life into shared resources for education and advocacy. Together, these developments illustrate how digital Black feminism operates not only as a mode of political mobilization but also as a living archive of collective memory and care, bridging global and African feminist movements through digital and historical work. Building on these curatorial and archival approaches, online platforms continue to serve as dynamic spaces for activism and community-making. Using hashtags and social media content on digital platforms has broadened the black feminist movement's reach and increased their accessibility. As a result, platforms such as "Black Twitter" have developed new spaces for education and activism on Black women's experiences, pushing for systemic change.

==== Black Feminism in Media ====
Digital age feminism involved the use of Facebook, Twitter, Instagram, YouTube, Tumblr, and other forms of social media to discuss gender equality and social justice. According to NOW Toronto, the internet created a "call-out" culture, in which sexism or misogyny can be called out and challenged immediately with relative ease.

Social media served as a medium for Black feminists to express praise or discontent with organizations' representations of Black women. Lizzo, for example, has been using social media, especially Instagram, to promote diverse black bodies. She often speaks against the racism and pushback she gets as a powerful, fat, black woman musician She has stated: "I make Black music, period... I'm doing this sh*t for the big Black women in the future who just want to live their lives without being scrutinized or put into boxes".

Black Girl Magic (#BlackGirlMagic) is a movement that was popularized by CaShawn Thompson in 2013. The concept was born as a way to "celebrate the beauty, power and resilience of Black women". Thompson began to use the hashtag #BlackGirlsAreMagic in 2013 to speak about the positive achievements of Black women. It also emphasises the idea that black girls thrive and prevail while enduring blockages and structural walls daily. Although it was popularized on social media, the movement has inspired many organizations to host events using the title, along with support from celebrities and politicians globally.

Alleged instances of the "appropriation" of Black culture were commented on. For example, a 2015 Vogue Italia photo shoot involving model Gigi Hadid wearing an afro sparked backlash on Twitter, Instagram, and Facebook. Some users claimed it was problematic and racist to have a non-Black model wear an afro and a fake tan to give the appearance of Blackness when the fashion magazine could have hired a Black model instead. Kearie Daniel wrote that White people wearing certain hairstyles is a particularly touchy subject in Black feminism because of the perceived double standard that when White women wear Black hairstyles, they are deemed "trendy" or "edgy", while Black women are labelled "ghetto" or "unprofessional".

Black feminists also voiced the importance of increasing "representation" of Black women in television and movies. According to a 2014 study by the University of Southern California, of the 100 top films of that year, "nearly three-quarters of all characters were white", NPR reports, and only 17 of those 100 top movies featured non-White lead or co-lead actors. That number falls further when only looking at non-White women leads, considering only one-third of speaking roles were for women, according to the same study.

Conjure Feminism

A new form of Black feminism has emerged with the publication of the article "Conjure Feminism: Toward a Genealogy" published in a special issue on conjure feminism in Hypatia Journal in 2021. The conjure feminism theory incorporates Black women's knowledges of African derived spiritualities to guide their methods of survival in the U.S. and the African diaspora more broadly. Black feminist scholars Kinitra Brooks, Kameelah Martin, and LaKisha Simmons co-wrote the Hypatia journal article on conjure feminism and co-edited the special issue. Other publications on conjure feminist themes include Kameelah Martin's (2012) Conjuring Moments in African American literature: Women, Spirit Work, and Other Such Hoodoo and Envisioning Black Feminist Voodoo Aesthetics: African Spirituality in American Cinema (2019); The Lemonade Reader (2019) edited by Kinitra Brooks and Kameelah Martin; and Patricia Coloma Peñate's The Erotic as a Marvelous Real Paradigm: Hurston and Conjure Feminism (2023).

==== Black Lives Matter ====
The activist movement Black Lives Matter was initially formed by Opal Tometi, Alicia Garza, and Patrisse Kahn-Cullors as a hashtag to campaign against racism and police brutality against African Americans in the United States. The movement contributed to a revitalization and re-examining of the Black feminist movement. While the deaths of Black men played a major part in the Black Lives Matter movement, Rekia Boyd, Michelle Cusseaux, Tanisha Anderson, Shelly Frey, Yvette Smith, Eleanor Bumpurs, Sandra Bland, and other women were also killed or assaulted by police officers.

While Black Lives Matter has been critiqued for a failure to focus on Black women's treatment by the police, Black feminists within the movement have fought to highlight the interconnected systems of oppression that disadvantage Black women in particular. Activism of Black feminists in Black Lives Matter has included protests against political candidates such as Bernie Sanders, Donald Trump, and Hillary Clinton, and they have used hashtags such as #oscarssowhite and #sayhername to challenge both racial and gender injustices. In addition to traditional protests, black feminists have developed community-based workshops, offered mental health resources, and educated people to advocate for institutional change. These are impactful efforts that cultivate supportive spaces and provide tools to address the trauma Black women experience.

== Black feminist identity politics and safe spaces ==
Black feminist identity politics can be defined as knowing and understanding one's own identity while taking into consideration both personal experience as well as the experiences of those in history to help form a group of like-minded individuals who seek change in the political framework of society. It also can be defined as a rejection of oppressive measures taken against one's group, especially in terms of political injustice.

Black feminist writer Patricia Hill Collins believes that this "outsider within" seclusion suffered by Black women was created through the domestic sphere, where Black women were considered separate from the perceived White elite who claimed their dominance over them. They also felt a disconnect between the Black men's suffering and oppression. As a result of White feminists excluding Black women from their discourse, Black feminists expressed their own experiences of marginalization and empowered Black consciousness in society. Due to the diverse experiences of Black women, it is imperative to Collins to speak for and of personal accounts of Black women's oppression.

Identity politics have often implemented race, class, and gender as isolated categories as a means of excluding those who are not perceived as part of the dominant group. These constructed biases formed from race, class, and gender are what feminist Kimberlé Crenshaw believes need to be used, not as a means of degradation, but as a form of empowerment and self-worth. Ignoring these differences only creates more of a divide between social movements and other feminist groups, especially in the case of violence against women where the caliber of violence is correlated with components such as race and class.

Another issue of identity politics is the conflict of group formations and safe spaces for Black women. In the 1970s, increased literacy among Black women promoted writing and scholarship as an outlet for feminist discourse where they could have their voices heard. As a result, Black women sought solace in safe spaces that gave them the freedom to discuss issues of oppression and segregation that ultimately promoted unity as well as a means of achieving social justice.

As the notion of color-blindness advocated for a desegregation in institutions, Black women faced new issues of identity politics and looked for a new safe space to express their concerns. This was met with a lot of contention, as people saw these Black female groups as exclusive and separatist. Dominant groups, especially involved in the political sphere, found these safe spaces threatening because they were away from the public eye and were therefore unable to be regulated by the higher and more powerful political groups.

Despite the growth in feminist discourse regarding Black identity politics, some men disagree with the Black feminist identity politics movement. Some Black novelists, such as Kwame Anthony Appiah, uphold the notion of color-blindness and dismiss identity politics as a proper means of achieving social justice. To him, identity politics is an exclusionary device implemented in Black culture and history, like hip hop and jazz, that limit outsider comprehension and access. However, writer Jeffery A. Tucker believes that identity politics serves as a foundation where such color-blindness can finally be achieved in the long run if implemented and understood within society.

== Organizations ==
National Black Feminist Organization

The National Black Feminist Organization was founded in 1973, and dissolved around 1977. This organization of women focused on the interconnectedness of the many prejudices faced by African-American women; stating that their mission was to define their self-image as Black women and not be rejected by White women. There were chapters in major cities, and the organization fought for political influence and raised consciousness about the abuse facing their communities. In 1975, Barbara Smith, Beverly Smith, Cheryl L. Clarke, Akasha Gloria Hull, and other female activists tied to The Civil Rights Movement, Black nationalism, or the Black Panther Party established, as an offshoot of the National Black Feminist Organization, the Combahee River Collective, a radical lesbian feminist group.

=== The Combahee River Collective ===
The Combahee River Collective (1974–1980) was one of the most important Black socialist feminist organizations of all time. This group began meeting in Boston in 1974, a time when socialist feminism was thriving in Boston. The name Combahee River Collective was suggested by the founder and African-American lesbian feminist, Barbara Smith, and refers to the campaign led by Harriet Tubman, who freed 750 slaves near the Combahee River in South Carolina in 1863. Smith said they wanted the name to mean something to African-American women and that "it was a way of talking about ourselves being on a continuum of Black struggle, of Black women's struggle". The Combahee River Collective opposed the practice of lesbian separatism, considering that, in practice, separatists focused exclusively on sexist oppression and not on other oppressions (race, class, etc.)

The members of this organization consisted of many former members of other political organizations that worked within The Civil Rights Movement, Anti-War movement, Labor Movement, and others. Demita Frazier, co-founder of the Combahee River Collective, says these women from other movements found themselves "in conflict with the lack of a feminist analysis and in many cases were left feeling divided against [themselves]." The Combahee River Collective argued in 1974 that the liberation of Black women entails freedom for all people, since it would require the end of racism, sexism, and class oppression. Within the Black Feminisms: Combahee River Collective Statement of 1977, they spoke on how it is, "...difficult to separate race from class from sex oppression because in our [black women's'] lives they are the most often experienced simultaneously". The Combahee River Collective articulated this interlocking system of oppression based on sexism, heterosexism, racism, and classism is due to the lack of basic human rights provided to black women in comparison to other groups, such as white women. White women fighting for feminism is distinct from black women fighting for black feminism, as white women need only to address one form of oppression [sexism] versus many forms of oppression, like black women. Therefore, the black feminists of the Combahee River Collective aimed for an inclusive rather than exclusive movement because, "The major source of difficulty in our political work is that we are not just trying to fight oppression on one front or even two, but instead to address a whole range of oppressions. We do not have racial, sexual, heterosexual, or class privilege to rely upon, nor do we have even the minimal access to resources and power that groups who possess any one of these types of privilege have."

As an organization, they were labeled as troublemakers, and many said they were brainwashed by the man-hating White feminist, that they did not have their own mind, and that they were just following in the White woman's footsteps. Throughout the 1970s, the Combahee River Collective met weekly to discuss the different issues concerning Black feminists. They also held retreats throughout the Northeast from 1977 to 1979 to help "institutionalize Black feminism" and develop an "ideological separation from white feminism".

As an organization, they founded a local battered women's shelter and worked in partnership with all community activists, women and men, and gay and straight people, playing an active role in the reproductive rights movement. The Combahee River Collective ended their work together in 1980 and is now most widely remembered for developing the Combahee River Collective Statement, a key document in the history of contemporary Black feminism and the development of the concepts of identity. Given the success of the Combahee River Collective in the fight against racism in Boston, the Organization became a “blueprint” for future Black feminist organizations.

=== The National Welfare Rights Organization (NWRO) ===
Many Black women fought for their rights to public institutions and benefits, and many were members of The National Welfare Rights Organization (NWRO). The NWRO, founded in 1966, was a federation that encompassed many different, locally created welfare organizations. When it was created, the NWRO “represented the first major attempt to build a national grassroots movement among welfare mothers”.

The Aid To Dependent Children Program (ADC) received criticism from welfare rights activists. Specifically, in the 1960s, eighty five percent of ADC recipients in Philadelphia, Pennsylvania were Black women, and the ADC instituted midnight raids. During midnight raids, authorities inspected the homes of welfare recipients without a warrant, during the middle of the night. This resulted in it becoming harder for Black women to receive aid. Furthermore, Johnnie Tillmon, who served as executive director of the NWRO, writes about her intersecting experience of being a Black woman on welfare, and how welfare policies, such as the ADC program, are sexist. Tillmon mentions how she is a part of starting the Guaranteed Adequate Income (GAI) plan, under the NWRO.

More Organizations

- National Association of Colored Women (NACW)
- National Council of Negro Women (NCNW)

== Black feminist literature ==
Michelle Cliff believes that there is continuity "in the written work of many African American Women, ... you can draw a line from the slave narrative of Linda Brent to Elizabeth Keckley's life, to Their Eyes were Watching God (by Zora Neale Hurston) to Coming of Age in Mississippi (Anne Moody) to Sula (by Toni Morrison), to the Salt Eaters (by Toni Cade Bambara) to Praise Song for the Widow (by Paule Marshall)." Cliff believes that all of these women, through their stories, "Work against the odds to claim the 'I'".

Identity:

- 1970, Black Woman's Manifesto, published by the Third World Women's Alliance, argued for a specificity of oppression against Black women. Co-signed by Gayle Lynch, Eleanor Holmes Norton, Maxine Williams, Frances M. Beal, and Linda La Rue, the manifesto, opposing both racism and capitalism, stated that "the Black woman is demanding a new set of female definitions and a recognition of herself of a citizen, companion, and confidant, not a matriarchal villain or a step stool baby-maker. Role integration advocates the complementary recognition of man and woman, not the competitive recognition of same." Additionally, Toni Cade Bambara edited the eclectic volume The Black Woman: An Anthology (1970) which sought to "explore ourselves and set the record straight on the matriarch and the evil Black bitch." It featured now considered canonical essays, such as Frances Beal's "Double Jeopardy: To Be Black and Female" and Toni Cade Bambara's "On the Issue of Roles."
- 1979, Barbara Smith and Lorraine Bethel edited the Autumn 1979 issue of Conditions. Conditions 5 was "the first widely distributed collection of Black feminist writing in the U.S."
- 1992, Black feminists mobilized "a remarkable national response" to the Anita Hill-Clarence Thomas Senate Hearings in 1991, naming their effort African American Women in Defense of Ourselves.
- 1994, Evelyn Hammonds: "Black (W)holes and The Geometry of Black Female Sexuality" Evelyn Hammonds begins her essay by reflecting, as a Black lesbian and feminist writer, on the "consistently exclusionary practices of lesbian and gay studies" that produce such problematic paucities as the presence of writers of color, articles written on Black women's sexuality by Black women that complexly examine race in representations of gender, and the visibility of Black lesbian experiences (Hammonds, 127). Hammonds articulates how Whiteness defines the canonical "categories, identities, and subject positions" of lesbian and gay studies and depends on maintaining and presupposing patterns of Black women and Black lesbian sexualities' invisibility and absence (Hammonds, 128).
- 2000, Alice Walker: "In Search of Our Mothers Garden" This articulation is directly linked to Hammonds' concern about the visibility and audibility of Black queer sexualities, since Black women's sexualities are perceived as always invisible or absent, then lesbian and queer Black women and authors must follow as doubly invisible. While White sexuality as the normative sexuality has been challenged by other writers, Hammonds frames her intervention as reaching beyond the limits of this familiar critique. To effectively challenge the hegemony of Whiteness within Queer theory, Hammonds charges lack feminists with the major projects of reclaiming sexuality so that Black women and their sexualities may register as present and power relations between White women and Black women's expression of gender and sexuality becomes a part of theory making within Queer studies (Hammonds, 131).
- 2000, in her introduction to the 2000 reissue of the 1983 Black feminist anthology Home Girls, theorist and author Barbara Smith states her opinion that "to this day most Black women are unwilling to jeopardize their 'racial credibility' (as defined by Black men) to address the realities of sexism." Smith also notes that "even fewer are willing to bring up homophobia and heterosexism, which are, of course, inextricably linked to gender oppression."
- 2011, Black Internationalist Feminism: Women Writers of the Black Left, 1945-1995 by Cheryl Higashida looks at Black women writers and their contributions to the feminist movement. Higashida "illustrates how literature is a crucial lens for studying Black internationalist feminism because these authors were at the forefront of bringing the perspectives and problems of black women to light against their marginalization and silencing." Included in her work are writers such as Rosa Guy, Lorraine Hansberry, Audre Lorde, and Maya Angelou.
- 2014, On Intersectionality by Kimberlé Crenshaw. A collection of essays and articles that expand on defining the concept of intersectionality.

Call to Action:

Angela Davis

Angela Davis, born in January 26, 1944, was known as a lecturer, author, and political activist. Through her writing, “Women, Race, & Class (1981),” she brings up the idea of intersectionality, although not coined at the time, and its impacts on Black women. Critics argued this writing did not provide enough information on how to overcome racism and sexism, causing disappointments; however, it still informed readers of the marginalization of Black experiences within the Women's Movement. She also wrote, "Freedom Is A Constant Struggle," which discusses the significance of prison abolition intersecting with feminism and racism. Davis explains the importance in being an active, lifelong activist.

Audre Lorde

- "The Transformation of Silence into Language and Action" (speech) (1977). Audre Lorde, a black feminist feminist poet, was diagnosed with cancer causing her to reflect on her silence, a silence that caused her to lose herself. Through her poem, “The Transformation of Silence into Language and Action," she sought to teach women the importance of embracing your identity, including your sexuality and oppressions, through voice. This acknowledges the topic of direct activism, as Lorde advocates that when we actively communicate with different groups of people, we are actively fighting oppression.
- "Uses of the Erotic: The Erotic as Power'' (1978). Lorde writes that channeling love and power within ourselves is important since this will allow individuals to better connect with other people. Then, this will in turn bring people together and fight oppression, such as the oppression facing Black women.
- "The Master's Tools Will Never Dismantle the Master's House" (speech) (1979). Lorde argues that tokenism and exclusion of Black women in academic feminist spaces is degenerative to the anti-oppressive nature of feminism. By maintaining ignorance of both difference between racial experiences and the intellectual production of Black feminists, Lorde contends, white feminists maintain racist and patriarchal hierarchy.

Welfare Activism:

In 1972, "Welfare Is a Women's Issue" in Ms. Magazine. Johnnie Tillmon writes their experiences as being a Black woman on welfare and critiques the current welfare policies and welfare politics at the time, mentioning Ronald Reagan and the Aid to Dependent Children Program (ADC).

Misogynoir:

Other theorists and writers who have contributed to the literature of Black feminism include Moya Bailey and Trudy of Gradient Lair, who both write about the anti-Black and/or racist misogyny against Black women, also known as misogynoir, a term coined by Bailey in 2008. In 2018, both these women wrote an article named "On Misogynoir: Citation, erasure and plagiarism", which talks about the works of Black feminists often being plagiarized or erased from most literary works, also implicitly and sometimes explicitly linked to gender oppression, particularly for women of color.

Misogynoir is grounded in the theory of intersectionality. Modern-day Black activists, such as Feminista Jones, claim that "Misogynoir provides a racialized nuance that mainstream feminism wasn't catching" and that "there is a specific misogyny that is aimed at Black women and is uniquely detrimental to Black women."

More Topics in Black Feminist literature:

- 1989, Kimberlé Crenshaw, Demarginalizing the Intersection of Race and Sex: A Black Feminist Critique of Antidiscrimination Doctrine, Feminist Theory and Antiracist Politics. This legal forum paper is regarded as where Kimberlé Crenshaw is the first person to officially coin the term intersectionality.
- "Mow to Now: Black Feminism Resets the Chronology of the Founding of Modern Feminism" (2018) by Carol Giardina explores Black women and their involvement with the organizing of the 1963 March on Washington for Jobs and Freedom (MOW). Particular focus is given to how this was pivotal to the shift of feminist organizing of the 1960s. Many activists are noted, including Dorothy Height, Pauli Murray, and Anna Arnold Hedgeman. Facing powerful male figures from the church, they established feminist protest models that they subsequently used to inform the establishment of the National Organization for Women in 1966.
- The involvement of Pat Parker in the Black feminist movement was reflected in her writings as a poet. Her work inspired other Black feminist poets such as Hattie Gossett.
- The Encyclopedia of African-American Women Writers (2007) and the Encyclopedia of Feminist Literature (2006) list influential Black Feminist Literature.

== Critics ==
Critics of Black feminism argue that divisions along the lines of race or gender weaken the strength of the overall feminist and anti-racist movements.

== See also ==
- Womanism
- African-American women's suffrage movement
- Black Girl Magic
- Black matriarchy
- Intersectionality
- Misogyny in hip hop culture
  - From Black Power to Hip Hop: Racism, Nationalism, and Feminism
  - Black Sexual Politics: African Americans, Gender, and the New Racism
- PaVEM
- Postcolonial feminism
- Purplewashing
- Separatist feminism
- Third World feminism
- Triple oppression
- White feminism
