= Margo Okazawa-Rey =

Japanese-American academic (born 1949)

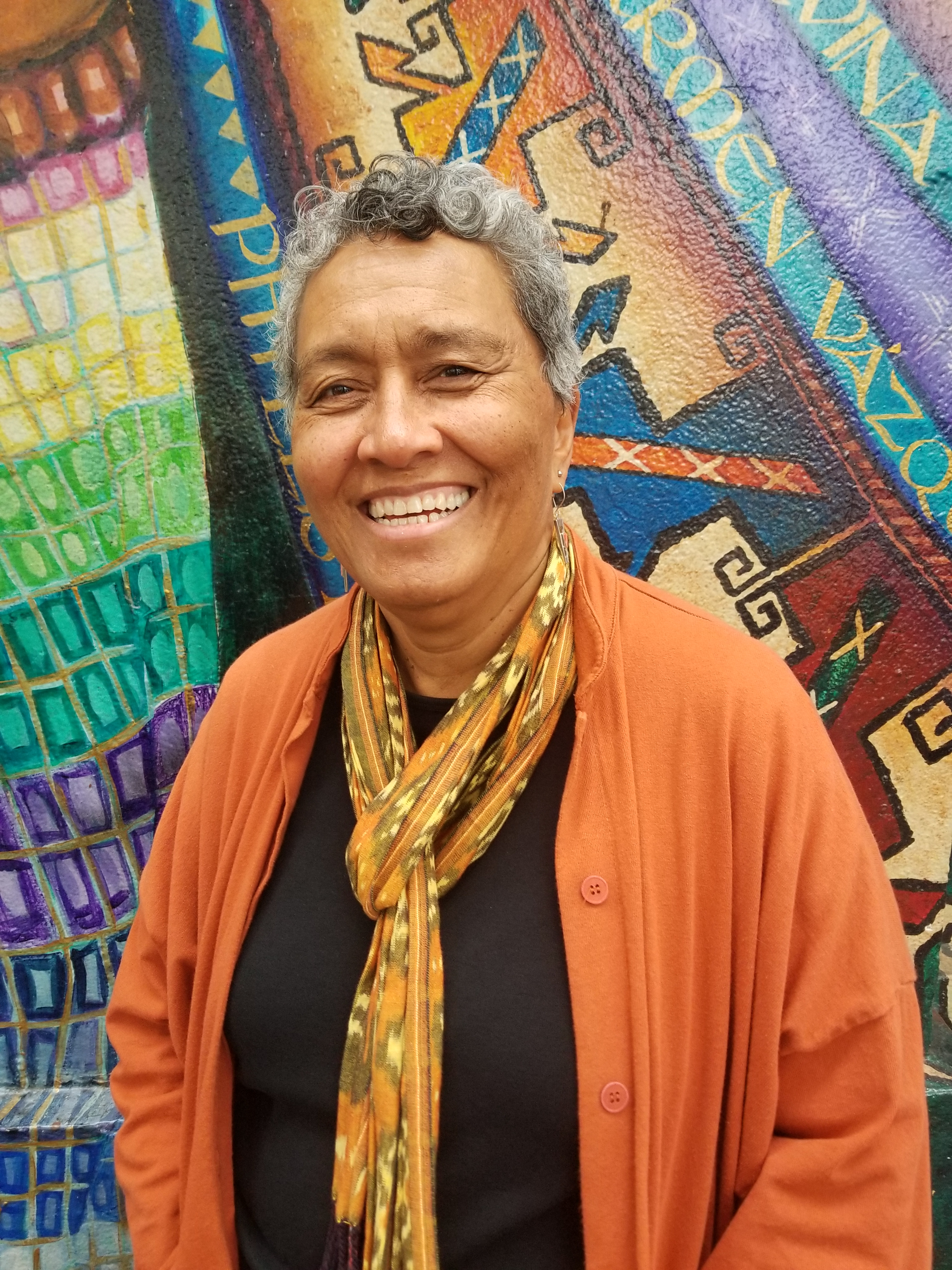
- Okazawa-Rey in 2019
- Born: November 26, 1949 (age 76); Kobe, Japan

Margo Okazawa-Rey (November 26, 1949, Japan) is a Black and Japanese American professor emerita, educator, writer, and social justice activist, who is most known as a founding member of the Combahee River Collective, and for her transnational feminist advocacy.

Through her research and activism, she explores and shares the interconnections between militarism and globalization of the economy, problems within communities of color in the United States and globally, and fights for the security of women worldwide.

== Early life ==
Okazawa-Rey was born in Kobe, Japan, to an African-American father and a Japanese mother and cites her mixed-race heritage made possible by American occupation of Japan as influencing her work on anti-militarism. At the age of ten, she moved to the United States.

In 1973, Okazawa-Rey received a B.A. from Capital University Department of Sociology. Followed by in 1974 when she received a M.S.S. from Boston University School of Social Work. In 1987, she received her Ed.D. from Harvard Graduate School of Education.

== Career ==
=== Positions ===
Okazawa-Rey is professor emerita, San Francisco State University. She also was core faculty in the Doctoral Program of the School of Human and Organization Development at the Fielding Graduate University in Santa Barbara, California.

From 1974 to 1982, Okazawa-Rey worked as social worker in Dorchester and Roxbury, Massachusetts, and co-founded CARE (Campaign for Anti-Racist Education).

From 1979 to 2003, she held various teaching positions such as in the School of Human Services at New Hampshire College in Manchester, in the Education department at Simmons College, an assistant professor at the University of Maryland, Baltimore, and a professor and undergraduate program coordinator at San Francisco State University.

Okazawa-Rey held the Jane Watson Irwin Chair at Hamilton College from 1999 to 2001, then returned in 2014 to 2016 as the Elihu Root Chair in Women's Studies.

From 2002 to 2005, Okazawa-Rey worked as the director of Mills College's Women's Leadership Institute, a position which no longer exists. Along with this, she was a visiting professor teaching social policy and U.S. Women of Color. During this time at Mills College, she proposed the Barbara Lee Distinguished Chair in Women's Leadership in honor of the former congresswoman and alumni Barbara Lee. Okazawa-Rey then returned to Mills College from 2010 to 2011 to take hold of the Barbara Lee Distinguished Chair in Women's Leadership, returning in 2018 to take on the two year position once again.

=== Research, influence, and ideology ===
As a founding member of the Combahee River Collective in the mid-1970s, it shaped her scholarship and activism and the framework of intersectionality has informed her activism on military violence against women, inter/intra-ethnic conflicts, and critical multicultural education in Boston, Washington, DC, and the San Francisco Bay Area. Furthermore, she co-convened "Women Redefining Security" conferences in Okinawa, Washington, D.C, and Seoul, Korea.

Okazawa-Rey's specific areas of interest are militarism, armed conflict, and violence against women. In her research, she examined the connections between militarism, economic globalization, and impacts on local and migrant women in South Korea who live and work around US military bases.

In 1978, Okazawa-Rey co-authored “A Black Feminist Statement” with the collective.

In 1990, she joined the Advisory board for the Shanti Project in San Francisco along with the board of directors for the Afro-Asian Relations Council of Washington.

In 1994, Okazawa-Rey received a Fulbright Program in South Korea, citing an interest in interminority racism between Korean and African Americans. Given the high tension in the U.S. between Korean immigrant merchants and the African American community, such as the Los Angeles race riots, she planned to research what Korean locals were learning about African Americans living internationally. During her time in South Korea, she noted the U.S. military presence along with the generational impact of the Japanese colonization of Korea from 1910 to 1945. She made a connection between the U.S. military to race and gender relations both abroad and domestically. Okazawa-Rey began and spent much of her career exploring both this and the interconnections between militarism, globalization of the economy, and military violence against women and girls.

In 1997, she was one of 40 women who cofounded the East Asia-U.S.-Puerto Rico Women's Network Against U.S. Militarism, which became the International Women's Network Against Militarism.

She has a long-standing relationship to international social justice work as she sits on the international board of NGOs: PeaceWomen Across the Globe (based in Bern, Switzerland), Du Re Bang (My Sister's Place, Uijongbu, South Korea), and AWID (Association for Women's Rights in Development) after having worked for three years as the Feminist Research Consultant at the Women's Centre for Legal Aid and Counselling in Ramallah, Palestine.

Okazawa-Rey also took part in co-principal investigations with Amina Mama, Rose Mensah-Kutin, and other women over the militarized and post-conflict areas of Sierra Leone, Liberia, Ghana, and Nigeria, where they explored the role of feminist research in activism, policy change, and women's empowerment. A related interest was connecting the effects of the military-industrial complex and prison industrial complex have on poor and working-class youth in American communities of color. She is, making connections—both theoretical and practical—between foreign policy and domestic policy.

She has spoken at Yale University, with students and alumni of Brown University, and many other universities and community venues to share the knowledge she has learned through her activism, research, and life experiences.

== Personal life ==
Okazawa-Rey was one of the 100+ Black scholars and academics who opined their support for Bernie Sanders during the 2020 Democratic Party presidential primaries.

== Publications ==
She is the author of numerous publications, including:

- “Making Connections: Building the East Asia-US Women's Network” Gwyn Kirk and Margo Okazawa-Rey, 1998. In Women and War Reader, Jennifer Turpin and Lois A. Lorentsen (eds). New York: New York University Press. pp. 308–322.
- “Children of GI Town: The invisible legacy of militarized prostitution” Margo Okazawa-Rey, 1997. Asian Journal of Women's Studies, Spring: pp. 71–100.
- Women's Lives: Multicultural Perspectives. (6th Ed.) Gwyn Kirk and Margo Okazawa-Rey, 2016. New York: McGraw-Hill.
- Activist scholarship: antiracism, feminism, and social change. Julia Sudbury and Margo Okazawa-Rey, 2009. Boulder: Paradigm Publishers.
- "Militarism, Conflict, and Women's Activism in the Global Era: Challenges and Prospects for Women in Three West African Contexts" Amina Mama and Margo Okazawa-Rey. Feminist Review (vol. 101:1), July 2012. pp. 97–123
- Beyond Heroes and Holidays: A Practical Guide to K-12 Multicultural, Anti-Racist Education and Staff Development. Lee, E., Menkart, D., & Okazawa-Rey, M. (Eds.). 2011.
- “No Freedom without Connections: Envisioning Sustainable Feminist Solidarities.” (2018) in Feminist Freedom Warriors: Genealogies, Justice, Politics, and Hope, Chandra Talpade Mohanty and Linda Carty (eds.). New York: Haymarket Press.
- Between a Rock and Hard Place: Southeast Asian Women Confront Extractivism, Militarism, and Religious Fundamentalisms (2018). Washington DC: Just Associates.
- “Liberal Arts Colleges Partnering with Highlander Research and Education Center: Intergenerational Learning for Student Campus Activism and Personal Transformation,” Feminist Formations Special Issue on Feminist Social Justice Pedagogy (2018).
- Gendered Lives: Intersectional Perspectives (7th Edition). Gwyn Kirk and Margo Okazawa-Rey, 2020. Oxford UK/New York: Oxford University Press.
- “Nation-izing” Coalition and Solidarity Politics for US Anti-militarist Feminists, Social Justice (2020).

== Awards and nominations ==
- Fulbright Senior Research Fellowship in 1994.
- Social Science Research Council Grant in 1996.
- Jane Watson Irwin Distinguished Chair in Women's Studies at Hamilton College, from 1999 to 2001.
- Feminist Activist Scholar in Residence at Scripps College in 2006.
- Distinguished Fellow in Research Justice at Mills College from 2013-2014
- Barbara Lee Distinguished Chair in Women's Leadership at Mills College from 2008-2009 and 2018-2019
- Received Lasting Legacy Award at the Words of Fire Conference held April 29th and 30th at Spelman College in 2017
