= National Association of Wage Earners =

American organisation

- Abbreviation: N.A .of W.E.
- Formation: 1921; 105 years ago
- Defunct: c.1926; 100 years ago
- Headquarters: 1115 Rhode Island Ave., N.W., Washington, D.C.
- President: Nannie H. Burroughs
- Vice President: Mary McLeod Bethune

The National Association of Wage Earners was an organisation which sought to standardize and improve living conditions for women, particularly migrant workers. The organisation operated a mail-order clothes factory, and was headquartered in Washington D.C. It was founded by Nannie H. Burroughs, who had previously founded a national training school for black girls in 1909. The Association appears to have become defunct by 1926.
