= Barbara Smith =

American activist and academic (born 1946)

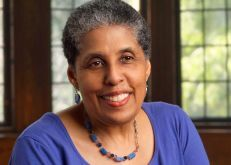
- Smith in 2015
- Born: November 16, 1946 (age 79); Cleveland, Ohio, U.S.
- Education: Mount Holyoke College (BA); University of Pittsburgh (MA)
- Occupations: Scholar; writer; activist
- Relatives: Beverly Smith (sister)
- Writing career
- Movement: Black feminism

Barbara Smith (born November 16, 1946) (Note: Smith's birthdate has been mistakenly reported as in December. She confirmed that it is in November.) is an American lesbian feminist and socialist who has played a significant role in Black feminism in the United States. Since the early 1970s, she has been active as a scholar, activist, critic, lecturer, author, and publisher of Black feminist thought. She has also taught at numerous colleges and universities for 25 years. Smith's essays, reviews, articles, short stories and literary criticism have appeared in a range of publications, including The New York Times Book Review, The Black Scholar, Ms., Gay Community News, The Guardian, The Village Voice, Conditions and The Nation. She has a twin sister, Beverly Smith, who is also a lesbian feminist activist and writer.

== Early life ==
=== Childhood ===
Barbara Smith and her fraternal twin sister, Beverly, were born on November 16, 1946, in Cleveland, Ohio, to Hilda Beall Smith. Born prematurely, both twins struggled during their first months of life, though Beverly particularly struggled after contracting pneumonia. Their mother worked as a nurse's aide and later a store clerk, so the girls’ grandmother acted as their primary caretaker during their childhood, while their mother drew an income. In 1956, when Barbara and Beverly were nine, their mother died from heart complications related to childhood rheumatic fever. After their mother's death, the girls continued to live in a two-family home with their grandmother, aunts, uncles, and cousins.

Although the Smith family was of relatively little means, her grandmother, aunts, and mother were all well-educated, especially for the level of education accessible to Black women in the 1940s and 1950s. Her grandmother and great-aunts taught in segregated schools in the South before moving north, though her mother was the only one in her family to have received a college diploma, a Bachelor's of Science in education from Fort Valley State University (then Fort Valley State College). Barbara's family were all active readers who emphasized education, inside and outside of school.

For most of her life, Barbara had little knowledge of her father, Gartrell Smith, who split with Hilda before the twins were born. According to Barbara's mother's cousin, “Aunt” Isabel, Hilda and Gartrell eloped after Hilda's parents disapproved of the match. Hilda returned to Cleveland pregnant after her split with Gartrell. Barbara never met her father or saw pictures of him. Little is known of him other than that he was a member of the military during World War II and that Hilda and Gartrell met in Georgia, where Hilda attended college.

Although Barbara and her sister grew up in the northern United States, her family retained its southern roots and traditions from rural Georgia. Her mother's family was one of the millions of African-American families that participated in the Great Migration in the first half of the 20th century to escape the South's oppressive racial caste system and improve their economic circumstances. Barbara describes her identity as that of a southern woman and credits her family's experience with intense racial trauma in Georgia as a catalyst for her activism. At the same time, she does not exonerate the north from intense racial discrimination, documenting several formative incidents of anti-Blackness that she and her sister experienced. During one such incident, she and her sister brought homemade cookies to their summer French class, which was taught by an unabashedly racist woman. None of the white children in the class ate any of the cookies. Despite obvious racial discrimination, however, both Barbara and Beverly excelled academically.

=== Education ===
Barbara Smith and her sister began their elementary education at Bolton Elementary School and moved to Robert Fulton Elementary School during 1st grade. Smith partially credits her early academic success to the high quality of the public schools she attended. Although she and her sister were selected for a special school for the academically talented in fourth grade, their family decided not to switch the girls' school so soon after their mother's death. Barbara and Beverly attended Alexander Hamilton Jr. High School and later John Adams High School.

In high school, Smith excelled in honors and AP classes and scored very high on the PSAT. Her grades and test scores gained her entrance to Mount Holyoke College in 1965, but, fatigued by racial animosity at the college, she transferred to the New School for Social Research in New York City, where she studied social sciences for a year. She returned to Mount Holyoke for her senior year and graduated in 1969.

After graduating from Mount Holyoke College in 1969, Smith pursued an MA in literature at the University of Pittsburgh and graduated in 1971. In Pittsburgh she began to become active in the Women's movement and the Gay Liberation movement.

In 1981, Smith completed all but the dissertation for her doctoral studies at the University of Connecticut. By that time, she was an activist for Black, feminist, and gay issues.

In 2015, the University at Albany awarded Smith an honorary doctorate degree.

=== Early activism ===
Because she grew up in a deeply segregated society, Smith developed a political consciousness from a young age. As high school students, she and her sister participated in civil rights protests that centered on school desegregation. During this time, Smith was a volunteer for the Cleveland chapter of the Congress of Racial Equality (CORE). She describes the murder of Bruce Klunder, an activist and minister, as a catalytic force behind her involvement with the Cleveland movement. She attended several speeches by Martin Luther King Jr., and met civil rights activist Fannie Lou Hamer.

In 1965, Smith matriculated at Mount Holyoke College, where she was one of the few Black students. She quickly became involved with the Civil Actions Group, which, among other issues, was involved in organizing against the Vietnam War. Although Mount Holyoke did not have a Students for Democratic Society (SDS) chapter on campus, Smith and other Mount Holyoke students admired and imitated the group's efforts. During her year at the New School for Social Research, Smith traveled to Chicago and participated in the protests accompanying the Democratic National Convention.

After graduating from Mount Holyoke, Smith took a break from front-line activism, where she felt constrained by her identity as a woman in the Black nationalist movement. For a time, she reasoned that she could help advance racial justice by working within the academy. But after attending a meeting of the National Black Feminist Organization (NBFO), she reentered the sphere of activism and began collaborating with many notable women of color.

Smith settled in Boston after receiving an MA in literature from the University of Pittsburgh. Her sister Beverly's staff position at Ms. Magazine allowed Beverly to obtain critical contacts, and through the publication, Barbara met Margaret Sloan, a founder of the NBFO. Intrigued by the call for attendance to the NBFO's Eastern Regional Conference in 1974, Smith caucused with women from the Boston area and made contacts in order to establish a Boston NBFO chapter.

In 1975, with Beverly and Demita Frazier, a Chicago activist, Smith established a Boston NBFO chapter. Due to lack of direction from the national organization, the Boston chapter had an independent nature, deciding as a group to focus on consciousness-raising and grassroots organizing that assisted Boston's poor and working classes.

== Activism ==
=== Combahee River Collective ===
Frustrated by the lack of communication from the national organization, but also realizing that the Boston chapter's politics were significantly more radical than the NBFO's, the group decided to split off entirely. Named after a successful military operation Harriet Tubman led during the Civil War at a river in South Carolina, the Combahee River Collective moved quickly to write a manifesto. The Combahee River Collective Statement outlines the group's objectives, but also identifies it as a class-conscious, sexuality-affirming Black feminist organization. Recognizing lesbianism as a legitimate identity reinforced the debate within Black feminism and the larger women's movement.

As a socialist Black feminist organization, the collective emphasized the intersections of racial, gender, heterosexist, and class oppression in the lives of African Americans and other women of color. Like other Black feminist organizations at the time, Combahee articulated "many of the concerns specific to Black women, from anger with Black men for dating and marrying white women, to internal conflict over skin color, hair texture, and facial features, to the differences between the mobility of white and Black women...also attacking the myth of Black matriarch and stereotypical portrayals of Black women in popular culture." The collective also worked on issues such as "reproductive rights, rape, prison reform, sterilization abuse, violence against women, health care, and racism within the white women's movement." It was deliberately structured to avoid hierarchy and give members a sense of equality; Smith cited this structure as essential to ensuring that Black feminism survived "as a radical movement." Combahee members organized retreats to discuss issues within the Statement, ways to incorporate Black feminism into Black women's consciousness, and pressing issues in their own communities. But the organization lost momentum as conversations about lesbianism and educational advancement alienated some members. As a result of leadership conflict and interpersonal disputes, Combahee's membership declined. The last meeting was in February 1980.

=== Kitchen Table: Women of Color Press ===
An enthusiast of American literature and writing, Smith pursued English study throughout her education. After being enthralled by James Baldwin's novel Go Tell It on the Mountain she resolved to become an expatriate writer, but due to her interest in social movements in the 1960s, she resigned herself to literature studies at home. She pursued graduate study in literature in an attempt to seek out female writers of color, but came to terms with the fact that the American literary canon did not include Black women. After reading in a Ms. article that Alice Walker would be teaching a course on African-American women writers, Smith enrolled and vowed to teach female writers of color whenever she taught. She began doing so at Emerson College in 1973.

Smith was a leader in the women in print movement, which attempted to establish alternative communications networks of feminist publications, presses, and bookstores created by and for women. Many feminist presses in the 1970s consisted primarily of white middle-class women with an intended audience of other white middle-class women. After conversations with her friend Audre Lorde, Smith founded Kitchen Table: Women of Color Press in 1980. Unlike other separatist feminist publishers, Smith intended Kitchen Table's audience to be all people of color, including men.

Originally established in Boston, Kitchen Table relocated to New York in 1981. In collaboration with Lorde, Cherríe Moraga, Hattie Gossett, Susan L. Yung, June Jordan, and Gloria Anzaldúa, Smith published several pamphlets and books that came to be embraced in ethnic studies, women's studies, queer studies, and Black studies programs, such as Home Girls: A Black Feminist Anthology, This Bridge Called My Back, Cuentos: Stories by Latinas, and I Am Your Sister: Black Women Organizing Across Sexualities. Smith has said that Kitchen Table's legacy lies in contemporary publishing, as women of color writers such as Walker and Toni Morrison have entered the American literary canon, as well as influencing feminist studies to incorporate intersectionality as a lens of inquiry.

Smith continued to write and produced a collection of her essays, articles, and reviews after her involvement in Kitchen Table ended. Her article "Toward a Black Feminist Criticism" (1977), first published in Conditions magazine, is cited as "the first explicit statement of black feminist criticism", as "pivotal", and as "groundbreaking", Smith has edited three major collections about Black women: Conditions 5: The Black Women's Issue (1979, with Lorraine Bethel); All the Women Are White, All the Blacks Are Men, But Some of Us Are Brave: Black Women's Studies (1982, with Gloria T. Hull and Patricia Bell-Scott); and Home Girls: A Black Feminist Anthology (first edition, Kitchen Table: Women of Color Press, 1983; second edition, Rutgers University Press, 2000). Smith has since collected her various writings in the anthology The Truth That Never Hurts: Writings on Race, Gender, and Freedom (1998).

=== Feminism ===
Smith was the first scholar to coin the term "identity politics", which she used to describe how intersecting aspects of identity, such as race, gender, and sexuality, create unique forms of oppression for women of color, especially Black lesbian women. She argued that feminist movements must recognize the complex identities of marginalized women to be truly inclusive. Smith was critical of second-wave feminism for often neglecting and sometimes intentionally excluding Black women's experiences. She claimed that if feminism did not include all women it was not feminism so much as "female self-aggrandizement".

In conjunction with her work on identity politics, Smith created Black feminist criticism. In her groundbreaking piece "Toward a Black Feminist Criticism," Smith identifies the rich literary tradition of Afro-descended women in America, asserting that Black female authors have been ignored in literary history. When they have not been overtly ignored, they have been devalued and stripped of political and feminist meaning. Because there was no political movement for Black feminism, Black women's work was relegated to African-American literature and stripped of an analysis of sex or gender, meaning that all the works that defined "feminism" at that time related it only to white women's experience. Along with providing a theoretical framework by which to evaluate literature by Black women, Smith was also perhaps the most influential force in popularizing authors like Alice Walker, Toni Morrison, Amy Tan, and other female authors of color through her "Kitchen Table: Women of Color Press".

As a lesbian, Smith's intersectional approach to feminism extended beyond race and gender into sexuality. She was the first scholar to identify a Black lesbian feminist body of literature, although she separated lesbianism from a political identity. During the 1970s, 1980s, and 1990s, Smith was active in LGBT rights movements, but became disillusioned by the movement's lack of complexity, which she felt revolved around single issues like gay marriage and "celebrity culture." Mainstream LGBT movements centered the experience of gay white people while ignoring the compounded oppression faced by gay people of color. Since then, Smith has preferred multi-issue LGBT activism that addresses the oppression faced those who are most marginalized in society.

== Later life ==
=== Public office ===
Continuing her work as a community organizer, Smith was elected to the Albany, New York Common Council (city council) in 2005, representing Ward 4, and reelected in 2009. She also worked during this period with David Kaczynski at New Yorkers for Alternatives to the Death Penalty on innovative solutions to violent crime. During her two terms on the Albany Common Council, Smith was active on issues of youth development, violence prevention, and educational opportunities for poor, minority and underserved persons.

=== Accomplishments ===
- She donated her papers to the Lesbian Herstory Archives in Brooklyn, New York, and gave oral histories of her life to Columbia University and Smith College. She appeared in Marlon Riggs's 1994 documentary Black Is...Black Ain't and the 2013 PBS and AOL documentary Makers: Women Who Make America. On February 2, 2017, she made a speech at Claiming Williams, "an annual event where the campus community comes together to discuss issues of race, gender, identity, religion and community". Claiming Williams is "moral courage day" at Williams College. Smith said that "taking the high ground, being honest, and deciding to do something that is objectively frightening" are key components of moral courage.
- Smith was a Fellow at Radcliffe College's Bunting Institute in 1996 and received a 1994 Stonewall Award for her activism. She received the Church Women United's Human Rights Award in 2000 and was nominated for a Nobel Peace Prize in 2005.
- In 2014, SUNY Press published Ain't Gonna Let Nobody Turn Me Around: Forty Years of Movement Building with Barbara Smith, with a foreword by Robin D. G. Kelley.
- On November 14, 2015, the Albany Public Library Foundation awarded Smith the title "LITERARY LEGEND", along with Albany native Gregory Maguire (author of Wicked: The Life and Times of the Wicked Witch of the West).
- Smith is an activist against Islamophobia. She established a website, "Stop Islamophobia", to demonstrate support for immigrants and refugees. She created a "United States of All" decal and coordinated marches in November and December 2016.
- Season 6, episode 3 of the podcast Making Gay History, released in 2019, was about Smith.
- In February 2020, Smith endorsed Bernie Sanders for president in the Democratic Party primaries.
- In June 2020, in honor of the 50th anniversary of the first LGBTQ Pride parade, Queerty named her among the 50 heroes “leading the nation toward equality, acceptance, and dignity for all people”.

=== Awards and recognition ===
- African American Policy Forum Harriet Tubman Lifetime Achievement Award (2017)
- Lambda Literary Award: Publishing Professional Award
- Alumnae Association of Mount Holyoke College Achievement Award
- Mount Holyoke College Alumnae Association Sesquicentennial Award
- Nomination for Nobel Peace Prize (2005)
- Fellow at the Bunting Institute of Radcliffe College
- Scholar-in-residence at the Schomburg Center for Research in Black Culture (1995–1996)
- Church Women United's Human Rights Award (2000)
- Stonewall Award for Service to the Lesbian and Gay Community (1994)
- The David R Kessler Award for Lesbian & Gay Studies: CLAGS: The Center for LGBTQ Studies(1994)

=== Smith Caring Circle ===
As someone has committed to a "lifetime of work and struggle", Smith does not have access to traditional retirement fund. Following in the collective care of a Black feminist ethos, there is a Caring Circle that supports Smith and her work. Contributions can be made monthly.

== Selected bibliography ==
- Bethel, Lorraine, and Barbara Smith (eds). Conditions: Five, The Black Women's Issue 2, no. 2 (Autumn 1979).
- Bulkin, Elly, Minnie Bruce Pratt, and Barbara Smith. Yours in Struggle: Three Feminist Perspectives on Anti-Semitism and Racism. Ithaca, N.Y.: Firebrand Books, 1984, 1988.
- Hull, Gloria T., Patricia Bell Scott, and Barbara Smith (eds). All the Women Are White, All the Blacks Are Men, But Some of Us Are Brave: Black Women's Studies. New York: The Feminist Press at The City University of New York, 1982.
- Jones, Alethia and Virginia Eubanks, editors. With Barbara Smith. Ain't Gonna Let Nobody Turn Me Around: Forty Years of Movement Building with Barbara Smith. Foreword by Robin D. G. Kelley. SUNY Press, 2014.
- Mankiller, Wilma, Gwendolyn Mink, Marysa Navarro, Barbara Smith, and Gloria Steinem (eds). The Reader's Companion to U.S. Women's History. Boston and New York: Houghton Mifflin, 1998.
- Moraga, Cherrie and Smith, Barbara. "Lesbian Literature: A Third World Feminist Perspective" in Margaret Cruikshank, editor, Lesbian Studies: Present and Future. Old Westbury, N.Y.: Feminist Press, 1982
- Smith, Barbara (October 1977). "Toward A Black Feminist Literary Criticism". Conditions. 1 (2): 25–44. Republished, "Towards a Black Feminist Criticism". The Radical Teacher. 7: 20–27. 1978.
- Smith, Barbara, and Beverly Smith. "Across the Kitchen Table: A Sister-to-Sister Dialogue." In Cherríe Moraga and Gloria Anzaldúa (eds), This Bridge Called My Back: Writings by Radical Women of Color. Watertown, Massachusetts: Persephone Press, 1981
- Smith, Barbara. "’Feisty Characters’ and ‘Other People's Causes’: Memories of White Racism and U.S. Feminism." In Rachel Blau DuPlessis and Ann Snitow, eds, The Feminist Memoir Project: Voices from Women's Liberation. New York: Crown Publishing, 1998.
- Smith, Barbara, ed. Home Girls: A Black Feminist Anthology. New York: Kitchen Table: Women of Color Press, 1983.
- Smith, Barbara. Writings on Race, Gender, and Freedom: The Truth that Never Hurts. New Jersey: Rutgers University Press, 1998.
- Smith, Barbara. "Where Has Gay Liberation Gone? An Interview with Barbara Smith." In Amy Gluckman and Betsy Reed (eds), Homo Economics: Capitalism, Community, and Lesbian and Gay Life. New York and London: Routledge, 1997.

== See also ==
- Black feminism
- Lesbian feminism
- Womanism
- Critical race theory
- Combahee River Collective
- Kitchen Table: Women of Color Press
- Intersectionality
- Identity politics
- Demita Frazier
