= Red Jordan Arobateau =

American writer and artist (1943–2021)

Holy Communion, Self Portrait II: 2008, acrylic on canvas, 40 × 50 cm; Arobateau's expressionist self-portrait features symbolic motifs of spirituality, religion, social issues and pets – components typical of his paintings.

Red Jordan Arobateau (November 15, 1943 – November 25, 2021) was an American author, playwright, poet and painter. Largely self-publishing over 80 literary works—often with autofictional elements—Arobateau was one of the most prolific writers of street lit, and a proponent of transgender and lesbian erotica.

Born and raised in Chicago, Arobateau moved to San Francisco in adulthood because of its LGBTQ+ friendly culture, where he transitioned and began living as a trans man. Most indie and LGBTQ+ publishing houses rejected his manuscripts. Arobateau worked odd jobs to finance his self-publications, and sold hand-stapled books in lesbian bars, feminist bookstores and on the streets. He spent most of his adult life in poverty. Arobateau appeared in documentaries such as Before Stonewall (1984) and his writings were intermittently published in anthologies like Daughters of Africa (1992).

Arobateau's prose contained themes of butch lesbians, transsexuality, streetlife, philosophy, social issues and social justice, and his poetry was spiritual and religious. Critical reception was mixed; his progressive characters and realist storylines received praise, while criticism was directed at his unrefined writing style. The life and works of Arobateau have been analyzed in various areas of social research, including sociology of literature, transgender studies, feminist theory, identity and black studies. An early figure in the history and development of street lit, Arobateau inspired writers Ann Allen Shockley and Michelle Tea.

== Life ==
Red Jordan Arobateau was born on November 15, 1943, in Chicago. He was the only child of a Christian Honduran immigrant father and a mother of African American descent. He was raised as a female. Arobateau started writing when he was 13 to escape a turbulent home life; his mother was abusive towards him. When he was 15, he read a pulp magazine that had a brief mention of a lesbian character – feeling seen for the first time, he began to identify as a butch lesbian. Arobateau spent time on the streets, in queer areas and dive bars, and developed alcoholism in adolescence. His parents divorced when he was 17 and he moved with his father. Arobateau enrolled in a college but left after a year, stating that it was too much a "social affair".

Arobateau's name was based on his given surname with an "A" added to the original form, "Robateau". He took "Jordan" from his grandmother's last name for its religious connotations and relations to his African-American heritage. After his hair was dyed red, he conceived that the color represented "his attention to passion and eroticism as a writer"; thus he adopted "Red" as his first name. Citing persecutory policies of then-mayor Richard J. Daley, Arobateau decided to move out of Chicago. He shifted to New York City before moving to San Francisco in 1967—where he spent the rest of his life—largely because of its LGBTQ+ friendly culture.

In 1969, Arobateau helped establish Gay Women's Liberation, an organization dedicated to lesbian feminist activism. He taught self-defense and karate to its members. Formerly an atheist, Arobateau became a Christian and joined the Metropolitan Community Church after the death of his father in 1973. He operated a storefront church where he would preach the gospel. His conversion alienated some of his friends who were concerned about the social and political implications of a rise in Christian fundamentalism across the country. Arobateau used drugs until his hospitalization, after which he had become clean.

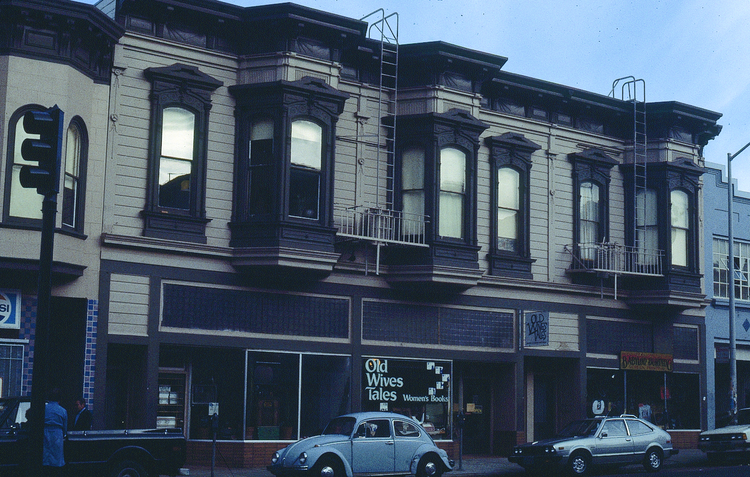
Old Wives' Tales, a feminist bookstore in Mission Dolores, San Francisco, sold Arobateau's books.

Arobateau began self-publishing in the 1970s, with The Bars Across Heaven (1975) being his first novel. He worked different jobs to fund each publication, and had experience working as an office assistant, factory worker, karate teacher, nurse's aide, cashier and cook. Arobateau could write a novel in a month; he would then make photocopies and staple the manuscript together with a book cover. Relying on the grapevine, Arobateau sold his works in off the record lesbian channels, and limited physical distribution of his copies to lesbian bars, feminist bookstores and the streets.

Prior to the publication of his short story "Suzie Q" in poet Judy Grahn's anthology True to Life Adventure Stories (1978), every indie and LGBTQ+ publisher Arobateau approached had refused to publish his work. Arobateau attributed those refusals to the prominence of sexual content in his works, which he claimed was relatively unacceptable even for feminist and LGBTQ+ publishers of the time. His writings were occasionally published through publications like On Our Backs, although he remained mostly self-published throughout his life. By and large, Arobateau lived his adult life in poverty and on unemployment benefits.

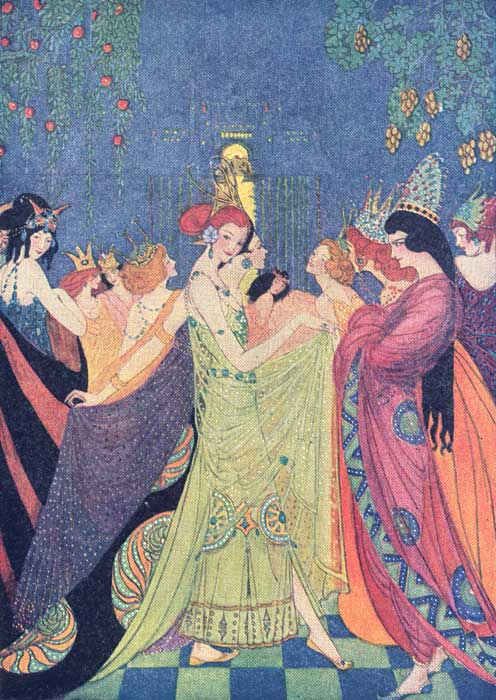
In Arobateau's revised folklore, the princesses would escape to fulfil their lesbian sexual desires (pictured Elenore Abbott's 1920 illustration)

In 1984, Arobateau appeared in Greta Schiller's Before Stonewall, where they discussed his life and challenges before the Stonewall riots of 1969. He went on an 11-year hiatus before authoring Lucy & Mickey in the 1990s. Around that time, Arobateau transitioned his gender, underwent a sex reassignment surgery and began to identify as a trans man. Arobateau's "Nobody's People"—an essay about social alienation felt by people of mixed-race heritage, including himself—was a part of Daughters of Africa (1992), edited by Margaret Busby. Arobateau wrote an erotic lesbian retelling of "The Shoes That Were Danced to Pieces" for Michael Thomas Ford's Once Upon a Time: Erotic Fairy Tales for Women in 1996.

Excerpts from his books have been a part of several anthologies, including Cum With Me Lucy in Off the Rag (1996) by Lee Lynch and Akia Woods, Lay Lady Lay in Best Lesbian Erotica 1997 by Jewelle Gomez and Tristan Taormino, and The Nearness Of You/Sorrow Of The Madonna in Hot & Bothered (1998) by Karen X. Tulchinsky. Arobateau experienced homelessness "for a while" until moving in with his then-wife in Oakland. After getting divorced in 2003, he shifted back to San Francisco. Arobateau's books were not circulated in Canada until at least 2004 due to tight pornography laws in the country that bar the entry of "obscene material".

In 2007, Arobateau appeared in Martin Rawlings-Fein's Clocked: An Oral History, where he gave personal anecdotes in context of the history of the transgender rights movement. By that year, he had published 80 novels, plays, collection of short stories and poetry. Tom Waddell Health Center in Tenderloin, San Francisco was the first primary care clinic in the US to offer transgender health care services; Arobateau was one of 12 patients to feature in its 2012 documentary, Transgender Tuesdays: A Clinic in the Tenderloin by Mark Freeman and Nathaniel Walters. He also presented the film at the 2012 Transgender Summit.

As of 2013, Arobateau had painted 60 paintings. He was a part of FTM International, and lived with his partner Dalila Jasmin, a belly dancer who often danced at Arobateau's book readings. In 2019, Arobateau became the first person to move into Marcy Adelman and Jeanette Gurevitch Community on 95 Laguna, an LGBTQ+ friendly senior housing by Openhouse and Mercy Housing. He died on November 25, 2021, in San Francisco, aged 78; his memorial service was conducted at Grace Cathedral on March 27, 2022.

== Themes ==
History books tell us a lot about the lives of upper-class women such as Gertie Stein and Alice B. but very little of the underprivileged lesbian factory workers, queer servants, and tranny seamstresses. There's a whole group of dikes to whom these characters, these books may appeal.

— Red Jordan Arobateau
The Lesbian Review of Books, 1996.

Arobateau often depicted his experiences and those of people in his life through autofiction, and his prose focused on themes of butch and femme lesbians, transgender people, transsexuality and sex work. Arobateau wrote about "sexual activities of a human being in any given day to the same extent [he described] their other aspects", hence a significant portion of his writings explored sexuality and sexual activities of their characters.

Arobateau's stories were set on the streets, in ghettos and poverty. They portrayed realities of those lives, which differed from works of other black lesbian writers of the time who generally wrote idealistic fiction and academic non-fiction. Arobateau largely wrote his characters to communicate with themselves, and he frequently switched between first- and third-person narrators; the third-person narrator—represented in the text by sentimental and sympathetic positions—was sometimes himself, and it advocated for a rise in emotional intensity, such as through behavior known to be risky. In his works, drug use was used as a means to cope as well as a device to amplify various sensations and perceptions.

Based on Arobateau's personal experiences, struggles of a mixed-racial identity often formed the basis of his various fictional stories. Arobateau's content reflected the social isolation he endured because of growing up "poor, black, and gay", and how he developed maladaptive coping mechanisms as a result. His characters challenged heteronormative constructs of the society, and his storylines portrayed the disfranchisement and social marginalization of non-heteronormative characters. Motifs of contemporary social justice topics such as black feminism, women's liberation movement and different LGBTQ+ movements would sometimes serve as backdrops for his plots. His works conveyed criticism of capitalism, opposition of Western embodiment and historical revisionism of transgender history that is more understanding of gender dysphoria; he used aesthetics to represent alternative forms of embodiment.

Arobateau's storylines explored themes of metaphysics and alchemy. His prose presented the process of gender transitioning to be inseparable from spiritual practice. He also relied on spirituality—as opposed to objective truth—as an explanation for his characters' being. The focus of his poetry was largely on his spiritual beliefs. After Arobateau's conversion, it increasingly incorporated Christian themes, which was particularly evident in his call and response poems. In contrast, his prose depicted the intersection of religion with science as detrimental, especially in the relation to transgender medicine.

The Pig: 1969, oil on canvas, 63 × 48 cm; the social painting depicts an anthropoid squeezing blood from money, symbolizing capitalist exploitation of labor.

Arobateau painted in a contemporary and expressionist style, incorporating symbolic and surreal imagery into his works. He painted portraits and animals, and on subjects of spirituality and religion. Arobateau practiced social artistry through paintings, such as portraying exploitation of labor in The Pig (1969). Arobateau often used "pig" metaphorically as a derogatory term in his prose to refer to things such as a self-critical internal monologue and internalization of external pressures. Stacey Cherie Moultry interpreted The Pig in relation to Arobateau's literary "pig", and said that the painting portrays "a seemingly congenial persona who works into one's good graces long enough to gain trust before administering unconstructive criticism."

== Reception ==
In 1982, writer Ann Allen Shockley wrote one of the earliest reviews of Arobateau's writing. She briefly reviewed several of his works and provided a collection of his biographical details for a Sinister Wisdom article. In her review of "Suzie Q", Shockley wrote that it "brought a new protagonist to black lesbian fiction, springing to life the black lesbian street woman in all her hard glaring reality." Shockley further praised the storyline for its progressive portrayal of black prostitutes "in the personalized role of being human", that she said were otherwise cast in mainstream "as a piece of meat to be exploited in pornography"; writing for the Gay Community News, Andrea Loewenstein said that "Suzie Q" does so with "a rare combination of respect, sympathy, and realism."

LaMonda Horton-Stallings wrote in a CR: The New Centennial Review article that Arobateau and Iceberg Slim had mastered "the skill of transgressing gender and sexuality". Reviewing Lucy & Mickey, Heather Findlay summarized that the novel was "deeply philosophical and powerfully erotic", and Lillian Faderman remarked that Arobateau was "the Thomas Wolfe of lesbian literature". For a Maximum Rocknroll article, Vince Larussa described Autumn Changes—considering it a representative of Arobateau's œuvre—as "figuratively an unorthodox fairytale, philosophically a manifesto, and literally, 'a testimony of his first transition years intermixed with remembrances of things past.'" Randy Turoff characterized Dirty Pictures as "engaging, passionate, and emotionally moving". He praised its depiction of sexual longing, betrayal and the power dynamics involved in race and class issues.

Arobateau was self-critical of his writing, saying that he was aware that he "needs an editor to help refine [his] work". In an article of The Lesbian Review of Books, Stephanie Byrd was critical of his unfiltered writing style—in particular, of his poetry—and stated that he "struggles to put [his] 'vision' on paper". Byrd said of Laughter Of The Witch that "the metamorphoses that Arobateau chronicles in these poems is not easily accessed due to an overabundance of metaphor and imagery". Discussing the readability of The Bars Across Heaven, Loewenstein said that its unconventional dialogue "works amazingly well within the context of the novel", but added that his writing style makes it apparent that Arobateau "did not attend the school where many of us learned 'how to write'". In her 2005 book Funk the Erotic, Horton-Stallings criticized Arobateau's prose for its poor quality. However, she emphasized the novelty of his transgender and transsexual characters, elaborating that "their intersection, or lack thereof, with a more mainstream transgender movement should also garner some attention for the novels' historical importance, if not for their literary merits."

Nisa Donnelly defended Arobateau and said that his "raucous and raw and rough-hewn" writing was reflective of the qualities of his characters and storylines. Lynch assessed Arobateau's writing as "iconoclastic and idiosyncratic" in his 1995 review of contemporary LGBTQ+ literature for Lambda Book Report. He further opined that Arobateau "is the graffiti artist of lesbian literature, not respectable by a long shot, but chronicling for us the raw material of [his] world". Noting difficulties Arobateau faced in getting his books published "as an erotic writer of street-class butch life", Thyme S. Siegel commended him for continuing to write and self-publish works in his unique style.

== Research ==
Rather than focus on Arobateau's fiction about transsubjects alone, it seems more useful to explicate how the author sustained and supported the fifty-year journey from woman to man through a writing life in which transworld identity was housed in a ghetto heaven important for black transfutures beyond necropolitics.

— LaMonda Horton-Stallings
Funk the Erotic, 2015.

Analyzing semantic shift of the word "cum" in a Sexuality & Culture article, Sara Johnsdotter traced the first mention of "female cum" to Arobateau's Hobo Sex (1991). Ute Rupp's (University of California, Berkeley, 2001) comparative literature doctorate discussed that writings of Daniel Paul Schreber, Djuna Barnes, Kathy Acker and Arobateau offer an unconventional reading of the Symbolic in the Name of the Father, which in turn develops "new types of subjects, laws, reals, imaginaries, and similar psycho-somatic fictions" within Lacanian frameworks.

Horton-Stallings credits the work of Arobateau and Toni Newman for constructing a transgender theory of subjectivity which considers factors of "race, culture, and pleasure" – factors she said were overlooked by contemporary models. In a literature review published in American Quarterly, Mecca Jamilah Sullivan indicated that the content and themes of Arobateau and Newman demonstrate how sexual practice is a vital component of the concept of self, and that it provides "narrative alternatives" to transmedicalism. Julie R. Enszer discussed the issue of lesbian erasure within the transgender community in Journal of Lesbian Studies, citing experiences and works of Arobateau, among others.

Holly Ann Larson's doctoral dissertation (Florida Atlantic University, 2003) was a feminist standpoint epistemological discourse on how financially weak women and individuals like Arobateau tackle structural gender biases. Larson concluded that those experiences led to development of knowledge of resistance unique to them, and that individuals like Arobateau attempted to reclaim agency by exerting sexual capital in their writings. In her doctoral dissertation, Naomi Extra (Rutgers University, 2021) explored a more inclusive understanding of sex-positive feminism and the early sex-positive movement; noting that development and early history of those movements mainly credited works of white women, Extra advocated for literary recognition of writings of black writers Arobateau, SDiane Bogus and Shockley and their contributions. The dissertation also presented their work as a literary aspect of black feminism and medium for expression of sexuality by black women – areas that have been insufficiently researched according to her.

American studies doctorate of Moultry (University of Iowa, 2019) focused on influences a mixed-race identity had on writers and artists of 1960–89, and how they reconciled their racial hybridity when the one-drop rule (legal and social practice of classifying individuals under only one race) was still in effect. Moultry categorized Arobateau's expression of hybridity as liminal (or ambiguous), and said that Arobateau "actively resists normativizing protocols" by not adhering to cultural stereotypes of the time. For her Doctor of Psychology, Lauren Nicole Logan (Alliant International University, 2010) conducted a psychological research into minority stress coping mechanisms of masculine African-American lesbians, especially people like Arobateau who identify as multiple minorities; Logan found that Arobateau and others utilized "social support, activities, avoidance coping, drugs and alcohol, and self-acceptance" to cope with the minority stress.

== Legacy ==
At a time when Black, explicitly queer artistic expression was virtually invisible in the mainstream, Arobateau's work was more than just homoerotic. It challenged the heterosexual, male-centric vision of Black sexual pleasure and desire at the core of street lit's popularity, expanding the genre into otherwise off-limits realms.

— Naomi Extra
Vice, 2018.

Arobateau was one of the earliest writers and proponents of street lit, transgender and lesbian erotica. A 2018 profile in Vice described his content as "writing that helped pave the way for inclusive depictions of Black sexuality". For his entry in Encyclopedia of Contemporary LGBTQ Literature of the United States (2009), Emmanuel S. Nelson summarized that "arguably Red Jordan Arobateau is the first and probably most prolific female-to-male transsexual writer of African American descent."

According to Shockley, characters Arobateau depicted had been "largely ignored or glossed over in the whole of Afro-American literature by black female writers." In To Write Like a Woman (1995), Joanna Russ characterizes works such as Arobateau's fiction to be "a few of the marvelous things that exists outside the pale of the dominators". Michelle Tea concluded that "if our culture wasn't sickened with so many isms, he would be much more well-known, studied, and respected." Shockley and Tea have mentioned Arobateau as one of their inspirations.

Records and archival material, including Arobateau's self-published works, photographs, personal papers, audio-visual material, and artefacts can be found at the Transgender Archives located at the University of Victoria Special Collections and University Archives in Victoria, BC, Canada.

== Bibliography ==
Novels

- A Blackman is Not a Windup Doll
- A Hillbilly Girl is Like a Butterfly
- A Small Retrospect of My Art Paintings
- Acts Against the Power of Authority
- Ashcan Betty
- At an Early Age
- Autumn Changes
- Barrio Blues
- Blossoming of Gifts
- Boogie Nights/Party Lights
- Boy Center
- Can't Go on Another Day
- China Girl
- Come With Me Lucy
- Compassion
- Daughters of Courage
- Dirty Picture
- Electro Shock Doctor
- Empire!
- Ephemeris – The Book Of Time
- Flash! On The Hustler
- Fisherpeople
- Fleamarket Molly
- For Want Of The Horse The Rider Was Lost
- Garbage Can Sally
- Ho Stroll
- Hobo Sex
- How's Mars?
- I Am A Soul
- In The Strange Embrace Of A Prodigal
- Jailhouse Stud
- Journey series
- Ladies' Auxiliary of the Left/Champagne, Firecrackers, Gunshots & the Smoke From the Death Factory
- Lamentations In The Cool Of The Evening
- La Vida
- Lay Lady Lay
- Leader Of The Pack
- Light At Dawn
- Lucy & Mickey
- Man Gone/Starvax
- Mein Theory
- Missio Dei
- My Continuing Journey Into Artistic, Spiritual, and Revolutionary Thoughts
- Obedience to the Call of Art
- Outlaws!
- Passage series
- Prisoner Of Hearts
- Saints
- Satan's Best
- Stage Door
- Street Fighter
- The Bacchanalias Society Bash
- The Bars Across Heaven
- The Big Change
- The Black Biker
- The Blood Of Christ Against The Lies of Babylon
- The Clubfoot Ballerina/The Prima Dona
- The Great Heart Bank Robbery
- The Man From The Blax Galaxy
- The Nearness Of You/Sorrow Of The Madonna
- The Rich/The Poor In Spirit
- To The Man With His Hat In His Hand
- Tranny Biker
- Vengeance!
- Westpoint Of The Universe
- Where The World Is No
- White Girl

Short story collections

- Alexander D'oro
- Boys' Night Out
- Doing It For The Mistress
- Rough Trade
- Stories From The Dance Of Life series
- Street Of Dreams
- Suzie Q

Plays

- Carnivalla
- Daughters Of Courage
- Higher Ground
- How Don Juan Died
- In The Malestrom
- Inhabitants Of A Ghettoized Population
- Lavandarette Of My Solitude
- Our Dyke House
- The Love Lament Of Peter Pan
- The Maids

Poetry collections

- Laughter Of The Witch
- The Age of Om
- The Iron Woman
