= Azalea: A Magazine by Third World Lesbians =

American lesbian magazine

- Vol. 3, Issue 1 cover
- Frequency: Quarterly
- First issue: 1977
- Final issue: 1983
- Company: Salsa Soul Sisters, Third World Wimmin Inc Collective
- Language: English

Azalea: A Magazine by Third World Lesbians was a quarterly periodical for Black, Asian, Latina, and Native American lesbians published between 1977 and 1983 by the Salsa Soul Sisters, Third World Wimmin Inc Collective. The Collective also published the Salsa Soul Sisters/Third World Women's Gay-zette (c. 1982).

== Early history ==
Azalea: A Magazine by Third World Lesbians was named after the hardy flower which blooms in spring. Azalea founders Joan Gibbs, Robin Christian, and Linda Brown formed in 1974, growing out of the Black Lesbian Caucus of the New York City Gay Activists Alliance (GAA). At the time there were no periodicals publishing stories by women of color. Instead of working within confines of the powers that oppressed them they began creating their own organizations and institutions. One of the founders, Joan Gibbs gives this reason to why Azaleas started

"Azalea was started because at the time people were constantly complaining about how the, quote, unquote, white feminist and lesbian publications weren't publishing writings by black and Latina women principally. So then I decided, well, why don't we just start our own magazine and stop complaining. There's no point in complaining constantly. You just do it yourself."

Azalea mission as explained by Joan Gibbs is further exemplified by a quote from the introduction of every Azalea issue.

Black lesbian publishing ventures of "second wave" feminism include the radial lesbian collective Azalea, which began in the late 1970s with a mission to publish unedited works by women of color and ended in the early 1980s.

Azalea reached out to further their mission through the community they were organizing. A significant step towards organizing the community was to publish stories without editing them. refused to edit articles sent to them and published them without editing them. An excerpt from the introduction of many of issues of Azalea elaborates how the group realized the need for independent community action.

Azalea was created partially... because we feel that a lot of feminist and/or lesbian publications build walls around themselves in the same way as establishment publications do and it has been our experience that whenever standards are set in this country, the people who most often set them are white and thusly have not sought to include third world people

It was made clear by the magazine that they wanted to offer a space for third world lesbian writers. Azalea was one of the driving components of minority recognition through community organization throughout the late 70s until 1983 when it released its final issue.

== Content ==
Rodger Streitmatter, author of Unspeakable: The Rise of the Gay and Lesbian Press in America, notes that the founders of the periodical attempted not to perpetuate oppression and replicate societal biases by refusing to "assess the quality of contributions sent to them, publishing all material without any editing." This was clearly expressed with the following message being printed into every volume, with minor variations in earlier versions:

we print what You send us; anything that is important to ourselves Third

World lesbians. We readily accept and welcome work from “newcomers”

as well as “regulars.” One of our commitments is to publish 3rd world

lesbian writers and visual artists whose work has never appeared in

AZALEA. Therefore...it may sometimes become necessary to return

material to womyn whose work has already appeared in two

CONSECUTIVE previous issues—asking you to hold it for a later issue or

to submit something else at another time.

Azalea's goal was to reach out and fill a void in contemporary publications that excluded Black and Latina writers.

The magazine published contributions from Africa, Asia and South America as well as material from the United States. The first bibliography issue featured Toni Morrison, Audre Lorde, Toni Cade Bambara, Pat Parker, Lorraine Hansberry, and Zora Neale Hurston as writers. Artists also contributed to the magazine. Irare Sabasu drew portrait silhouettes that were featured on many covers.^{:102} Azalea published three issues from 1977 to 1982; during their last year in 1983 they only issued 2 copies.

== Select contributors ==
- Donna Allegra
- Becky Birtha
- Linda Jean Brown
- Robin Christian
- Michelle Cliff
- a. S. Natwa
- Joan Gibbs
- Julie Blackwomon Carter
- Robinet LaVerne Christian
- Michiyo Fukaya (Michiyo Cornell)
- Audre Lorde
- Anita Cornwell
- Rosita Libre de Marulanda
- Sapphire
- Irare Sabasu
- Jewelle Gomez

== See also ==
- Black feminism
- Racism in the LGBT community
- Womanism
- List of lesbian periodicals
