= Salsa Soul Sisters =

Oldest Black Lesbian Organisation

The Salsa Soul Sisters, today known as the African Ancestral Lesbians United for Societal Change, is the oldest Black lesbian organization in the United States. Operating from 1974 to 1993 in New York City, the Salsa Soul Sisters identified as lesbians, womanists, and women of color. Arguments within the Salsa Soul Sisters resulted in a split into two groups, Las Buenas Amigas for Latina Lesbians and African Ancestral Lesbians United for Societal Change for African-diaspora lesbians.

== History ==
In the aftermath of the 1969 Stonewall Riots, the Gay Liberation Front was formed in New York City. In the same year, members split to form the Gay Activists Alliance (GAA). Local minister Dolores Jackson saw a need to particularly focus on issues of racism impacting lesbians of color within the GAA, so in 1971, she and other GAA members internally formed the Black Lesbian Caucus. The initial Salsa Soul Sisters group was intended to create a safe space for women of color to focus on their needs and directly address the sociopolitical issues affecting their community.

In 1974, the Black Lesbian Caucus reformulated itself as "Salsa Soul Sisters, Third World Wimmin Inc", an autonomous group of Black and Latina lesbians offering its members a social and political alternative to lesbian and gay bars, which had "historically exploited and discriminated against lesbians of color." They originally called themselves the Third World Gay Women's Association, with the informal moniker Salsa-Soul Sisters. The original group was led by Dolores Jackson, Harriet Alston, Sonia Bailey, Luvenia Pinson, Candice Boyce, and Maua Flowers.

The group held weekly meetings to discuss social and political issues. Meeting spaces included a fire station in Manhattan (1974-1976), Washington Square United Methodist Church (1976-1987), and the LGBTQ Community Center (1987). Informal meetings often took place in members' homes. From 1977 to 1983, Salsa Soul Sisters published their own magazine, Azalea: A Magazine by Third World Lesbians. They developed a newsletter, Salsa Soul Gazette, in 1982.

The group was active in protests, demonstrations, and community organizing in New York City, and organization leaders frequently invited speakers to their events, including Betty Powell, Audre Lorde, Pat Parker, Jewelle Gomez, and Barbara Smith.

Throughout its 19-year existence, the group's membership grew to 200 women of all ages, identities, and backgrounds. In 1993, the group split into two separate organizations, the African Ancestral Lesbians United for Societal Change (for African-diaspora lesbians) and Las Buenas Amigas, or The Good Friends, for Latina lesbians.

Salsa Soul Sisters continues to be recognized as a historically significant community of LGBTQ activists who paved the way for many queer women of color. In November 2019, the Center for Women's History at the New York Historical celebrated Salsa Soul Sisters with a panel featuring Cassandra Grant, Imani Rashid, Roberta Oloyade Stokes, and Shawn(ta) Smith-Cruz, who discussed the organization's history and victories as well as ongoing struggles. At the event, speaker and First Lady of New York City Chirlane McCray shared her experience as a Salsa Soul Sister member.

== Organization goals ==
The Salsa Soul Sisters was one of the first lesbian organizations created by and for women of color. The Salsa Soul Sisters was born out the need for an inclusive space for lesbian women of color to discuss the problems and concerns they face based on sex and race. Early collective member and activist Candice Boyce said that, at the time of the group's founding, "there was no other place for women of color to go and sit down and talk about what it means to be a black lesbian in America." The founders hoped to create "an organization that is helpful and inspiring to third world gay women" and to "share in the strengthening and productivity of the whole gay community."

Salsa Soul Sisters particularly focused on inclusion for Black and Latina women, and ultimately expanded to include Asian-American and Indigenous women as well as women who identified as gay, bisexual, and same-gender loving. The organization chose to define their goals as womanist rather than feminist to specify that their organizing goals were geared towards issues affecting women of color and centered the experiences and contributions of Black feminists.

The group was comprised equally of African-American and Latina women and used the name Salsa Soul Sisters to reference their membership's identities. The group's activities ranged from "vocational workshops and seminars on handicrafts, art crafts and martial arts for street protection." The Salsa Soul Sisters provided a space for a cooperative babysitting venture where mothers could come to weekly meetings and bring their children.

== Jemima Writers Collective ==
The Jemima Writers Collective was formed by members of the Salsa Soul Sisters to "meet the need for creative/artistic expression and to create a supportive atmosphere in which Black women could share their work and begin to eradicate negative self images."

== Publications ==
Salsa Soul Sisters published several quarterly magazines, including Azalea: A Magazine by Third World Lesbians (1977-1983) and Salsa Soul Gayzette (1982).

== African Ancestral Lesbians United for Societal Change ==
The African Ancestral Lesbians United for Social Change (AALUSC) is a newer name for the organization. The group is "committed to the spiritual, cultural, educational, economic and social empowerment of African Ancestral womyn." The AALUSC provides a space for all lesbians of the African Diaspora to become educated and empowered with the use of educational tools, resources, and social opportunities such as dances, theater, cultural events, and conferences.

== See also ==
- Black feminism
- Lesbian
- Womanism
