= Loving Her =

1974 novel by Ann Allen Shockley

- First edition
- Author: Ann Allen Shockley
- Language: English
- Published: Bobbs-Merrill
- Publication date: 1974
- Publication place: United States

Loving Her (1974) is a novel written by American author and journalist Ann Allen Shockley. The novel is widely considered to be one of the first, if not the first, published pieces of black lesbian literature, as it openly features a black lesbian protagonist and an interracial lesbian relationship.

== Plot summary ==
=== Chapters 1–5 ===
The novel begins with an introduction to Renay's life and a look into her unhappy marriage to Jerome Lee Davis. A young black woman, Renay is a talented pianist, yet only plays for supplemental income in a supper club, called the Peacock Supper Club, a couple of nights a week. After Jerome Lee strikes her, Renay and her young daughter Denise leave him and move in with Terry Bluvard, Renay's new romantic interest, a wealthy white lesbian that she met at her work.

Although the "present day" in the novel begins with Renay's moving in with Terry, much of the novel is recounted in Renay's recountings of past events. Renay discusses her meeting of Jerome Lee, a popular and athletic football star, while in college. Jerome Lee courted Renay incessantly, but has no success until she is accused of perhaps not liking men, which is when she succumbs to a date with him. At the end of one of their dates, Jerome Lee forces himself upon Renay, raping and impregnating her with a child, Denise, that results in their marriage and incompletion of college. Following the birth of Denise, Jerome Lee begins to drink heavily and takes odd jobs, predominantly as a traveling hair supplies salesman, which he implements as a tool and guise for rampant marital infidelity. Just before Renay decides to leave him, Jerome Lee sells her childhood piano for liquor money, indicating Renay's last straw and a physical altercation between them that leads to Jerome Lee striking her.

Renay is slowly introduced to Terry's life as a rich white lesbian, meeting her friends and social circles, and accompanying her to her frequented restaurants and parties. The two women begin to live as domestic partners, and Renay experiences nothing short of a sexual awakening while exploring her new intimate relationship with Terry. Replacing what Jerome Lee sold, Terry buys Renay a beautiful and expensive new piano. Their only arguments stem from Terry wanting Renay to cease her appearances at the club, voicing concern about Jerome Lee potentially stalking her there. Although she was confused at first, Denise comes to adore Terry, who she refers to as Aunt Terry, and she flourishes away from the inattention and subtle abuse of her father.

=== Chapters 6–13 ===
As Terry had suspected, Jerome Lee begins to stalk Renay, first visiting her at the club and causing a scene. Demanding the return of his wife and daughter, Jerome Lee becomes convinced that she has found another man, and threatens both Renay and her supposed new lover. As Renay's life continues to improve, Jerome Lee begins to haunt her in her new life even further. He stalks her at Terry's apartment, which ultimately causes their move to Terry's house in the country after the building manager receives complaints about a lurking black man from "concerned residents".

Although thoroughly accepted by Terry, Renay still experiences subtle yet harsh bouts of discrimination in her new life, with the discrimination of the apartment building manager being one of many. Renay faces harsh discrimination from Terry's ex-lover, Jean Gail, in the form of racial slurs and purported stereotypes, and is accused of stealing money by Terry's white housekeeper. She is often singled out for being black in Renay's predominantly white social circles, yet maintains her dignity and remains unapologetic about her blackness. Although Renay does face some discrimination, the majority of Terry's friends and acquaintances seem to accept her, at least superficially. Phil Millard and Benjie, a fun gay couple, frequent Terry's house and extend their friendship to Renay without question. Renay and Terry often attend parties and outings with Terry's friend Vance Kenton and her much younger girlfriend Lorraine.

After some push from Terry, Renay begins attending college once again, following their move into Terry's house on the outskirts of town in a secluded neighborhood called Willow Wood. The new couple and Denise settle into the new home, with Terry and Renay slowly assuming the stereotypical roles of husband and wife, respectively, and a nuclear family. Renay plays piano much more for purely pleasure and composes a piece that Terry surprises her with publishing it. After Denise finishes school for the year, Renay decides to send her away for the summer to stay with her grandmother, Renay's mother, in fictional Tilltown, Kentucky.

=== Chapters 14–21 ===
During one summer night, an inebriated Jerome Lee follows Terry and Renay back from the club after one of Renay's performances and drives them off the road, but the women manage to drive away without much confrontation. Shortly afterwards, Terry is approached with an offer to travel to New York City to interview an up-and-coming Hollywood starlet, but is concerned with leaving Renay alone after their run-in with Jerome Lee. After Renay insists she can handle her ex-husband, Terry begrudgingly accepts the offer and leaves for two weeks. While Terry is away, Vance's girlfriend Lorraine pays Renay a visit and accompanies her to the club. Afterwards, the women return to Terry's house and a drunk Lorraine attempts to seduce Renay, but is met with rejection and leaves. Renay then finds Jerome Lee in the kitchen, who learns of Renay's sexuality after seeing Lorraine kiss her and overhearing their conversation about Terry. After demanding to know where Denise is, Jerome Lee beats her nearly to death and leaves her bleeding and unconscious on the floor.

Edith Stilling, a friendly neighbor and widow, finds Renay alive but severely beaten, but with no severe injuries. Terry returns home early and Renay beings the healing process. She learns that Jerome Lee has skipped town and that a music publishing company wants to publish her piece "Song for Souls". Once recovered, Renay briefly visits her childhood home in Kentucky to see both Denise and her mother. After she returns, Terry and Renay resume their lives together while Denise remains in Kentucky, and Renay is granted full custody and a divorce from Jerome Lee in a court hearing he fails to attend. Renay continues her studies and Terry works on her novel "A Forest in the Heart", which Mrs. Stilling affirms is based on the relationship of Terry and Renay.

Renay receives a call from Kentucky and learns that Denise has been killed in a car crash after Jerome Lee was visiting and took her for a drive while drunk. After attending Denise's funeral, Renay retracts into herself and becomes withdrawn from Terry and the outside world, wondering if her daughter's death is a punishment from God for her homosexual relationship with Terry. Shortly after, Renay leaves Terry, explaining with a note that she does not want to ruin their relationship with her unhappiness and asks her not to contact her again. Months later, on Christmas Eve, Terry attends Vance's Christmas party and rejects the advances of an attractive woman. Upon returning home, Terry finds Renay asleep on the couch. The two women profess their love for one another and the novel concludes with their passionate reconciliation.

== Characters ==
=== Main characters ===
- Renay Davis: The protagonist of the novel. A young, attractive black female pianist, wife to Jerome Lee Davis, and mother to their young daughter Denise Davis. Her affinity for piano began in her childhood, where she was the protege of piano instructor Miss Pearl Sims. It is for Miss Simms that she has her first inkling of lesbianism, as she develops what was most likely a crush on the much older woman, who is a most likely a lesbian. Neither in high school or college does she have any sexual relationships, and is only pressured into dating Jerome Lee when she is accused of being a lesbian due to her complete lack of male suitors.
- Terrence "Terry" Bluvard: Renay's white lesbian lover. A successful writer, Terry is wealthy from her own success, but was also born into a rich family. A regular at the Peacock Supper Club, Terry requests Renay play her a song and seems to fall for her immediately.
- Jerome Lee Davis: The estranged husband of Renay and father of Denise. A raging alcoholic, Jerome Lee works as a traveling hair supplies salesman, and spends all of his money on gambling and alcohol. In college, where he and Renay met, he was popular and a star football player. He began pursuing Renay because of her looks, but continued because her persistence in rejecting him. On one of the first dates, he rapes Renay and impregnates her, thus ending his college football career when he drops out of college and marries Renay, which he perpetually holds against her.
- Denise Davis: Young, elementary school-aged daughter of Renay and Jerome Lee. She is characterized as bright and energetic, and takes well to living with 'Aunt Terry' after her mother leaves her father. After being sent away for the summer, Denise is killed in a drunk driving crash at the fault of her father.
- Fran Brown: An old friend of Renay's from her hometown. She works as a school teacher and often watches Denise, who calls her Aunt Fran. Fran does not understand Renay's relationship with Terry, as Renay keeps it a secret.
- Vance Kenton: Restaurant owner and good friend of Terry, and is also a lesbian. Vance works intermittently as an artist and often hosts extravagant parties, frequented by other members of the gay community.
- Miss Pearl Sims: Referred to as simply Miss Sims or Sims, Renay's childhood piano instructor. She taught music at the high-school level and gave private music lessons to young hopeful black musicians. She lived in a fairly large house without a husband, and was often referred to as an "old maid", "spinster", and "too much ed-u-cashon to git a man". Miss Sims took a particular liking to Renay and paid particular attention to her training. Although Renay did not know as a child, Miss Sims is a lesbian, which is revealed both through her disapproval of men and her live-in female lover at the end of the novel. It is for Miss Sims that Renay has her first lesbian feelings for, as she wonders if she is in love with Miss Sims during her childhood.

=== Secondary characters ===
- Jean Gail: One of Terry's former lovers, a young, rather brittle and attractive blonde woman who occasionally works as a model. Terry and her met at a magazine office and the two had an affair, an affair which ended as soon as Terry met Renay. Often makes fairly racist remarks and is hostile towards Renay, both because of her relationship with Terry and her race.
- Phil Millard: A professional photographer and Terry's best male friend, the two often work together. A gay man, Phil lives with a much younger man, Benjie. He is consistently very friendly and open-minded when confronted with Renay and Terry's interracial relationship.
- Edith Stilling: Terry's widowed neighbor, an older woman with an appreciation for literature and music. She owns a dog named Walden, his namesake being the novel Walden by Henry David Thoreau. Characterized as friendly and helps Renay after she is beaten by Jerome Lee.
- Lorraine: A young, volatile woman and Vance's live-in lover. Attempts to seduce Renay and eventually leaves Vance towards the end of the novel.
- Miss Wilby: An older stout white woman, former maid of Terry Bluvard. Terry fires her after she accuses Renay of stealing her money.
- Benjie: The 21-year-old live-in lover of Phil Millard. Characterized as relatively immature.
- Ruzicka: The owner of the Peacock Supper Club and Renay's boss.
- Mr. Herald: Manager of Terry's apartment building.
- Clarence Wigginstone II: A black man Renay briefly meets at Benjie's birthday celebration. Like Renay, he is also gay and black and has a white lover. He states that he gets lonely of being the only black person in his social circle and that he is happy to see another.

== Literary significance ==
The release of Loving Her was groundbreaking in itself, as it is seminal work of black lesbian literature and essentially established the foreground for the genre. As proclaimed by author Alycee Lane, author of the forward for Loving Her in its 1997 publication, not only was the novel pioneer in its overarching black lesbian theme, but it was simultaneously the "first to feature a black lesbian as its protagonist." American author and critic Jewelle Gomez wrote in Home Girls that Shockley's novel is "a groundbreaking effort whose mere accomplishment deserves applause". Renowned American novelist Alice Walker applauds Ann Allen Shockley and Loving Her for shining the inceptionary light on interracial lesbianism in a Ms. magazine article in 1975, and stated in a 1998 edition of American Quarterly that Loving Her explores a "daring subject boldy shared" and the novel is of "immense value" and it "allows us glimpses at physical intimacies between women that have been, in the past, deliberately ridiculed or obscured."

According to literary critic and women's studies scholar Bonnie Zimmerman, the 1974 publication of Loving Her was all the more consequential due to its predating of a 1979 issue of Conditions, an editing collaboration between Barbara Smith and Lorraine Bethel, which made Black lesbian writing "widely public" and put the genre on the literary map. Moreover, the novel contributes to significant debates concerning black women during the 1960s and 1970s, including its confrontation of "racism, patriarchy and hetereosexist institutions that threaten black women's agency". With her work Loving Her, Ann Allen Shockley ultimately delves into the intersectionality of "ethnicity, sexuality, gender, and class".

== Critical reception ==
Upon its publication in 1974, Loving Her was not recognized as a pioneer text in an emergent genre, and would not be recognized as such for years to come. The initial reception of the novel was mediocre at best, receiving little critical reception and no significant recognition in popular culture or the literary world. Moreover, the majority of critical reviews of Loving Her, with few exceptions, "pre-date 1980 and are brief, antiquated, relatively inaccessible, and/or hardly scholarly or meritorious." Even during a time period in which African American women writers were becoming all the more prolific and their works widely recognized, Loving Her was all but overlooked and disregarded by the literary world. This lack of critical reception is perhaps due to a surfeit of shortcomings, including, but not limited to, "poor publicity and inimical reviews, editorial and regional biases, racism, sexism, and homophobia."

Over the years, the novel has received some, yet not extensive, criticism from both the literary and gay communities. However, excluding a few feminist reviews by authors like Alice Walker and Jewelle Gomez, Loving Her received little critical recognition from the black community, which Shockley herself associates with "rampant homophobia" omnipresent throughout the black community. In its seldom mention by the black press, the novel was often discounted for its divergence from the black nationalism ideology. In Black World, critic Frank Lamont Phillips states that Loving Her is not "black enough" to be published in Black World, and even further says that "this bullshit should not be tolerated", when referring to Loving Her as a work of black literature.

Both Shockley and her novel have also been bitingly criticized for bringing up poignant questions of race, class, and sexuality, yet falling short in any attempt to answer them. Significant problems of race and racism are presented in Renay's introduction into Terry's white world, yet these problems "all appear to resolve themselves". Renay is repeatedly discriminated against for her blackness: she is essentially used as entertainment when continuously asked to play piano for Terry's white friends, assumed to be Terry's maid singularly due to her race on multiple occasions, and sexually and verbally assaulted. Shockley not once addresses the notion that "the world which Renay has entered does not have a place for her as an African American." Instead, she focuses on the love that seems to transcend these racial tensions, yet still "fails to explore how race impacts Terry and Renay as a couple."

=== Criticism of black nationalism ===
Although superficially a novel focused on an interracial lesbian relationship, Loving Her contributes significantly to the growing critique of black nationalism, most significantly by black women, during the time of its publication. Now commonly antiquated as a myth, this rhetoric "assumes that black women, in collusion with the white power structure, emasculated black men, thereby preventing them from maintaining their "rightful" position in the black family and society at large." Ann Allen Shockley models the character of Jerome Lee as a human embodiment of this black nationalist discourse, as he emulates this ideal with the blaming of his failures on Renay throughout the novel. In the forward, Alycee Lane argues that the destruction of Renay and Jerome Lee's archetypical relationship, coupled with a more authentic love between Renay and Terry, "critiques nationalist rhetoric on the black family". Moreover, in Black Women Novelists and the National Aesthetic, author Madhu Dubey asserts that Loving Her strays from similar novels of around the same time, such as Toni Morrison's The Bluest Eye or Gayl Jones's Corregidora, in that it does not "conclude with a strained adjustment to the heterosexual parameters of black nationalism." Through a black feminist lens presented in a literary review in Obsidian III, the character of Jerome Lee bolsters the idea that "black men, in order to assert their masculinity and sense of self, denigrate Black women", presumably a resulting burden of black nationalism on black women.

=== Adherence to heteronormative gender roles ===
A significant criticism of Loving Her surrounds Ann Allen Shockley's maintaining of archetypal heterosexual relationship roles within the homosexual relationship of Renay and Terry. As described by Le-Ann Elgie in her critical review in MELUS, "Renay runs from the patriarchal and heterosexist world of Jerome Lee, she finds a world in which very similar principles of control are perpetuated." Terry assumes the stereotypical role of the man, paying the bills, generating the income, and relying on Renay for the majority of domestic duties and household chores, which are roles nearly identical to those once assumed by Renay and her ex-husband and the postwar 1950s family. In an additional critical review in Lesbian Tide by its founder Jeanne Cordova, Cordova ascertains that Loving Her falls short in that its story of two women in a relationship falls victim to traditional heterosexist models, and also further criticizes the work for its stereotypical contribution to the lesbian genre, saying "every bad lesbian novel begins at night in bed", which refers to the beginning of Loving Her. Le-Ann Elgie perpetuates this idea, saying that the life that Terry brings Renay into is not so unlike the "oppressive, patriarchal and hetereosexist world that Renay had left behind."
