= Black lesbian literature in the United States =

Literary subgenre focusing on the experiences of Black lesbians

Black lesbian literature is a subgenre of lesbian literature and African American literature that focuses on the experiences of black lesbians. The genre features poetry and fiction about black lesbian characters as well as non-fiction essays which address issues faced by black lesbians. Figures within the genre include Ann Allen Shockley, Audre Lorde, Cheryl Clarke, and Barbara Smith.

Black lesbian literature is characterized by its central focus on black women's experiences as they are shaped by interlocking systems of oppression like racism, sexism, homophobia, and class discrimination.

== Overview ==
Black lesbian literature emerged from the Black Feminist movement of the late 1960s and early 1970s. Dissatisfied with the inability of both the feminist movement of the 1960s and the Civil Rights Movement to address the specific forms of oppression experienced by black women, these writers produced critical essays and fictional works which gave voice to their experiences, using Black Feminist theories like intersectionality as tools to carry out their analysis. Through this critical analysis, black lesbian writers and activists were able to use the genre to make necessary interventions in the normative ideologies regarding race, gender, and sexuality which emerged from these larger political movements.

More specifically, the genre allowed black lesbians to examine the homophobia that they encountered in nearly all of their political and community circles. Writer and activist Cheryl Clarke wrote essays like "The Failure to Transform: Homophobia in the Black Community" and "Lesbianism: An Act of Resistance", which both explore the way that white male patriarchy and white supremacy create the gendered and racialized forms of homophobia that black lesbians experience.

In 1977, the self-proclaimed activist group of black feminists and lesbians known as the Combahee River Collective published a statement in which they outlined their main political objectives to fight racism, sexism, homophobia, and class oppression simultaneously. Although many prominent activists were involved in the conception of the statement, the piece was drafted and finalized by Demita Frazier, Beverly Smith, and Barbara Smith. Within the statement, the group declared its rejection of Lesbian separatism, deeming it ineffective as a political strategy because it excludes others, namely progressive black men, from joining their cause.

One of the foundational texts of the genre is Ann Allen Shockley's novel, Loving Her. Published in 1974, Loving Her is widely considered to be one of the first, if not the first, published pieces of black lesbian literature. The book follows the story of Renay, a black woman who leaves her abusive marriage to a black man to enter a relationship with a white lesbian named Terry. Loving Her is considered groundbreaking for its explicit portrayal of lesbian sexuality, and it paved the way for black women writers to depict lesbian relationships in their writing.

Shockley followed the publication of Loving Her with two more books, The Black and White of It, a collection of short stories featuring various black lesbian protagonists, which was the first of its kind, and another novel, Say Jesus and Come to Me. Other works began to arrive in the early 1980s which featured black lesbian protagonists like Alice Walker's novel The Color Purple and Audre Lorde's autobiography Zami: A New Spelling of My Name. While both novels explored the development of their characters' sexuality, they also examined the characters' experiences as black women in a sexist and white supremacist society. In 1983, Anita Cornwell wrote the first published collection of essays by an African-American lesbian, Black Lesbian in White America.

== Notable works ==
=== Fiction ===
- Loving Her, Ann Allen Shockley (1974)
- The Black and White of It, Ann Allen Shockley (1980)
- The Women of Brewster Place, Gloria Naylor (1982)
- Sassafrass, Cypress & Indigo, Ntozake Shange (1982)
- Say Jesus and Come to Me, Ann Allen Shockley (1982)
- Zami: A New Spelling of My Name, Audre Lorde (1982)
- The Color Purple, Alice Walker (1982)
- "The Champagne Lady," Hatshepsut's Legacy, SDiane Adamz-Bogus (ca. 1985)
- Living as a Lesbian, Cheryl Clarke (1986)
- The Gilda Stories, Jewelle Gomez (1991)
- Coffee Will Make You Black, April Sinclair (1994)
- Afrekete: An Anthology of Black Lesbian Writing, Catherine McKinley and L. Joyce DeLaney (1995)
- In Another Place, Not Here, Dionne Brand (1996)
- Does Your Mama Know?: An Anthology of Black Lesbian Coming Out Stories, Lisa C. Moore (1997)
- "Miss Hannah's Lesson," Callaloo and Other Lesbian Love Stories, LaShonda Barnett (1999)
- Not Everything Is A Eulogy, Crystal Valentine (2015)
- Under the Udala Trees, Chinelo Okparanta (2015)
- Here Comes the Sun, Nicole Dennis-Benn (2016)
- i shimmer sometimes, too, Porsha Olayiwola (2019)

=== Non-Fiction ===
- The Combahee River Collective Statement, Demita Frazier, Beverly Smith, and Barbara Smith (1977)
- The Black Lesbian in American Literature: An Overview, Ann Allen Shockley (1979)
- Lesbianism: An Act of Resistance, Cheryl Clarke (1981)
- The Failure to Transform: Homophobia in the Black Community, Cheryl Clarke (1983)
- Homegirls: A Black Feminist Anthology, Barbara Smith (1983)
- Black Lesbian in White America, Anita Cornwell (1983)
- Sister Outsider: Essays and Speeches, Audre Lorde (1984)
- Mouths of Rain: An Anthology of Black Lesbian Thought, Briona Simone Jones (2021)

== See also ==
- Lesbian literature
- Lambda Literary Award for Lesbian Fiction
- Lesbian pulp fiction
- Yuri (genre)
- List of lesbian fiction
- Bisexual literature (includes lesbian, gay and heterosexual encounters)
- Gay literature (historically, the term "gay literature" was often used to cover both gay male and lesbian literature)
- LGBT themes in speculative fiction (includes lesbian, gay, bisexual, and transgender literature)
- List of LGBT-themed speculative fiction (includes lesbian, gay, bisexual, and transgender themed speculative fiction)
