= Movement in Black =

Poetry collection by Pat Parker

Movement In Black is a collection of poetry by Black lesbian feminist Pat Parker.

== Publication history ==
The collection was originally published by Diana Press in 1978. When Diana Press closed in 1979, Movement In Black went out of print. In 1983, Crossing Press issued a facsimile edition of the collection, though the title was once again unavailable by 1987. Shortly after Parker's death in 1989, Firebrand Books published its first edition of the collection, which included a foreword by Audre Lorde and an introduction by Judy Grahn. Ten years later, Firebrand released An Expanded Edition of Movement In Black, which includes a new section of previously unpublished work, an introduction by Cheryl Clarke, and "Celebrations, Remembrances, Tributes" by ten Black writers including Lorde, Angela Y. Davis, Pamela Sneed, and Barbara Smith.

== Summary ==
The poems featured in the collection center around Parker's experiences as a Black woman, lesbian, feminist, mother, writer, poet, and activist. In its first three pressings, Movement In Black had four sections: Married, Liberation Fronts, Being Gay, and Love Poems; the expanded edition includes a fifth section, New Work. As the titles suggest, the poetry in the original four sections explored Parker's two tempestuous marriages and divorces ("Sometimes My Husband Acts Like a Man"; "Exodus (to my husbands, lovers)"), her radical activism ("Don't Let the Fascists Speak", "For the White Person Who Wants to Know How to Be My Friend", "Movement in Black"), her queer identity ("My Lover Is a Woman", "For the Straight Folks Who Don't Mind Gays But Wish They Weren't So BLATANT"), and love ("Sunshine", "On Jealousy").

== Critical analysis ==
According to Amy Washburn, Movement In Black "emblematizes intersectionality and simultaneity as forms of revolution in struggles of self and society." Focusing on "themes of time and space, marginalization and movement, difference and power, visibility and invisibility, and history and memory," Parker used autobiographical writing "to fuse personal and political sites of resistance." Jewelle Gomez states that throughout Movement In Black, as Parker "was always doing", she used "plain language and ritual to valorize the ordinary life experiences of Black women. In doing so she gave others a glimmer of possibility for growth and change."
