= Joan Gibbs =

Activist attorney in New York City

Joan Gibbs (January 17, 1953 – March 14, 2024) was a lawyer, activist, and a founding editor of Azalea, the first literary journal for Black lesbians. She also co-founded Dykes Against Racism Everywhere, the first anti-racist lesbian organization in the United States. She achieved legal victories on behalf of organizations and activists within the United States. She helped craft a political campaign that led to passage of New York City Council Resolution 0285, calling on the U.S. Congress and President Joe Biden to end the U.S. embargo against Cuba and the restrictive travel ban on U.S. citizens.

== Early life and education ==
Gibbs was born in Harlem on January 17, 1953, and raised in Swan Quarter, N.C., returning to New York City at the age of 14.

In her youth, Gibbs was a member of left organizations; she was later an active participant in the fledgling LGBTQIA+ movement.

Gibbs attended the Bronx High School of Science and received her bachelor's degree from SUNY Empire State. She graduated from Rutgers Law School in 1985, where she studied constitutional and civil rights law. She was admitted to practice in New York, New Jersey, the New York State Court of Appeals, and the United States Supreme Court.

== Legal career ==
Before law school, Gibbs worked at the National Lawyers Guild's Grand Jury Project.

She was a Marvin Karpatkin Fellow in the National Office of the ACLU. As staff attorney for its Women's Rights Project, she litigated sex discrimination cases under the 14th Amendment and Title VII of the Civil Rights Act of 1964.

As staff attorney for the Center for Constitutional Rights, Gibbs litigated cases involving gender and racial justice and represented political activists such as Herman Ferguson. Gibbs was lead counsel in a CCR case that revealed New York Police Department surveillance of civil rights organizers. In 1987, with Paula Ettelbrick of Lambda Legal Defense, Gibbs sued the New York State Department of Corrections for refusing to let a prisoner with AIDS participate in a family reunification program. In 1988, Gibbs represented many arrested in ACT UP demonstrations protesting the undercount of people living with HIV in the city health commissioner's office. Gibbs also represented the Haitian American Anti-Defamation League after the CDC labeled them a high-risk category for AIDS. Along with Margaret Ratner, she sued DOCS for improper training of guards at Rikers. In 1989, with Peter Weiss, David Cole and Ellen Yaroshefsky, Gibbs sued the NEA on behalf of Karen Finley and David Wojnarowicz, after the agency rescinded grants to artists who had portrayed gay sex.

Gibbs served as general counsel for the Center for Law and Social Justice (CLSJ) of Medgar Evers College for approximately 28 years, working on redistricting cases, among others. She also served as project director of the CLSJ Immigration Law Program. She was appointed to the New York City Campaign Finance Board's Voter Assistance Advisory Committee, interviewed in media and contributed to academic journals.

As an independent attorney, Gibbs also represented political activists, including members of the Black Panther Party such as Sundiata Acoli and Mumia Abu Jamal. Abu Jamal devoted an episode of his radio show to an obituary for Gibbs. Gibbs was also a long-term member of the National Conference of Black Lawyers' International Affairs Section.

== Poet, Editor, Journalist, and Public Speaker ==
As a high school student, Gibbs spoke at the April 24, 1971 March on Washington against the Vietnam war. Gibbs was a writer for the Liberation News Service, the activist news agency.

Gibbs was the founding editor of Azalea: A Magazine by Third World Lesbians which published fiction, poetry, and other forms by writers including Audre Lorde, Sapphire, and Jewelle Gomez. Azalea was published between 1977 and 1983. In 1980, Gibbs co-edited the anthology Top Ranking: A Collection of Articles on Racism and Classism in the Lesbian Community.

Gibbs' own poetry was published in the Iowa Review. She also self-published a book, Between a Rock and a Hard Place.

In 2010, Gibbs spoke at the CLAGS conference on lesbian organizing in the 1970s, "In Amerika They Call Us Dykes: Lesbian Lives in the 1970s." Gibbs spoke at the plenary event "Defining the Boundaries of Lesbian Identity."

== Political Activist and Organizer ==
Gibbs co-founded an anti-racist organization called Dykes Against Racism Everywhere (DARE). Gibbs played a role in numerous international campaigns, including the U.S. anti-apartheid movement. For decades, Gibbs was active in the Jericho Movement for Recognition and Amnesty for U.S. Political Prisoners.

Until 2014, Gibbs was co-chair of the board of the Brecht Forum.

Notably, she helped organize the successful campaign for New York City Council's Resolution 0285, which in 2022 called on the U.S. Congress and President Joe Biden to end the U.S. embargo against Cuba and the restrictive travel ban on U.S. citizens. The resolution also called for removing Cuba from the State Sponsors of Terrorism list. In recognition of Gibbs' work, Ambassador Yuri A. Gala López, Deputy Permanent Representative of Cuba to the United Nations, addressed her memorial on June 8, 2024.

Gibbs worked on behalf of People United for Children, a group advocating for children in foster care, headed by Sharonne Salaam, mother of Councilmember Yusef Salaam of the Exonerated Five.

== Later Years and Death ==
In 2023, Gibbs underwent a series of surgeries related to cardiovascular disease. She died on March 14, 2024 at her home in Brooklyn.
