= Mouths of Rain =

2021 anthology edited by Briona Simone Jones

Mouths of Rain: An Anthology of Black Lesbian Thought
- Editor: Briona Simone Jones
- Language: English
- Subject: African American lesbians
- Publisher: The New Press
- Publication date: 1 February 2021
- Publication place: United States
- Media type: Print (paperback) / Digital
- Pages: 400
- ISBN: 9781620975763
- OCLC: 1142887203
- Website: https://thenewpress.com/books/mouths-of-rain

Mouths of Rain: An Anthology of Black Lesbian Thought is a nonfiction debut anthology edited by Briona Simone Jones. It includes essays, poetry, and other writings by Black lesbian feminists such as Audre Lorde, Cheryl Clarke, and Bettina Love. The book was published by The New Press on February 1, 2021. The book received the Judy Grahn Award and the Lambda Literary Award for Anthology.

== Synopsis ==
Mouths of Rain is a compilation of writings spanning 1909 to 2019 from Black lesbian women and others who have had intimate relationships with other Black women. It was intended as a companion to the 1995 anthology Words of Fire by Beverly Guy-Sheftall, and contains writings by: Alice Walker, Cheryl Clarke, Audre Lorde, Pauli Murray, Barbara Smith, and Bettina Love.

The contents include essays, poetry, short fiction, and personal recollections. The anthology is divided into five sections, each with a different broad focus: uses of the erotic; interlocking oppressions and identity politics; coming out and stepping into; the sacred; and radical futurities. Topics covered include sexism, Afrofuturism, and white reviewers.

The editor, Briona Simone Jones, is a Black lesbian feminist of African American and Jamaican descent. She received her doctoral degree in English from Michigan State University in 2021. Jones' stated goal was to "trace the trajectories of liberation, from self to community, through Black lesbian thought".

== Reception ==
Mouths of Rain received positive critical reception. Library Journal gave the anthology a starred review in which Ahliah Bratzler wrote: "...an essential component to any social science shelf, this is transformative, vital reading." Charles Green of Lambda Literary praised the collection as a "timely anthology of writings that will certainly spark conversations, connections, and ideas, both within the community and beyond." Publishers Weekly referred to it as "inspiring and prodigious."

== Publication ==
- Jones, Briona Simone (2021). Mouths of Rain: An Anthology of Black Lesbian Thought. New Press. ISBN 978-1-62097-576-3.

== Accolades ==
- 2022 – Winner, Lambda Literary Award for Anthology
- 2022 – Winner, The Judy Grahn Award for Lesbian Nonfiction

== See also ==
- Black lesbian literature in the United States
- Black feminism
