= Achebe Betty Powell =

American activist

- Achebe Betty Powell, from a 1978 publication; photographed by Cynthia MacAdams
- Born: Betty Jean Kelly; June 14, 1940; Florida, U.S.
- Died: February 21, 2023 (age 82); Brooklyn, New York, U.S.
- Occupations: Educator, activist, consultant, community leader
- Known for: Co-founder of Astraea Lesbian Foundation for Justice

Achebe Betty Powell (June 14, 1940 – February 21, 2023) was an American activist and community leader. She was co-founder of the Astraea Lesbian Foundation for Justice, and served on the board of the National LGBTQ Task Force.

== Early life and education ==
Betty Jean Kelly was born in Florida, the daughter of Jesse Kelly and Rachel Harris (later known as Rachel Long). She lived in Germany for several years as a teenager, because her father was in the United States Army and stationed there. She converted to Catholicism in Germany, and graduated from the College of St. Catherine with a bachelor's degree in French. She earned a master's degree in French language and literature from Fordham University in 1964.

== Career ==
Powell taught high school French in New York City, and was a French and linguistics professor at Brooklyn College. She was director of the Kitchen Table Press. In 1989, she started a consulting business, Betty Powell Associates, focused on diversity policies and anti-racism training.

Powell was a founding member of Salsa Soul Sisters and the National Coalition of Black Lesbians and Gays. She was co-founder of the Astraea Lesbian Foundation for Justice. She was the first Black lesbian member of the board of the National Gay Task Force. In 1977, she participated in a White House meeting of LGBTQ leaders with Jimmy Carter. She was featured in a documentary, Word is Out (1977).

Powell was active in the United Nations World Conferences on Women, and SAGE, an advocacy organization for LGBTQ elders. In 2003 she co-founded Queers for Economic Justice with Martin Duberman. In 2004 she gave an oral history interview for the Sophia Smith Collection of Women's History at Smith College.

== Personal life and legacy ==
Betty Kelly was briefly married to Bill Powell in the 1960s. Her longterm partners were Virginia Apuzzo and Linda Fraser. At age 65, Powell changed her named to Achebe Betty Powell.

Powell died from complications of COVID-19 in Brooklyn on February 21, 2023, at the age of 82. Her papers are held in the Sophia Smith Collection of Women's History at Smith College. Her name was added to the National LGBTQ Wall of Honor in 2023.
