= Fukaya (surname) =

Fukaya (written: 深谷) is a Japanese surname. Notable people with the surname include:

- Kenji Fukaya (深谷 賢治, born 1959), Japanese mathematician
- Michiyo Fukaya (1953–1987), American poet and activist
- Takashi Fukaya (深谷 隆司, born 1935), Japanese politician
- Yuki Fukaya (深谷 友基, born 1982), Japanese footballer
