= Becky Birtha =

American poet and children's author

- Born: October 11, 1948 (age 77); Hampton, Virginia, U.S.
- Education: Philadelphia High School for Girls; University at Buffalo (BS); Vermont College of Fine Arts (MFA)
- Occupations: Author, poet
- Website: www.beckybirtha.net

Becky Birtha (born October 11, 1948) is an American poet and children's author who lives in the greater Philadelphia area. She is best known for her poetry and short stories depicting African-American and lesbian relationships, often focusing on topics such as interracial relationships, emotional recovery from a breakup, single parenthood and adoption. Her poetry was featured in the acclaimed 1983 anthology of African-American feminist writing Home Girls: A Black Feminist Anthology, edited by Barbara Smith and published by Kitchen Table: Women of Color Press. She has won a Lambda Literary award for her poetry. She has been awarded grants from the Pew Fellowships in the Arts, the National Endowment for the Arts and the Pennsylvania Council on the Arts to further her literary works. In recent years she has written three children's historical fiction picture books about the African-American experience.

== Early life ==
Rebecca Lucille Birtha was born on October 11, 1948, in Hampton, Virginia, to Jessie Dixon Moore Birtha and Herbert Marshall Birtha. She is the younger sister of Rachel Roxanne Birtha Eitches, a former international radio broadcaster for the Voice of America. She self-identifies as an African American with Cherokee, Catawba, African, and Irish heritage, all of which inform her writing.

Birtha grew up in Philadelphia, Pennsylvania after the family moved to the Germantown section of the city in 1952. In 1963 the family relocated to the West Mount Airy neighborhood and Birtha attended the Philadelphia High School for Girls. She attended the State University of New York at Buffalo for a Bachelor of Science degree in Child Studies in 1973 and later obtained a Master of Fine Arts degree in Writing from the Vermont College of Fine Arts in 1984. In addition to her writing, she has worked as a teacher, a legal librarian, and as a representative for an adoption agency.

== Career and writings ==
Birtha's first published book of short stories was For Nights Like This One: Stories of Loving Women (1983), an anthology of short stories about lesbian relationships. Her second book, Lovers' Choice, continues Birtha's focus upon the experience of marginalized African-American women in such stories as "Route 23: 10th and Bigler to Bethlehem Pike", in which a desperate mother takes her children on an all-night public bus ride through the city of Philadelphia in order to keep them warm.

She wrote the foreword for Breaking Silence (1983) by Anne B. Keating in November 1983. Birtha and Keating were members of a local feminist writers' workshop in Philadelphia under the aegis of a local chapter of the Feminist Writers Guild.

In 1991, Birtha published The Forbidden Poems, an anthology of poetry focusing on lesbian relationships. According to Birtha, "Several [of the] poems were written as part of the process of recovering from the breakup of a 10-year lesbian relationship, of trying to find a way to deal with the feelings that the breakup produced in [her]". The Publishers Weekly review of The Forbidden Poems states that in her writings Birtha exhibits a "considerable ability to endow ordinary perceptions and occurrences with a profound significance" in her depictions of a lesbian community that is "stable, loving and creative--and whose members can all make a great cup of tea: 'even a hardcore stomping deisel dyke / can't ruin a pot of boiling water.'" Her works have been published in Azalea: A Magazine by Third World Lesbians, Conditions, Sinister Wisdom and Women: a Journal of Liberation. She writes book reviews for The New Women's Times Feminist Review. Ed Hermance, owner and manager of the Philadelphia gay and lesbian bookstore Giovanni's Room, has stated that Birtha's stories "have a vivid sense of place as well as an emotional depth rare among storytellers".

Speaking at the 13th Annual Trenton Writers Conference in 1994, Birtha discussed her career as a writer, stating: "Have being black, a woman and lesbian been the biggest barriers I have had to overcome to become a successful writer? ... No, in fact,... I celebrate it. I am also an adoptive parent, a single mother and a Quaker, and that has not stopped me from writing, either."

In later years, Birtha transitioned to writing primarily for children. Her first children's book Grandmama’s Pride (2005) has earned the Golden Kite book award and placement in the master reading lists of Arkansas, Kansas, Missouri and Georgia. Her second picture book Lucky Beans (2010) was named as one of the New York Public Library's 100 Titles for Reading and Sharing 2010 as well as one of Smithsonian Magazine′s 2010 Notable Books for Children. Birtha is a member of the Society of Children's Book Writers and Illustrators.

== Personal life ==
Birtha lived with her partner Nancy and daughter Tasha in Delaware County, Pennsylvania. As of 2021, she is the caretaker for her elderly mother and resides in the Mount Airy neighborhood of Philadelphia.

She practiced Balkan folkdancing for over seventeen years and later studied other forms of modern and folk dance. Birtha is a member of the Royal Scottish Country Dance Society. Her current hobbies are folk dance and playing the hammered dulcimer.

She is a member of the Religious Society of Friends (Quakers). In February, 1991, she gave a keynote address to the Friends for Lesbian, Gay, Bisexual, Transgender, and Queer Concerns conference in which she described writing as a meditative and healing process that connects her to her Quaker faith.

== Awards ==
In 1985, Becky Birtha received an Individual Fellowship in Literature from the Pennsylvania Council on the Arts. She later received a Creative Writing Fellowship Grant from the National Endowment for the Arts in 1988.

She won a Pushcart Prize in 1989 for her story "Johnnieruth".

In 1992, she won one of the 4th Lambda Literary Awards for her anthology of lesbian poetry, The Forbidden Poems (1991).

She was awarded one of the Pew Fellowships in the Arts grants for $50,000 for the year 1993.

Her children's book Grandmama's Pride (2005) won the 2005 Society of Children's Book Writers and Illustrators Golden Kite Honor Book for Picture Book Text.

Her children's book Lucky Beans (2010) won the 2010 Arkansas Diamond Primary Book Award.

== Selected work ==
Short stories

- For Nights Like This One: Stories of Loving Women, Frog in the Well (January 1983). ISBN 0960362843
- Lovers' Choice, The Seal Press (1987). ISBN 9780931188565

Poetry

- The Forbidden Poems, The Seal Press (1991). ISBN 187806701X

Anthologies

- "Jonnieruth" in McMillan, Terry, ed. Breaking Ice: An Anthology of Contemporary African-American fiction, Viking Press (1990). ISBN 9780670825622. Also in Busby, Margaret, ed. Daughters of Africa: An International Anthology of Words and Writings by Women of African Descent, London: Jonathan Cape (1992). ISBN 978-0224035927
- "Babies" in Mullen, Bill, ed. Revolutionary Tales: African American Women's Short Stories, from the First Story to the Present, Laurel Press (1995). ISBN 9780440220824
- "Ice Castles" in Ruff, Shawn Stewart, ed. Go the Way Your Blood Beats: An Anthology of Lesbian and Gay Fiction by African-American Writers, H. Holt (1996). ISBN 9780805047363
- "Maria de las Rosas" in Smith, Barbara, ed. Home Girls: A Black Feminist Anthology, Rutgers University Press (2000). ISBN 0813527538

Bibliography

- Literature by Black Women: A List of Books (1983)

Children's books

- Grandmama's Pride, Albert Whitman & Co. (2005). ISBN 9780807530283
- Lucky Beans, Albert Whitman & Co. (2010). ISBN 9780807547823
- Far Apart, Close in Heart, Albert Whitman & Co. (2017). ISBN 978-0-8075-1275-3

== See also ==
External videos
- “Becky Birtha reads from Far Apart Close in Heart”, January 28, 2018.
- “Becky Birtha reads her poems”, March 4, 2018.

- African-American literature
- Black Feminism
- Lesbian fiction
- List of poets portraying sexual relations between women
- List of women writers
