= Diane Sabin =

American feminist (born 1952)

Diane A. Sabin
- Born: Diane Abbe Sabin; 1952 (age 73–74); New York City, U.S.
- Education: University of Redlands; University of Redlands
- Occupation: Activist
- Spouse(s): Jewelle Gomez, m. 2008

Diane Abbe Sabin (born 1952 in New York City) is a lesbian feminist activist in the San Francisco Bay Area. Her early work was in production of lesbian musical performers as well as the San Francisco Pride stages. She founded Sabin Chiropractic, a successful community clinic in the Castro. She does activist work to improve the health of lesbians and the LGBT community through representation in the larger health care institutions and research.

Sabin is the Executive Director of the Lesbian Health & Research Center (LHRC) at the University of California, San Francisco as well as the Associate Director for the National Center of Excellence in Women's Health. She co-founded 100 Lesbians and Our Friends, a lesbian philanthropic community initiative, and serves on the board of directors for the National Center for Lesbian Rights, the Astraea Lesbian Foundation for Justice, and Woman Vision. She received the Astraea Philanthropic Activism Award in 2001.

== Early life and education ==
Sabin was born in New York City, the daughter of Helene and Alan Sabin. She grew up in a suburb of Chicago. She graduated from Johnston College at the University of Redlands in Southern California. She received a doctor of chiropractic degree from Life Chiropractic College West in Hayward, California.

She spent some years in Boston, Massachusetts, during the emerging lesbian feminist movement at the time that the oft-quoted Combahee River Collective was in formation, even joining the Boston chapter of the Daughters of Bilitis.

== Career ==
After moving to the San Francisco Bay Area and before becoming a chiropractor, Sabin produced events in San Francisco including the tour of "Narratives: Poems in the Tradition of Black Women" based on the collection of well-known poet and activist Cheryl Clarke. Sabin co-produced in collaboration with two local lesbians of color, Sharon Page Ritchie and Cara Vaughn. She was also responsible for the production of the early San Francisco Pride stage in the 1980s.

She maintained a chiropractic practice in the Castro for more than 15 years where she developed a community-based private clinic.

The group 100 Lesbians and Our Friends held periodic meetings modeled after lesbian pot luck or CR groups, designed to re-educate women about the power of philanthropic giving. The philosophy was that girls are miseducated about their relationship to money from early youth and needed to rethink how they used their economic power and how they might support each other.

Sabin is the executive director of The Lesbian Health & Research Center at University of California, San Francisco. She directs programs working in collaboration with community organizations that develop information about and educate communities about the health of lesbians, bisexual and trans women. She is also the administrative director of the Osher Center for Integrative Medicine at UCSF.

== Right to marry lawsuit ==
She and her partner, Jewelle Gomez, along with twelve other gay couples became part of Woo v Lockyer, a lawsuit against the State of California in 2004. The couple met in 1984 and became friends, but had to delay any romance until both were available to each other years later in 1993. They subsequently registered as domestic partners under California law.

The suit sought the right to marry and the complainants are being represented by the National Center for Lesbian Rights (NCLR) and the American Civil Liberties Union. Sabin had once served as chairwoman on the board of NCLR. Regarding the lawsuit's significance, Sabin said in the San Francisco Daily Journal (3.4.08), a legal periodical: "I think we live in a place where a lot of change is initiated. I think this is a very elemental place. ..it's simply about ending discrimination."

Images of the interracial couple were used by news outlets to illustrate the gay marriage issue, particularly when the 2008 decision striking down California Proposition 8 and DOMA was announced. They were on hand at San Francisco City Hall when the announcements from the U.S. Supreme Court was aired. Their subsequent marriage in October 2008 was reported in The New York Times.
