= New York City Department of Records and Information Services =

Government agency in Manhattan

Department of Records and Information Services
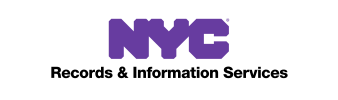

Department overview
- Formed: 1977
- Jurisdiction: New York City
- Headquarters: 31 Chambers Street, New York, NY 10007
- Employees: 78 (2020)
- Department executive: Shawn(ta) Smith-Cruz, Commissioner
- Key document: New York City Charter
- Website: www.nyc.gov/records

The New York City Department of Records and Information Services (DoRIS) is the department of the government of New York City that organizes and stores records and information from the City Hall Library and Municipal Archives. It is headquartered in the Surrogate's Courthouse in Civic Center, Manhattan. Its regulations are compiled in title 49 of the New York City Rules.

DORIS has several divisions, such as the New York City Municipal Archives, which "preserves over 200,000 cubic feet of original documents, photographs, ledgers, maps, architectural renderings, manuscripts, and moving images." The Municipal Archives maintains an online gallery of over 1.6 million photographs and other materials. Notable among the Archives' collections are the 1940s Tax Department photographs, which were taken by the Works Progress Administration between 1939 and 1951. These photographs depict most real estate parcels in the five boroughs. Other divisions include the Municipal Library (not to be confused with the New York Public Library), which preserves New York City government publications and reports, and provides research space; and the Municipal Records Management Division, which "establishes and enforces the City’s record management policies and operates record storage facilities."
