= The Gilda Stories =

1991 debut novel by Jewelle Gomez

- Author: Jewelle Gomez
- Language: English
- Genre: Speculative fiction
- Publication date: 1991

The Gilda Stories is the 1991 debut novel of American author and activist Jewelle Gomez. It is a speculative fiction vampire novel following the experiences of a Black lesbian through multiple time periods.

== Plot ==
The protagonist starts in 1850 as an unnamed runaway slave in Louisiana. After killing a bounty hunter in self-defense, she is rescued by Gilda, a vampire who runs a brothel named Woodard's. The women at the brothel begin to educate her and welcome her into their family. Eventually, she becomes a vampire and adopts Gilda's name when Gilda chooses to end her own life. The novel then proceeds in historical vignettes through different cities and time periods, highlighting key moments in Gilda's life. She is in California in 1890, Missouri in 1921, Massachusetts in 1955, New York in 1981, New Hampshire in 2020, and the "Land of Enchantment" in 2050.

== Themes ==
Kirkus Reviews writes that the heroine's power and morality challenge assumptions about the vampire myth. The movement across time and space also situates the themes of Blackness, sexuality, and female empowerment in various contexts.

== Awards and honors ==
In 1992, The Gilda Stories won the Lambda Literary Award for Lesbian Fiction and the Lambda Literary Award for Lesbian Science Fiction and Fantasy.

To mark the book's 20th anniversary in 2011, readings of it took place at the Museum of the African Diaspora and the Queer Arts Festival.

== Adaptation ==
Gomez's adaptation of the book for the stage, Bones & Ash: A Gilda Story, was performed by the Urban Bush Women in 13 U.S. cities.

== Sequel ==
In 2024, Gomez stated she was working on a sequel to The Gilda Stories. On October 14, 2025, Caramelle & Carmilla is published by Aunt Lute Books. Caramelle & Carmilla pairs a text of Joseph Le Fanu’s 1872 novella Carmilla with a novella set in The Gilda Stories universe.

Caramelle follows two vampires who arrive at a way station on the Underground Railroad not to stalk their prey but to seek sanctuary, intertwining the haunting legacy of American slavery with gothic horror and the resilience of Black women.
