= Shawn(ta) Smith-Cruz =

American librarian and archivist

Commissioner of the New York City Department of Records and Information Services
- Mayor: Zohran Mamdani

Personal details
- Education: City University of New York (BS); Queens College, CUNY (MFA); Queens College, CUNY (MLS)

Shawn(ta) Smith-Cruz is an American librarian and archivist. She became the dean of Barnard College Library in March 2025. In April 2026, Smith-Cruz was appointed Commissioner of the New York City Department of Records and Information Services.

== Early life and education ==
Smith-Cruz is from Brooklyn, New York. She has Jamaican heritage as well as Garifuna heritage through her maternal grandmother, Meruca "Mary" Lambey. At age seventeen, she was the cofounder of Sister Outsider, an organization for and by self-supporting young women in Brooklyn.

She attended the City University of New York (CUNY) Baccalaureate Program, earning a Bachelor of Science degree in queer women's studies. Later she attended Queens College, City University of New York, earning Master of Fine Arts and Master of Library Science degrees.

== Career ==
Smith-Cruz worked for five years as an associate dean at New York University Libraries and for nine years at the CUNY Graduate Center, where she served as Head of Reference. She has also worked as a librarian at Brooklyn Public Library and as an archive coordinator at StoryCorps. She serves on the board of Metropolitan New York Library Council (METRO). In March 2025, she became dean of the library at Barnard College.

Smith-Cruz was appointed as the commissioner of the New York City Department of Records and Information Services (DORIS) by Mayor Zohran Mamdani in April 2026. The Advocate noted that "[h]er appointment places an out LGBTQ+ Black woman in charge of safeguarding the official record of the nation's largest city." Smith-Cruz has been a professor at the Pratt Institute School of Information since 2018.

Smith-Cruz was a coordinator of the Lesbian Herstory Archives for twenty years. In 2020 she was awarded the Award for Significant Achievement in Women & Gender Studies Librarianship from the American Library Association's Women & Gender Studies Section to honor her work with the Lesbian Herstory Archives to collect and preserve materials from the Black lesbian organization Salsa Soul Sisters.

== Publications ==
- Smith-Cruz, Shawn(ta); Howard, Sara A., eds. (2024). Grabbing Tea. Sacramento: Library Juice Press. ISBN 978-1-63400-134-2.
- Bakaitis, Elvis; Smith-Cruz, Shawn(ta); Washburn, Red, eds. (Fall 2020). "Forty-Five Years: A Tribute to the Lesbian Herstory Archives". Sinister Wisdom (118). ISBN 9781944981464.
- Ricket, Allison; Washburn, Amy; Martin, Angela; Warriner, Brynn; Smith-Cruz, Shawn(ta), eds. (Winter 2017). "Celebrating the Michigan Womyn's Music Festival". Sinister Wisdom (103). ISBN 9781944981662.
