= Pat Parker =

American poet and activist

- Born: Patricia Cooks; January 20, 1944; Houston, Texas, U.S.
- Died: June 17, 1989 (aged 45); Oakland, California, U.S.
- Occupations: Poet; activist
- Spouses: Ed Bullins (m. 1962; div. 1966) Robert F. Parker (m. 1966, divorced)
- Partner: Marty Dunham
- Children: 2

Pat Parker (born Patricia Cooks; January 20, 1944 – June 17, 1989) was an African American poet and activist. Both her poetry and her activism drew from her experiences as a Black lesbian feminist. Her poetry spoke about her tough childhood growing up in poverty, dealing with sexual assault, and the murder of a sister. At eighteen, Parker was in an abusive relationship and had a miscarriage after being pushed down a flight of stairs. After two divorces, she came out as a lesbian, "embracing her sexuality" and said she was liberated and "knew no limits when it came to expressing the innermost parts of herself".

Parker participated in political activism and had early involvement with the Black Panther Party and Black Women's Revolutionary Council, and formed the Women's Press Collective. She participated in many forms of activism especially regarding gay and lesbian communities, domestic violence, reproductive rights, civil rights and anti-racism. She released five poetry collections: Child of Myself (1972), Pit Stop (1975), Movement in Black (1978), Womanslaughter (1978), and Jonestown and Other Madness (1985).

== Early life ==
Pat was born on January 20, 1944, in Houston, Texas, to Marie Louise (née Anderson) and Ernest Nathaniel Cooks. Marie Louise worked as a domestic worker and Ernest retreaded tires. She was the youngest of four daughters. The family lived first in the Third Ward and then moved to the Sunnyside neighborhood when Parker was four years old.

She left home at seventeen and moved to Los Angeles to attend college. She attended Los Angeles City College and also was enrolled in San Francisco State College from 1966 to 1967 but did not graduate. (In an NEA application for 1988, Parker writes that she studied Creative Writing at San Francisco State University but did not attain a degree.) She married playwright Ed Bullins in 1962. Both Bullins and Parker became involved in the Black Panther Party in the 1960s.

Parker and Bullins separated after four years. She later said that her ex-husband was physically violent and that she was "scared to death". She married Robert F. Parker, writer and publisher, but decided that the "idea of marriage... wasn't working" for her. She began to identify as a lesbian in the late 1960s, and, in a 1975 interview with Anita Cornwell stated: "after my first relationship with a woman, I knew where I was going."

== Career ==
Parker worked from 1978 to 1988 as the medical coordinator and executive director of the Oakland Feminist Women's Health Center. In 1979 she toured with the "Varied Voices of Black Women", a group of poets and musicians that included Linda Tillery, Mary Watkins, and Gwen Avery. She founded the Black Women's Revolutionary Council in 1980, and she also contributed to the formation of the Women's Press Collective, as well as being involved in wide-ranging activism in gay and lesbian organizing.

Pat Parker was asked by her father to take "the freedom train of education," Parker moved to Oakland California, in the early 1970s to pursue writing and potential opportunities for activist work. Parker also participated in political activism and had early involvement with the Black Panther Party, Black Women's Revolutionary Council and formed the Women's Press Collective. Parker participated in many forms of activism especially regarding gay and lesbian communities, domestic violence, and rights of people of color.

Parker was affiliated with the women in print movement, which sought to establish autonomous communications networks of feminist publications, presses, and bookstores created by and for women. Many women's presses founded during this period, including the Women's Press Collective, operated democratically and nonhierarchically. Poetry was especially significant for the women in print movement, because it was considered an accessible medium that was cheap to print. Parker published many of her early poems through the collective; historians have identified these chapbooks as some of the earliest associated with the women's liberation movement.

== Writing ==
Parker gave her first public poetry reading in 1963 in Oakland. In 1968, she began to read her poetry to women's groups at women's bookstores, coffeehouses and feminist events.

Judy Grahn, a fellow poet and a personal friend, identifies Pat Parker's poetry as a part of the "continuing Black tradition of radical poetry".

Cheryl Clarke, another poet and peer, identifies her as a "lead voice and caller" in the world of lesbian poetry. Designed to confront both black and women's communities with, as Clarke notes, "the precariousness of being non-white, non-male, non-heterosexual in a racist, misogynist, homophobic, imperial culture". Clarke believes that Parker articulates "a black lesbian-feminist perspective of love between women and the circumstances that prevent our intimacy and liberation".

Parker and Audre Lorde first met in 1969 and continued to exchange letters and visits until Parker's death in 1989. Their collaboration inspired many, including lesbian-feminist blues/R&B singer Nedra Johnson, whose song "Where Will You Be?" has become something of a feminist anthem in the USA. Audre Lorde and Pat Parker shared common themes within poetry they wrote as well. Audre Lorde's piece "The Transformation of Silence into Language and Action" talks extensively about action through language, a similar concept seen in Pat Parker's "Where will you be".

=== Womanslaughter ===
Parker's elder sister, Shirley Jones, was shot and killed by her husband. Parker wrote the autobiographical poem, Womanslaughter (1978), based on this event.

In the poem, Parker notes that

Her things were his
including her life.

The perpetrator was convicted of "womanslaughter", not murder, because

Men cannot kill their wives.
They passion them to death.

He served a one-year sentence in a work-release program. Parker brought this crime to the International Tribunal on Crimes against Women in 1976 in Brussels, vowing

I will come to my sisters
not dutiful,
I will come strong.

=== Translations ===
In 2014, the small independent press Ra'av (Hebrew for Hunger) published a wide selection of Parker's work in Israel, translated into Hebrew by Yael "belly" Levi-Hazan, Yael (yali) Dekel, and Hani Kavdiel.

== Death ==
Parker died on June 19, 1989, of breast cancer at the age 45 in Oakland, California. The national lesbian-feminist community mourned her loss, and several things have been named after her, such as Pat Parker Place, a community center in Chicago. She was survived by her long-time partner, Marty Dunham, and her daughters Cassidy Brown and Anastasia Jean.

== Archives ==
Harvard University Library holds Parker's papers, which comprise 18 boxes. The collection includes correspondence, personal papers, writings, scrapbooks, photographs, and recordings of interviews and readings of Parker's poetry.

== Tributes ==
The Pat Parker/Vito Russo Center Library at The Lesbian, Gay, Bisexual & Transgender Community Center in New York City is named in honor of Parker and fellow writer, Vito Russo.

The Pat Parker Poetry Award is awarded each year for a free verse narrative poem or dramatic monologue by a black lesbian poet.

In 2004, composer Awilda Villarini used Parker's text for her song "Dialogue."

In June 2019, Parker was one of the inaugural fifty American "pioneers, trailblazers, and heroes" inducted on the National LGBTQ Wall of Honor within the Stonewall National Monument (SNM) in New York City's Stonewall Inn. The SNM is the first U.S. national monument dedicated to LGBTQ rights and history, and the wall's unveiling was timed to take place during the 50th anniversary of the Stonewall riots.

== Works ==
"Pat Parker, Where Will You Be". YouTube.

=== Books ===
- Child of Myself (1972), The Women's Press Collective
- Pit Stop (1973), The Women's Press Collective
- Womanslaughter (1978), Diana Press
- Movement in Black (1978), Diana Press
- Jonestown & Other Madness (1989), Firebrand Books
- Movement in Black: The Collected Poetry of Pat Parker, 1961–1978; includes work from Child of Myself and Pit Stop, foreword by Audre Lorde, introduction by Judy Grahn, Diana Press (Oakland, California), 1978, expanded edition, introduction by Cheryl Clarke, Firebrand Books (Ithaca, New York), 1999
- Essential Poems (UK title: Selected Poems), Sinister Wisdom, 2025; the87press, 2026. Edited by SaraEllen Strongman.

=== Non-fiction ===
- Unleashing Feminism: Critiquing Lesbian Sadomasochism in the Gay Nineties (1993) (with Anna Livia Julian Brawn and Kathy Miriam)
- Sister Love: The Letters of Audre Lorde and Pat Parker 1974-1989 (UK title: The Letters of Audre Lorde and Pat Parker 1974-1989), Sinister Wisdom, 2018; the87press, 2024. Introduction by Mecca Jamilah Sullivan, edited by Julie R. Enszer.

=== Select anthologies ===
- Amazon Poetry: An Anthology of Lesbian Poetry (1975)
- Where Would I Be Without You? The Poetry of Pat Parker and Judy Grahn, 1976, Olivia Records
- Lesbian Concentrate. Sound Recording, 1977, Olivia Records
- "Revolution: It's Not Neat or Pretty or Quick" in Cherríe Moraga and Gloria Anzaldúa (eds), This Bridge Called My Back, Watertown, Massachusetts: Persephone Press, 1981.
- Home Girls: A Black Feminist Anthology (1983)
- I Never Told Anyone: Writings by Women Survivors of Child Sexual Abuse (1991)
- Plexus

== See also ==
- List of feminist poets
- Lesbian poetry

== Sources ==
- Adams, Kate (1998). "Built Out of Books: Lesbian Energy and Feminist Ideology in Alternative Publishing". Journal of Homosexuality. 34 (3–4): 113–141. doi:10.1300/J082v34n03_07.
- Harker, Jaime (2018). The Lesbian South: Southern Feminists, the Women in Print Movement, and the Queer Literary Canon. University of North Carolina Press. ISBN 9781469643359.
- Harker, Jaime; Farr, Cecilia Konchar (2015). "Introduction". In Harker, Jaime; Farr, Cecilia Konchar (eds.). This Book Is an Action: Feminist Print Culture and Activist Aesthetics. University of Illinois Press. pp. 23–45. ISBN 9780252039805.
- McEwen, Christian, editor, Naming the Waves: Contemporary Lesbian Poetry, Virago (New York City), 1988.
- Moraga, Cherríe, and Gloria Anzaldúa, This Bridge Called My Back: Writings by Radical Women of Color, Women of Color Press, 1981.
- Parker, Pat, Jonestown and Other Madness, Firebrand Books, 1985.
- Parker, Pat, Movement in Black: The Collected Poetry of Pat Parker, 1961–1978, foreword by Audre Lorde, introduction by Judy Grahn, Diana Press (Oakland, California), 1978, expanded edition, introduction by Cheryl Clarke, Firebrand Books (Ithaca, New York), 1999.
- Booklist, March 15, 1999, p. 1279.
- Callaloo, Winter 1986, pp. 259–62.
- Colby Library Quarterly (Waterville, ME), March 1982, pp. 9–25.
- Conditions: Six, 1980, p. 217.
- Feminist Review, Spring 1990, pp. 4–7.
- Library Journal, July 1985, p. 77.
- Margins, Vol. 23, 1987, pp. 60–61.
- Women's Review of Books, April 1986, pp. 17–19.
- Blain, Virginia, Patricia Clements, and Isobel Grundy. The Feminist Companion to Literature in English: Women Writers from the Middle Ages to the Present. New Haven, Connecticut: Yale University Press, 1990: 833.
- Oktenberg, Adrian. In Women's Review of Books (Wellesley, Massachusetts), April 1986: 17–19.
- Ridinger, Robert B. Marks. "Pat Parker", in Gay & Lesbian Literature. Detroit, Michigan: St. James Press, 1994: 289–290.
