= Social artistry =

Social activism through art

Social artistry is the attempt to address or recognize a particular social issue using art and creativity. Social artists are people who use creative skills to work with people or organizations in their community to affect change. While a traditional artist uses their creative skills to express their take on the world, a social artist puts their skills to use to help promote and improve communities. Thus, the main aim of a social artist is to improve society as a whole and to help other people find their own means of creative expression.

Social artists may address issues such as youth alienation or the breakdown of communities. Most commonly, social artists will address these problems by helping people express themselves and find their voice, or by bringing people together and using art to help them to foster an understanding of each other.

Social artistry can incorporate several different art forms including theatre, poetry, music and visual art.

Findings from 2013 confirm the shift from individual expression to community engagement, or "from autonomous to socially engaged." Lingo and Tepper cite several examples:

1. contemporary artists "see themselves as educators, social workers, policy actors, and health providers (Lena & Cornfield, 2008; Simonds, 2013; Throsby & Zednik, 2011)
2. Nick Rabkin writes "more arts graduates end up in education than in any other occupation" (2013)
3. social practice artists "freely blur the lines among object making, performance, political activism, community organizing, environmentalism and investigative journalism, creating a deeply participatory art that often flourishes outside the gallery and museum system"
