= Ann Allen Shockley =

American journalist and author (born 1927)

- Born: June 21, 1927 (age 99); Louisville, Kentucky, U.S.
- Education: Fisk University (BA); Case Western Reserve University (MA)
- Occupations: Author, editor, librarian, critic
- Partner: William Shockley (divorced)
- Children: 2
- Writing career
- Subject: African-American literature Lesbian literature
- Notable works: Loving Her (1974) The Black and White of It (1980); Say Jesus and Come to Me (1982) Celebrating Hotchclaw (2005)

Ann Allen Shockley (born June 21, 1927) is an American journalist, editor and author, specialising in themes of interracial lesbian love, especially the plight of black lesbians living under what she views as the "triple oppression" of racism, sexism, and homophobia. She has also encouraged libraries to place special emphasis on Afro-American collections.

== Life and career ==
Shockley was born in 1927 in Louisville, Kentucky. Shockley was encouraged to read and write creatively at a young age and was heavily influenced by Richard Wright's short-story form in Uncle Tom's Children. Her eighth-grade teacher, Harriet La Forest, was said to serve as Shockley's early mentor and had a large influence on Shockley's writing.

She started writing for an audience in high school, where she worked as the editor for her school's newspaper. She continued to work as a journalist and column writer for various newspapers in her undergraduate studies and later graduated with a bachelor's degree from Fisk University in 1948. Shockley went on to receive her master's degree in library science from Case Western Reserve University in 1959.

She married teacher William Shockley in 1948, and had two children named William Leslie Jr. and Tamara Ann. The couple later divorced but Shockley kept her ex-husband's last name.

Shockley worked as a librarian at Delaware State College and the University of Maryland Eastern Shore, before working for Special Negro Collection at Fisk University in 1969. She served as a professor of library science, university archivist, as well as an associate librarian for special collections at Fisk and founded the Black Oral History Program until she later retired in 1988. Throughout her career, Shockley published several books on librarianship and special collections, particularly related to African-American collections. She became a writer of more than thirty short stories, novels, and articles that address issues of racism and homophobia. Shockley wrote numerous articles on the literature of the time, especially within Black feminist circles and was a noted literary critic and feminist theorist.

Shockley was awarded the Lee Lynch Classics Award for her novel Loving Her, originally published in 1974 and republished in 2014. The award was awarded in 2019 as a part of the 15th Annual Goldie Literary Awards held by the United States's only lesbian literary organization, the Golden Crown Literary Society (GCLS). In honor of her body of work, she also received the Alice B Readers Award in 2006 which included an Honorarium of $500 along with the Alice B Medal.

== Major works ==
=== Newspaper columns ===
Throughout July 1945 through March 1954, Shockley worked as a freelance newspaper columnist. She has several works in newspaper columns documented in the Louisville Defender, Fisk University Herald, Federalsburg [MD] Times, and Bridgeville [DE] News that centered primarily on issues in the African-American community and LGBT community. Her writings can be found under "Mostly Teen Talk", "Duffy's Corner", and "Ebony's Topics".

=== Short stories ===
Shockley has also written many short stories, most of which center on issues surrounding homosexuality, being African-American, and being a woman. Through these short stories, Shockley sheds light on the conditions in which these people live and the impact these conditions have on their lives. These short stories include "Holly Craft Isn't Gay" (1980), "A Meeting of Sapphic Daughters" (Spring 1979), which can be found in The Black and White of It (1980), as well as "The Eternal Triangle" (1948), "The Curse of Kapa" (1951), and "Monday Will Be Better" (1964), posted in various outlets such as the Afro-American (Baltimore) and Negro Digest. Most of Shockley's short stories were controversial for their time.

=== Non-fiction ===
- A History of Public Library Services to Negroes in the South, 1900–1955 (1960)
- A Handbook for the Administration of Special Black Collections (1970)
- Living Black American Authors: A Biographical Directory (comp. and ed. with Sue P. Chandler) (1973)
- A Handbook of Black Librarianship (comp. and ed., with E. J. Josey) (1977)
- "The Black Lesbian in American Literature: An Overview", Home Girls: A Black Feminist Anthology (ed. Barbara Smith)(1983)
- Afro-American Women Writers, 1746–1933: An Anthology and Critical Guide (1988)

=== Fiction ===
- Not to Be Alone (unpublished novel) (1950)
- A World of Lonely Strangers (unpublished novel) (1950)
- Loving Her (1974)
- The Black and White of It (1980)
- Say Jesus and Come to Me (1982)
- Celebrating Hotchclaw (2005)

== Major themes in works ==
=== Racism, homophobia, and sexism ===
Throughout most of her writings, Shockey explores contemporary racism and the everyday struggles of being African-American. She often writes about LGBT+ women who are in the African-American community and facing triple oppression. In writing on these topics, Shockley hoped to make people in the African-American community realize their similarities as well as differences.

Shockley's first novel, Loving Her (1974), was the first of its kind as it worked to validate interracial lesbian love. It was also the first novel to use a female, same-gender-loving/lesbian, African-American protagonist. Through her character Renay, who leaves her abusive husband for a white, rich woman, Shockley explores what being an African American, female and homosexual is like in America in the twentieth century, whom she tries to "normalize".

In her collection of short stories, The Black and White of It, Shockley also stages an African-American lesbian as the main characters, using successful women who are professional and strong in nature face struggles with sexuality. In "Play It but Don't Say it", Shockley places a Congresswoman as her protagonist, and in "Holly Craft Isn't Gay", the character, a successful singer, goes as far as attempting to have a child in order to appear straight. Say Jesus and Come to Me works to also confront homophobia; however, it is largely critiquing the church, a theme not yet explored in Loving Her or The Black and White of It. Shockley's nonfiction works, such as her section in Home Girls: A Black Feminist Anthology edited by Barbara Smith, also addresses these same issues revolving around sexuality in the African-American community.

Celebrating Hotchclaw looks to historically Black colleges to explore power relationships and conflicts within Black communities, especially relating to financial hardship and corruption.

== Criticism ==
The Black and White of It (1980), although generally unknown, received better response from critics as well as her short story collection Say Jesus and Come to Me (1982). Say Jesus and Come to Me in particular was said to introduce and recognize a character that typically lacks representation and appeared on the Christopher Street best seller's list, however Shockley was still criticized for her writing style and lack of structure in the stories. The collection takes a focus on the character Reverend Black, a lesbian aged forty who tries to hide her sexuality. Shockley claimed to have written the piece in order to shed light on the black church's hypocrisy of shaming homosexuals yet partaking in all other acts deemed as sins.

Although recognized by authors such as Alice Walker, who gave Loving Her praise in her review of the novel in 1974 as well as Nellie McKay and Rita B. Dandridge who have acknowledged the writer, Shockley's fictional works has been often ignored by the masses if not criticized. Shockley herself attributes this lack of recognition due to the subject matter that she writes about. She claims that works addressing lesbian themes were rare at the time, as most publishers were not interested and writers were too fearful to admit to their own sexuality to push for publishing.

Shockley has been criticized for complicating and problemtizing same-gender loving through her characterizations of African-American people who also happen to be homosexual. Along with this, some argue that Shockley uses too many generalizations in her texts, has a poor stylistic choice, and did not work to battle common stereotypes about black lesbianism. In her first novel, Loving Her, the main character, Renay, chooses to live her life as a lesbian but still performs stereotypically heteronormative notions on romance, which works against Shockley's supposed intentions of exposing what a lesbian relationship really is like in the late twentieth-century. However, as the first novel representing an interracial relationship between two women, Loving Her does not exist within a historical framework it could serve as a satirical response to, and so has sometimes been interpreted as a naive reinforcement of heteronormative and racist ideas about queer relationships and black women, rather than a potentially self-aware piece. Nonetheless, the fictional novel is still one of the first of its kind.

== See also ==
- Black Lesbian Literature
- Lesbian Literature
