= Friends for Lesbian, Gay, Bisexual, Transgender, and Queer Concerns =

Friends for Lesbian, Gay, Bisexual, Transgender, and Queer Concerns (FLGBTQC) is a faith community within the Religious Society of Friends in the US.

== Purpose ==
From a minute approved in 1999, FLGBTQC states:

We seek to know that of God within ourselves and others. We seek to express God's truth in the Quaker and in the lesbian/gay/bisexual/transsexual/transgender communities, as it is made known to us. It is our hope to offer an oasis to those who have been spurned by the world at large. We are learning that radical inclusion and radical love bring further light to Quaker testimony and life. Our experience with oppression in our own lives leads us to seek ways to bring our witness to bear in the struggles of other oppressed peoples.

FLGBTQC publishes a semi-annual newsletter, which is received by 1,500 individuals and Quaker Meetings worldwide.

The group maintains a collection of Marriage Minutes by Quaker Meetings regarding same-sex marriage. FLGBTQC has also sponsored the publication of Each of Us Inevitable (ISBN 1199-01161-4), a collection of talks about coming to terms with one's identity and direction.

== Membership ==
FLGBTQC holds twice-yearly Gatherings, one in February and one in July at the Friends General Conference Annual Gathering of Friends. Most participants live in the United States, which is where all of the February Gatherings (and all but one of the July ones) have been held for over twenty-five years.

== History ==
FLGBTQC's origin comes from groups founded in the 1970s, when gay and lesbian Friends were first becoming visible in North American Quakerism. Initially, these Friends founded a group called Friends Committee for Concern. The group has since changed its name three times: first, to "Friends Committee on Gay Concerns" (FCGC), then to "Friends for Lesbian and Gay Concerns" (FLGC), and most recently, to "Friends for Lesbian, Gay, Bisexual, Transgender, and Queer Concerns" (FLGBTQC). This most recent name change occurred at the Gathering in February 2003, at Ghost Ranch, in New Mexico.

== See also ==
- LGBT-welcoming church programs
