= Spiritual literature =

Spiritual literature is a genre of literature that seeks to explore themes of the connection between people and the divine. The genre may include a variety of formats such as autobiography, poetry, story or prose to express complex spiritual ideas.

The portrayal of spiritual literature may draw on various metaphors, with that of journey being particularly prevalent. Dante Alighieri's Inferno, John Bunyan's Pilgrim's Progress, and even J.R.R Tolkien's Lord of the Rings and noteworthy examples of the story of a journey serving as illustrative of the protagonist's quest to find deeper spiritual truth and personal transformation.

The breadth of spiritual topics explored can be vast and may vary according to the religious world view of the author. Topics include finding spiritual enlightenment, living an ethical life, the nature of death and connection with the divine.

== Famous spiritual literature ==
- Confessions by Augustine
- The Imitation of Christ by Thomas à Kempis
- Vägmärken (Markings) by Dag Hammarskjöld (1963)
- Old Path White Clouds: Walking in the Footsteps of the Buddha by Thích Nhất Hạnh (1991)
- The Seven Storey Mountain by Thomas Merton (1948)
