= Michiyo Fukaya =

American poet

Michiyo Fukaya (25 April 1953 – 9 July 1987), also known as Michiyo Cornell, was an American feminist poet and activist whose work played an important part in the lesbian and Asian American communities. In 1979, Fukaya gave a speech entitled "Living in Asian America: An Asian American Lesbian's Address Before the Washington Monument" at the First National Third World Lesbian and Gay Conference. Drawing a parallel between the oppression of men and women in Third World countries to the oppression experienced by lesbian and gay Asian Americans, she acknowledged they both stemmed from white racism. Fukaya called attention to both racism in the lesbian and gay movement as well as heterosexism in the growing Asian American community. Fukaya's writing appeared in publications such as Azalea: A Magazine by Third World Lesbians. Her poetry and prose is collected in A Fire Is Burning, It Is In Me: The Life and Writing of Michiyo Fukaya.

Michiyo suffered from depression for a significant part of her life and had a difficult time living as an Asian-American lesbian and single mother in Vermont. As a result, she committed suicide with a gunshot wound to the head on 9 July 1987 at only 34 years of age.
