= Alma R. Gomez =

Painter and art professor

Alma R. Gómez (1957) is a painter and art professor at Boise State University.

== Biography ==
Gómez was born in Seagraves, Texas. In 1983, she earned a Bachelor of Fine Arts degree from Pan American University in Edinburg, Texas and in 1989 began graduate school at Boise State University in Idaho where she earned a Master of Arts in art education in 1991 and a Master of Fine Arts in painting and drawing in 2001. She teaches art at Boise State University.

== Art ==
Her 2000 acrylic on canvas painting titled El Sagrado Corazon (The Sacred Heart) was featured on page 92 in Chicano Art for Our Millennium edited by Gary D. Keller, Mary Erickson and Pat Villeneuve, published by Bilingual Press in 2004.

Gómez's art has been featured on the cover of two books by Richard Baker titled Los Dos Mundos, Another America in 1995 and Mexican American Students in 1999.

In 2001, Gómez published two essays on Chicano art.
