= Anita Cornwell =

American lesbian feminist author (1923–2023)

- Anita Cornwell in 1987
- Born: September 23, 1923; Greenwood, South Carolina, U.S.
- Died: May 27, 2023 (aged 99); Germantown, Philadelphia, Pennsylvania, U.S.
- Notable work: Black Lesbian in White America (1983)

Anita Cornwell (September 23, 1923 – May 27, 2023) was an American lesbian feminist author. In 1983, she wrote the first collection of essays by an African-American lesbian, Black Lesbian in White America.

== Biography ==
Born on September 23, 1923, in Greenwood, South Carolina, Cornwell moved to Pennsylvania at the age of 16, living first in Yeadon with her aunt, then in Philadelphia with her mother, who moved north when Cornwell was aged 18. Cornwell has one sibling, an older brother. She graduated from Temple University with a B.S. in journalism and the social sciences in 1948. She worked as a journalist for local newspapers The Philadelphia Tribune and The Philadelphia Evening Bulletin. She was also a clerical worker for private companies and government agencies, such as the Philadelphia Department of Public Assistance.

Cornwell's early writings, published in The Ladder and The Negro Digest in the 1950s, were among the first to identify the author as a black lesbian. Other publications where her work has appeared include Feminist Review, Labyrinth, National Leader, the Los Angeles Free Press, Azalea: a Magazine for Third World Lesbians, and BLACK/OUT (published in Philadelphia by the poet Joe Beam).

She was a member of the Daughters of Bilitis, and was a founding member of the Philadelphia chapter of Radicalesbians, a progressive activist group for lesbians.

Published on October 1, 1983, Cornwell's first book Black Lesbian in White America, which includes her essays and an interview with activist Audre Lorde, is widely noted as the first collection of essays by a black lesbian. The book's foreword was written by fellow Philadelphia-based African-American lesbian writer Becky Birtha, who details Cornwell's acute analysis of the racial, sexual and gender oppression faced by lesbians and how to address their internalized homophobia and sexism.

Cornwell interviewed various prominent Black women writers, such as Pat Parker, Barbara Smith, and Audre Lorde. Her writing was mostly unpublished as she received a number of rejection letters from publishing houses, stating that her work did not match the publications' purported image. Cornwell's writings explored the concepts of intersectionality and misogynoir, long before those terms appeared in the literary and social lexicon.

Cornwell frequented the University of Pennsylvania Women's Center, and often read her works on that campus, at the William Way LGBT Community Center, Giovanni's Room, and other local venues in Philadelphia.

She was honored by the Annual Lambda Literary Festival, which was held in Philadelphia in 2000.

In her later years, Cornwell suffered from dementia. She died on May 27, 2023, at the age of 99.

== Bibliography ==
- Black Lesbian in White America (essays, Naiad Press, 1983)
- The Girls of Summer (young-adult novel, 1989)
