= Kitchen Table: Women of Color Press =

Activist feminist press

Kitchen Table: Women of Color Press was an activist feminist press, closely related to the National Black Feminist Organization (NBFO), that was started in 1980 by Barbara Smith, Beverly Smith, Cherríe Moraga, and poet Audre Lorde. Beverly Smith and Barbara Smith, and their associate Demita Frazier, had together cofounded the Combahee River Collective (CRC). The Kitchen Table became inactive soon after Audre Lorde's death in 1992. The motivation for starting a press run by and for women of color was that "as feminist and lesbian of color writers, we knew that we had no options for getting published, except at the mercy or whim of others, whether in the context of alternative or commercial publishing, since both are white-dominated."

== Background ==
In the early 1970s, Barbara Smith was teaching courses about black women writers at Emerson College. However, she found that the books she required for her courses were often out of print and it was difficult to obtain specific novels. She has said that, "That was because nobody cared if Zora Neale Hurston's Their Eyes Were Watching God or Ann Petry's The Street was available. People did not care because they were considered to be marginal and unimportant writers."

Another main factor that ultimately led to the development of Kitchen Table was the racism within the mainstream women's movement during the late 1970s and early 1980s. As a result, women of color decided to come up with their own alternative.

== Beginnings ==
In her essay "A Press of our Own: Kitchen Table: Women of Color Press", founder Barbara Smith describes the beginnings of the press this way: "In October 1980, Audre Lorde said to me during a phone conversation, 'We really need to do something about publishing.'" Smith recounts how "it was at that meeting that Kitchen Table: Women of Color Press was born. We did not arrive at a name or announce our existence until a year later, but at that initial meeting we did decide to be a publisher for all women of color." In an interview with Joseph F. Beam in Blacklight Magazine, Lorde spoke to the need to "develop those structures (like Kitchen Table) that will present and circulate our culture." As a result of Lorde's suggestion, Smith assembled a group for a meeting on Halloween weekend in Boston, the home city of the press in its first year.

In 1981, Smith relocated the press to New York City after leaving the University of Massachusetts at Boston. However, on most of the press's publications, Latham, New York, near Albany, is listed as the place of publication. Smith, Lorde, Cherríe Moraga, Hattie Gossett, Helena Byard, Susan Yung, Ana Oliveira, Rosío Alvarez, Alma Gomez and Leota Lone Dog are all considered co-founders of the organization. Smith explained the name of the press as "the kitchen is the center of the home, the place where women in particular work and communicate with each other." The imagery of the kitchen table refers to the organization's grassroots function.

== Goals ==
The group decided that they would publish books aimed at promoting the writing of women of color of all racial/ethnic heritages, national origins, ages, socioeconomic classes, and sexual orientations. The target audience of the press was "not solely women of color or lesbians of color, but the entire gamut of our communities." The project resulted in the world's first publishing company run autonomously by women of color. Smith describes this as "one of (the group's) bravest steps", as "most people of color have chosen to work in their separate groups when they do media or other projects." The organization was founded on examining the specific situations and issues that women of color face.

By being able to publish and promote the writing of women of color, Kitchen Table would ideally serve to allow women of color to control a significant means of communication, which would in turn allow for the foundation of practical social and political change. "Until this society completely transforms itself, and justice for all people prevails," wrote Barbara Smith, "there will undoubtedly be a need for Kitchen Table: Women of Color Press."

In addition to publishing books, Kitchen Table: Women of Color Press was an activist and advocacy organization devoted to the liberation struggles of all oppressed people. The group was very influential in the works of many writers; tatiana de la tierra, a Latina lesbian author and publisher, was inspired by the goals of Kitchen Table: Women of Color Press and her work reflected the group's influence. In de la tierra's Latina lesbian magazine, Esto no tiene nombre, she published the works of many female writers of color like Cherríe Moraga, Achy Obejas, and Luz María Umpierre.

Among the first three publications of Kitchen Table: Women of Color Press included three significant anthologies of literary works still highly regarded: Alma Gómez and Cherríe Moraga's Cuentos: Stories by Latinas (1983); Cherríe Moraga and Gloria Anzaldúa's This Bridge Called My Back: Writings by Radical Women of Color (1984, 2nd edn; originally published by Persephone Press in 1981); and Barbara Smith's Home Girls: A Black Feminist Anthology (1983; reprinted by Rutgers University Press, 2000).

In order to reach a larger audience, Kitchen Table Press brought their books to concerts, book fairs, conferences and readings and made a special attempt to attend events like the Asian/Pacific American Heritage Festival in New York, the Latin American Book Fair and the convention of the College Language Association, as well as events that were specifically for women of color.

Kitchen Table was also conscious of the graphic presentation of their books and the images that were used on the covers and throughout the books. Smith has written, "We are all too aware of the inaccurate and denigrating images of women of color and people of color, generally, in all aspects of media." Kitchen Table decided to use traditional graphics from indigenous African, Asian, Latino and Indian cultures in the cover and text illustrations of their books. Smith argues that Kitchen Table's graphic design in turn influenced other book designs by and about women of color.

== Titles ==
Some of Kitchen Table's most popular titles include: 1984 anthology by Cherríe Moraga and Gloria Anzaldúa titled This Bridge Called My Back: Writings by Radical Women of Color and Barbara Smith's Home Girls: A Black Feminist Anthology, first published in 1984. Audre Lorde's I Am Your Sister: Black Women Organizing Across Sexualities was also published by the press in 1986. An additional publication that the press printed in Alma Gómez and Cherríe Moraga's Cuentos: Stories by Latinas in 1983. By 1983 the press was also distributing more than 100 titles by women of color from other independent presses.

"In addition to these books, in 1986, Kitchen Table: Women of Color Press published its Freedom Organizing Pamphlet Series, which included the Combahee River Collective's The Combahee River Collective Statement: Black Feminist Organizing in the Seventies and Eighties. Audre Lorde and Merle Woo's Apartheid U.S.A. / Freedom Organizing in the Eighties, Audre Lorde's I Am Your Sister: Black Women Organizing Across Sexualities (No. 3), Barbara Omolade's It's a Family Affair: The Real Lives of Black Single Mothers (No. 4), Angela Y. Davis's Violence Against Women and the Ongoing Challenge to Racism (No. 5), and Merle Woo's Our Common Enemy, Our Common Cause: Freedom Organizing in the Eighties."

== Impact and legacy ==
Kitchen Table functioned as a press and a resource network for women of color worldwide. The company faced incredible pressure to deal with tokenism while operating as the only publishing company run autonomously by women of color.

While admitting that she was at first hesitant to combine cultural and ideological work with grassroots organizing and activism by founding Kitchen Table, in 1989 Smith acknowledged that she believed Kitchen Table had played an important role in making political change. Smith has said that if Kitchen Table and other independent feminist presses did not exist, the writings of lesbians of color would be virtually unavailable, since at the time commercial publishers did not publish women of color who openly identified as lesbian: "Our commitment to publishing feminist and lesbian writing has sometimes made our relations with our communities difficult and even painful, but the longer the press has existed, the easier it has become to get an intelligent and open response to this work, and we have been met with increasing interest and understanding."

Jaime M. Grant, in her 1996 essay "Building Community-Based Coalitions from Academe: The Union Institute and the Kitchen Table: Women of Color Press Transition Coalition," remarked that works published by the press have "literally transformed the conversation on racism, sexism, and homophobia in the classroom in the last decade." After Lorde's death, Barbara Smith became more politically active, later becoming a member of the city council in Albany, New York.

Kitchen Table has inspired other feminist publishing companies, such as BrokenBeautiful Press, founded by the academic and writer Alexis Pauline Gumbs in 2012.

In a 2018 interview with Shondaland, Smith said that she believes Kitchen Table was a catalyst for "getting the work out and asserting that this work is of great value."

== See also ==
- Black lesbian literature in the United States
- Womanism
- Lesbian-feminism
- Feminist Press
- Black Classic Press
- South End Press
