= Home Girls =

1983 Black feminist anthology

Home Girls: A Black Feminist Anthology
- Language: English
- Published: 1983
- Publisher: Kitchen Table: Women of Color Press
- Pages: 364
- ISBN: 9780813527536
- OCLC: 1254080356

Home Girls: A Black Feminist Anthology (1983) is a collection of Black lesbian and Black feminist essays, edited by Barbara Smith. The anthology includes different accounts from 32 black women of feminist ideology who come from a variety of different areas, cultures, and classes. This collection of writings is intended to showcase the similarities among black women from different walks of life. In the introduction, Smith states her belief that "Black feminism is, on every level, organic to Black experience." Writings within Home Girls support this belief through essays that exemplify black women's struggles and lived experiences within their race, gender, sexual orientation, culture, and home life. Topics and stories discussed in the writings often touch on subjects that in the past have been deemed taboo, provocative, and profound.

== History ==
The book grew out of Conditions magazine's November 1979 issue, "Conditions 5: the Black Women's Issue", originally edited by Barbara Smith and Lorraine Bethel. Conditions 5 was "the first widely distributed collection of Black feminist writing in the U.S." The anthology was first published in 1983 by Kitchen Table: Women of Color Press, and was reissued by Rutgers University Press in 2000. Where necessary, the 2000 issue contained updates of the contributor's biographies as well as a new preface. The current preface evaluates how the lives of black women have changed since the original book was released. Smith's main concern was in regards to how black women were positively contributing to black feminism. Since its initial release, Home Girls "has become an essential text on Black women's lives and writings."

== Topics discussed ==
Black feminism stems from the idea that women's experiences are intersectional and a reflection of race, sexism, gender oppression, and class. Within the anthology, black women authors take many different approaches to address the issues that arise from their identities and express their support for black feminist organizations. Since its original release there have been numerous events and organizations that work towards building black feminism.

Sexuality is another topic brought up in many of the pieces throughout Home Girls. Black women share their discoveries as well as stories about what it means to be a part of the LGBTQ+ community and how that has shaped them. In the preface, Smith acknowledges black lesbians and their activity within The Ad Hoc Committee "for an open process, the grass-roots groups that have successfully questioned the undemocratic... tactics of the proposed gay millennium march in Washington D.C in 2000." Many of the organizations and marches that came to be before and after the publication of Home Girls are centralized around issues of racial inequality and gender oppression.

The struggle black women face with sexual orientation is suggested in many of the contributor's pieces. Things such as physical appearance, clothes, mannerisms, and makeup affected the way these women were perceived and sexualized throughout their lives. In Home Girls many of the women reveal their personal stories and accounts of sexual abuse and the continuous sexualization they received. Audre Lorde addresses this and mentions "Clothes were often the most important way of broadcasting one's chosen sexual role."

In relation to sexual orientation many of the writings in Home Girls contain personal stories about their LBGT experiences and reactions from community members and reactions from the LGBT community. Cheryl Clarke is one of the black feministolor Pre contributors to addresses homophobia within the black community. In her writing, she shares the struggles of LGBT in black communities and the fear they often have to live with.

Together, the topics presented in this anthology exemplify intersectionality, the idea that multiple oppressions can be suffered together and mold a person's idea of their oppression. A feminist goal is to expand its diversity and inclusiveness. In order to achieve this goal, many activists suggest becoming more knowledgeable about intersectional feminism and its effects on how black women experience oppression and discrimination.

== Audience response ==
Critical reception for Home Girls has been largely positive. One reviewer for the Black American Literature Forum praises the book for its sense of unity and black feminist perspective. As the article states: "While many of the book's poems strike me as self-indulgent and forced, the majority of the selections are both finely honed and provocative. Herein lies the strength of Home Girls. It consciously broaches issues which have heretofore been given only a faint hearing and thus challenges the reader to rethink not only the past and present but also the future."

== Contributors ==
- Cheryl L. Clarke
- Michelle Cliff
- Barbara Smith
- Bernice Johnson Reagon
- Jewelle Gomez
- June Jordan
- Alice Walker
- Audre Lorde
- Luisah Teish
- Toi Derricotte
- Chirlane McCray
- Becky Birtha
- Tania Abdulahad
- Donna Allegra
- Barbara A. Banks
- Julie Carter
- Michelle T. Clinton
- Willie M. Coleman
- Alexis De Veaux
- Akasha (Gloria) Hull
- Patricia Jones
- Raymina Y. Mays
- Deidre McCalla
- Pat Parker
- Linda C. Powel
- Spring Redd
- Gwendolyn Rogers
- Kate Rushin
- Ann Allen Shockley
- Beverly Smith
- Shirley O. Steele
- Jameelah Waheed
- Renita Weems

== See also ==
- Lesbianism
- Black feminism
- Womanism
- Critical social theory
- African-American literature
- This Bridge Called My Back: Writings by Radical Women of Color
- Daughters of Africa
