= Cheryl Clarke =

American lesbian writer, educator and activist (born 1947)

- Born: Cheryl Lynn Clarke; May 16, 1947 (age 79); Washington, D.C., U.S.
- Education: Howard University (BA); Rutgers University, New Brunswick (MA, MSW, PhD)
- Occupations: Poet, essayist, educator and community activist
- Years active: 1940s–present
- Spouse: Barbara Balliet
- Relatives: Breena Clarke (sister)

Cheryl Lynn Clarke (born Washington D.C., May 16, 1947) is an American lesbian poet, essayist, educator, and Black feminist community activist. Her scholarship focuses on African-American women's literature, black lesbian feminism, and the Black Arts Movement in the United States.

For more than 40 years, Clarke was founding Director of Diverse Community Affairs and Lesbian/Gay Concerns, later the Office of Social Justice Education and LBT Communities, at Rutgers University. She maintains a teaching affiliation with the Graduate Faculty of the Department of Women and Gender Studies, though retired. In addition, Clarke serves on the board of the Newark Pride Alliance.

== Early life and education ==
The daughter of James Sheridan Clarke, a World War II veteran, and Edna Clarke, Cheryl Clarke was born and raised in Washington, D.C. Clarke's parents were government workers and she was raised Catholic.

When she was 13 years old, Clarke crossed a picket line of African-American activists protesting segregation at Woolworth's on 14th Street. When she came home, her mother, a staunch union member, told her never to cross a picket line again, educating her about the role of direct action in the civil rights movement. At 16, Clarke was allowed by her parents to attend the 1963 March on Washington for Jobs and Freedom with them. The day before the march, on her way downtown to acquire information about the route, she encountered Martin Luther King Jr., who would deliver his "I Have a Dream" speech the next day.

Clarke attended parochial schools in the District of Columbia, and graduated from Howard University with a B.A. degree in English literature in 1969. Subsequently, she enrolled at Rutgers University, completing a Master of Arts in 1974, a Master of Social Work in 1980, and a PhD in 2000. For much of this time, she also worked for Rutgers, beginning her employment there in 1970 in the Urban University Program. In 1992, she was the founding Director of Diverse Community Affairs and Lesbian/Gay Concerns, which later became the Office for Social Justice Education and LGBT Communities. She served as the dean of students of the Livingston Campus at Rutgers University from 2010 to 2013, when she retired.

== Writing ==
Clarke is the author of five collections of poetry: Narratives: Poems in the Tradition of Black Women (originally self-published in 1981 and distributed by Kitchen Table: Women of Color Press in 1982); for Firebrand Books, Living as a Lesbian (1986), Humid Pitch (1989), and Experimental Love (1993); and for Word Works, By My Precise Haircut (2016). She also published After Mecca — Women Poets and the Black Arts Movement (Rutgers University Press, 2005), and Days of Good Looks: Prose and Poetry, 1980–2005 (Carroll & Graf Publishing, 2006), a collection that represented 25 years of published writing.

Clarke served on the editorial collective of Conditions, an early lesbian publication, and has been published in numerous anthologies, journals, magazines, and newspapers, including Conditions, This Bridge Called My Back, Home Girls, The Black Scholar, The Kenyon Review, Belles Lettres, and Gay Community News. Clarke's articles, "Lesbianism: An Act of Resistance" and "The Failure to Transform: Homophobia in the Black Community", published in This Bridge Called My Back and Home Girls, respectively, are often included in women's studies, Black studies, and English studies curricula.

=== "Lesbianism: an Act of Resistance" (1981) ===
Cheryl Clarke is the author of "Lesbianism: an Act of Resistance", originally published in 1981 in the feminist anthology This Bridge Called My Back: Writings by Radical Women of Color. The essay's main intervention is to expand the categories of who counts as a lesbian and what lesbianism is. Rather than defining a lesbian only as a woman who has sex with other women, Clarke insists that "there is no one kind of lesbian, no one kind of lesbian behavior, and no one kind of lesbian relationship." Thinking of "lesbian" as a continuum, she makes space for women who have sexual and emotional relationships with women but identify with other labels. In the same way, she redefines lesbianism "as an ideological, political, and philosophical means of liberation of all women from heterosexual tyranny." Because she imagines lesbianism to be in opposition to male tyranny and coerced heterosexuality, she defines it as resistance, no matter how a woman is actually practicing it in her personal life.

=== "The Failure to Transform: Homophobia in the Black Community" (1983) ===
The 1983 book Home Girls: A Black Feminist Anthology includes one of Clarke's essays, titled "The Failure to Transform: Homophobia in the Black Community". This essay is a literature critique, including critiques of LeRoi Jones's Preface to a Twenty Volume Suicide Note (1961), Michele Wallace's Black Macho and the Myth of the Superwoman (1979), and bell hooks' Ain't I a Woman (1981). Clarke argues that homophobia is not unique to the Black community, but is indicative of a larger homophobic culture. This piece is directed at Black men, who Clarke says perpetuate homophobia and the white supremacist, anti-Black concepts of gender and sexuality as a means of becoming more palatable to white America. She specifically critiques the "intellectual Black man" for acting as the savior that will bring liberation to the Black community by way of perpetuating homophobia to condemn Black lesbians as detrimental to the Black Family and Black nationhood. Additionally, Clarke asserts that intellectual Black women have excluded Black lesbians from their scholarship and subtly deny the womanhood of Black lesbians—"homophobia by omission". The oppression and exclusion of Black lesbian women from the Black liberation movement, according to Clarke, is counter-revolutionary and only by addressing and eliminating homophobia can the Black community find liberation.

Clarke concludes that Black people must be committed to eliminating homophobia in the community by engaging in discussion with advocates for gay and lesbian liberation, getting educated about gay and lesbian politics, confronting internal and external homophobic attitudes, and understanding how these attitudes prevent total liberation.

=== The Black Arts Movement ===
The Black Arts Movement took place between 1965 and 1975, in close connection with the Black power movement, and sought to reimagine Western politics and cultural aesthetics. Emerging from this movement was also the inclusion of women as well as queer artists, partially a result of critiques of the movement and prominent figures, including Clarke, highlighting the artistic contributions of these groups. In her work After Mecca, Clarke showcases women poets and writers and put queer characters at the center of her revolutionary fiction stories. Like the Black Arts Movement, much of Clarke's work in literature and in activism revolves around the idea of visibility, but with more engagement with queer Black womanhood.

== Community ==
Clarke has served on a number of boards and community organizations, including New York Women Against Rape (1985), New Jersey Women and AIDS Network, Center for Lesbian and Gay Studies at the CUNY Graduate Center, and the Astraea Lesbian Foundation for Justice. She is a member of the Board of Directors of the Newark Pride Alliance, a nonprofit organization dedicated to LGBTQ advocacy and programming in Newark.

Clarke lives in Jersey City, New Jersey. With her life partner, Barbara Balliet, she is co-owner of Bleinheim Hill Books, a bookstore in Hobart, New York.

=== Hobart Festival of Women Writers ===
The Hobart Festival of Women Writers was founded in 2013 by Clarke and her sister Breena Clarke, centering on published women writers. Each September, this organization offers reading and writing workshops, art exhibitions, and discussion panels.

== Works ==
- Narratives: Poems in the Tradition of Black Women (1983)
- Living as a Lesbian (1986)
- Humid Pitch (1989)
- Experimental Love (1993)
- By My Precise Haircut (2016)
- Clarke, Cheryl (August 15, 2024). Archive of Style. Evanston, Illinois: Triquarterly Books. ISBN 978-0-8101-4760-7.
