= Jewelle Gomez =

American author, poet, critic and playwright (born 1948)

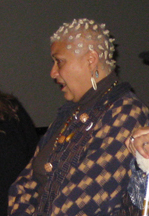
- Gomez in 2008
- Born: Jewelle Lydia Gomez; September 11, 1948 (age 78); Boston, Massachusetts, U.S.
- Education: Northeastern University; Columbia Graduate School of Journalism
- Occupations: Writer, critic
- Notable work: The Gilda Stories
- Spouse(s): Diane Sabin, m. 2008
- Awards: Lambda Literary Award; Bram Stoker Award for Lifetime Achievement
- Website: http://www.jewellegomez.com

Jewelle Lydia Gomez (born September 11, 1948) is an American author, poet, critic and playwright. She lived in New York City for 22 years, working in public television, theater, as well as philanthropy, before relocating to the West Coast. Her writing—fiction, poetry, essays and cultural criticism—has appeared in a wide variety of outlets, both feminist and mainstream. Her work centers on women's experiences, particularly those of LGBTQ women of color. She has been interviewed for several documentaries focused on LGBT rights and culture.

== Biography ==
Jewelle Gomez was born on September 11, 1948, in Boston, Massachusetts, to Dolores Minor LeClaire, a nurse, and John Gomez, a bartender. Her parents separated when she was 2, and Gomez was sent to Washington, D.C. to live with her paternal grandmother. From the age of 8, Gomez was raised in Boston by her maternal great-grandmother, Grace, who was born on Native land in Iowa to an African-American mother and Ioway father. Grace was married to John E. Morandus, who was half-Black and half-Wampanoag and a great-nephew of Massasoit.

Growing up in Boston in the 1950s and 1960s, Gomez was shaped socially and politically by the close family ties with her great-grandmother, Grace, and grandmother Lydia. They are referenced throughout her work, as in "Grace A." from the collection Don't Explain. As a child, Gomez experienced racial prejudice when visiting her mother, who had married a white cab driver and given birth to a white-passing son, in Pawtucket, Rhode Island; she also spent weekends with her father, who maintained two households with different women.

Gomez realized she was a lesbian at the age at 11, and had her first relationship with a classmate during her sophomore year at an all-girl's high school.

She began writing at a young age, and worked on the school newspaper during high school. She was also inspired by James Baldwin as a teenager after reading Another Country. Gomez received money from a Ford Foundation grant to apply to college, and attended Northeastern University on a full-ride scholarship. She graduated with a B.A. in 1971, majoring in sociology with a minor in theatre. She was involved in the student civil rights movement, editing the Black student newspaper and campaigning for an African American student union building.

In 1971, Gomez moved to New York City to work on the children's sketch comedy series, The Electric Company, produced by the Children's Television Workshop (now Sesame Workshop). After being fired from the show, she did freelance work before pursuing a master's degree in journalism at Columbia University.

She has also been involved in Black theater, including work with the Frank Silvera Writers' Workshop and years as a stage manager for off-Broadway productions.

== Writing ==
Describing herself as a possible "foremother of Afrofuturism," Gomez is the author of seven books, including the double Lambda Literary Award-winning novel The Gilda Stories (Firebrand Books, 1991). This novel has been in print since 1991 and reframes traditional vampire mythology by taking a lesbian feminist perspective; it is an adventure about an escaped slave who comes of age over two hundred years. According to scholar Elyce Rae Helford, "Each stage of Gilda's personal voyage is also a study of life as part of multiple communities, all at the margins of mainstream white middle-class America."

Gomez's work is associated with the international women in print movement, an effort by second-wave feminists to establish autonomous communications networks of feminist publications, presses, and bookstores created by and for women. She has credited feminist and lesbian publications with providing an outlet for her work in multiple interviews. At the first annual National Feminist Bookstore Week in 1995, Gomez signed a "feminist writer's pledge" attesting to the significance and value of the women in print movement, along with Alice Walker, Tee Corinne, Dorothy Allison, and Blanche McCrary Boyd.

She authored the theatrical adaptation of The Gilda Stories. Entitled Bones and Ash, the play began touring in 1996 and was performed in 13 U.S. cities by the Urban Bush Women Company. The 25th-anniversary edition of The Gilda Stories includes a new foreword written by Gomez as well as an afterword written by Alexis Pauline Gumbs.

Her other books include Don't Explain, a collection of short fiction; 43 Septembers, a collection of personal/political essays; and Oral Tradition: Selected Poems Old and New. Each of these collections feature Gomez' episodic approach, which John Howard has argued is a means of demonstrating the "linkages between current-day freedom struggles and the social/ political movements of prior generations."

Her fiction and poetry is included in more than a hundred anthologies, including the first anthology of Black speculative fiction, Dark Matter: A Century of Speculative Fiction from the African Diaspora (2000) edited by Sheree R. Thomas; Home Girls: A Black Feminist Anthology from Kitchen Table: Women of Color Press, Daughters of Africa edited by Margaret Busby (1992), and The Best American Poetry of 2001, edited by Robert Hass.

Gomez has written literary and film criticism for numerous publications including The Village Voice, the San Francisco Chronicle, Ms. and The Black Scholar. She particularly praises The Village Voice for helping her to develop as a writer.

Over the past 25 years she has been frequently interviewed in periodicals and journals, including a September 1993 Advocate article where writer Victoria Brownworth discussed her writing origins and political interests. In the Journal of Lesbian Studies (Vol. 5, No. 3) Gomez was interviewed for a special issue entitled "Funding Lesbian Activism". This interview linked her career in philanthropy with her political roots. She was also interviewed for the 1999 film After Stonewall.

Gomez has also written a comic novel, Televised, recounting the lives of survivors of the Black Nationalist movement, which was excerpted in the 2002 anthology Gumbo, edited by Marita Golden and E. Lynn Harris.

She authored a play about James Baldwin, Waiting For Giovanni, in 2010, in collaboration with Harry Waters Jr., an actor and professor in the theatre department at Macalester College. Readings have been held in San Francisco at Intersection for the Arts at a seminar on Baldwin at Carleton College in Northfield, Minn., at the Yellow Springs Writers Workshop in Ohio, AfroSolo Festival and the 2009 National Black Theatre Festival. Gomez and Waters were interviewed on the public radio program Fresh Fruit on KFAI by host Dixie Trechel in 2008. The segment also includes two short readings from the script. Gomez wrote the play Leaving the Blues, about singer Alberta Hunter, which premiered in 2017 at San Francisco's New Conservatory Theatre Center.

Both Waiting for Giovanni and Leaving the Blues have been produced by TOSOS Theatre Company in New York City. Leaving the Blues received a 2020 Audelco Award nomination for Best Play and won awards for Lead Actress in a Play (Rosalind Brown) and Featured Actor in a Play (Benjamin Mapp).

Gomez contributed to Radical Hope: Letters of Love and Dissent in Dangerous Times, edited by Carolina De Robertis and published by Vintage Books in 2017. In Radical Hope, her letter, "Not a Moment but a Movement", is a tribute to her maternal great-grandmother, whom she calls "Grace A." In May 2017, Gomez, along with other contributors, read her work at the book launch party for Radical Hope at Laurel Bookstore in Oakland.

Gomez's play Unpacking in Ptown, the third in the trilogy "Words and Music" premiered at New Conservatory Theatre Center in San Francisco in March 2024.

== Activism ==
Gomez' activism on behalf of LGBTQ rights is "grounded in the history of race and gender in America." In "The Marches," an essay in Don't Explain, she writes, "[N]o one of us should feel we can leave someone behind in the struggle for liberation."

Gomez was on the original staff of Say Brother (now Basic Black), one of the first weekly Black television shows (WGBH-TV Boston, 1968), and worked there from 1968 to 1971. She was also on the founding board of the Gay and Lesbian Alliance Against Defamation (GLAAD) in 1984.

She also served on the early boards of the Astraea Lesbian Foundation and the Open Meadows Foundation, both devoted to funding women's organizations and activities. She's been a member of the board of the Cornell University Human Sexuality Archives and the endowment committee of the James Hormel LGBT Center of the main San Francisco Public Library. She was a member of the loose-knit philanthropic collective founded in San Francisco in 1998 called 100 Lesbians and Our Friends. The group, co-founded by Andrea Gillespie and Diane Sabin, was designed to educate lesbians who were culturally miseducated—as women—about the use of money and benefits of philanthropy. The philosophy of making "stretch gifts" (not reducing contributions already being made) to lesbian groups and projects raised more than $200,000 in two years.

She was a commencement speaker at the University of California Berkeley's Women and Gender Studies Commencement, the University of California at Los Angeles Queer Commencement, and acted as a keynote speaker twice for Gay Pride in New York City and as a host for Pride San Francisco.

She and her partner, Dr. Diane Sabin, were among the litigants against the state of California suing for the right to legal marriage. The case was brought to the courts by the City Attorney of San Francisco, the National Center for Lesbian Rights (NCLR) and the American Civil Liberties Union (ACLU). Gomez has written extensively about gay rights since the 1980s, including articles on equal marriage in Ms. Magazine and has been quoted extensively during the court case. In May 2008 the Supreme Court ruled in favor of the litigants, allowing marriage between same-sex couples in the state of California. Such ceremonies may legally begin after 30 days, allowing municipalities to make administrative changes. Gomez and Sabin were among 18,000 couples married in California before (Proposition 8), which banned further same-sex marriages in California, was approved by the voters on November 4, 2008.

Jewelle: A Just Vision, a documentary about Gomez's art and activism, was directed by award-winning filmmaker Madeleine Lim in 2022. The film has screened at multiple film festivals.

== Professional ==
Formerly the executive director of the Poetry Center and American Poetry Archives at San Francisco State University, she has also had a long career in philanthropy. She was the director of Cultural Equity Grants at the San Francisco Arts Commission and the director of the Literature Program for the New York State Council on the Arts.

She has presented lectures and taught at numerous institutions of higher learning including San Francisco State University, Hunter College, Rutgers University, New College of California, Grinnell College, San Diego City College, Ohio State University, and the University of Washington (Seattle). She is the former director of the Literature Program at the New York State Council on the Arts and of Cultural Equity Grants at the San Francisco Arts Commission. She also served as executive director of the Poetry Center and American Poetry Archives at San Francisco State University.

She is the former Director of Grants and Community Initiatives for Horizons Foundation, the oldest lesbian, gay, bisexual and transgender foundation in the US. She also formerly served as the President of the San Francisco Public Library Commission.

== Archives ==
The James C. Hormel Center LGBTQIA Center at the San Francisco Public Library holds a collection of Gomez's papers, including drafts of her writings, diaries, photographs, correspondence, and teaching materials. The Schomburg Center for Research in Black Culture at the New York Public Library also holds a smaller collection of Gomez's papers, including interviews and writings.

== Selected bibliography ==
- The Lipstick Papers (1980)
- Flamingos and Bears (Grace Publications, 1986)
- The Gilda Stories: A Novel (Firebrand Books, 1991)
- Forty-Three Septembers (Firebrand Books, 1993)
- Oral Tradition: Selected Poems Old and New (Firebrand Books, 1995)
- Swords of the Rainbow (Alyson Books, 1996, edited with Eric Garber)
- Don't Explain: Short Fiction (Firebrand Books, 1998)
- The Gilda Stories: Expanded 25th Anniversary Edition (City Lights Publishers, 2016)
