= List of biographical dictionaries of women writers in English =

There are a large and ever growing number of biographical dictionaries of women writers. These works reflect the emergence of women's literature as a flourishing field of academic study over the past few decades. The genre also draws on a much older literary tradition of biographical collections of exemplary women.

This list includes biobibliographical dictionaries, in which biographical detail is provided alongside bibliographical information.

== The dictionaries ==
- Adelaide, Debra. Australian Women Writers: a bibliographical guide. Pandora Press, 1988. ISBN 978-0-86358-148-9
- Bell, Maureen, et al., eds. A Biographical Dictionary of English Women Writers 1580–1720. Harvester Wheatsheaf, 1990.
- Benbow-Pfalzgraf, Taryn. American Women Writers: A Critical Reference Guide: From Colonial Times to the Present. 2nd ed. Detroit: St. James Press, 2000.
  - Contains biographical and critical essays on 1,328 American women writers
- Berney, K. A., et al., eds. Contemporary Women Dramatists. St. James Press, 1994.
- Blain, Virginia, et al., eds. The Feminist Companion to Literature in English. New Haven and London: Yale University Press, 1990. (Internet Archive)
  - entries for more than 2700 women writing in English (in various national traditions)
- Bloom, Abigail B. Nineteenth-century British Women Writers: a bio-bibliographical critical sourcebook. Westport, Conn.: Greenwood Press, 2000. ISBN 978-0-313-30439-2
  - entries for more than 90 British women writers of the nineteenth century
- Bloom, Harold, ed. British Women Fiction Writers of the 19th Century. New York: Chelsea House, 1998.
- Bloom, Harold, ed. Caribbean Women Writers. Chelsea House, 1997.
- Bomariot, Jessica, and Jeffrey W. Hunter, ed. Feminism in Literature: A Gale Critical Companion. 6 vols. Farmington Hills, MI: Thomson Gale, 2005.
  - Includes timelines and entries on individual authors: Vol. 1 from antiquity through the 18th century; vols 2–3 on the 19th century; and vols 4–6 on the 20th century.
- Buck, Claire, ed. The Bloomsbury Guide to Women's Literature. Prentice Hall, 1992. (Internet Archive)
  - see List of women in Bloomsbury Guide to Women's Literature
- Champion, Laurie, and Austin, Rhonda, eds. Contemporary American women fiction writers : an A-to-Z guide. Westport, Conn.: Greenwood Press, 2002.
  - entries for: Alice Adams, Julia Alvarez, Toni Cade Bambara, Andrea Barrett, Ann Beattie, Judy Blume, Rita Mae Brown, Ana Castillo, Denise Chavez, Alice Childress, Sandra Cisneros, J. California Cooper, Ellen Douglas (Josephine Ayres Haxton), Louise Erdrich, Mary Gaitskill, Kaye Gibbons, Gail Godwin, Mary Gordon, Elizabeth Forsythe Hailey, Shelby Hearon, Amy Hempel, Linda Hogan, Mary Hood, Josephine Humphreys, Gish Jen, Diane Johnson, Gayl Jones, Jamaica Kincaid, Nanci Kincaid, Barbara Kingsolver, Maxine (Ting Ting) Hong Kingston, Harper Lee, Ursula K. Le Guin, Beverly Lowry, Paule Marshall, Bobbie Ann Mason, Jill McCorkle, Elizabeth McCracken, Colleen Johnson McElroy, Terry McMillan, Toni Morrison, Gloria Naylor, Joyce Carol Oates, Tillie Olsen, Cynthia Ozick, Grace (Goodside) Paley, Sara Paretsky, Ann Petry, Jayne Anne Phillips, Francine Prose, Marilynne Robinson, Mary Robison, Leslie Marmon Silko, Jane Smiley, Lee Smith, Elizabeth Ann Tallent, Amy Tan, Melanie Rae Thon, Anne Tyler, Alice Walker, Joy Williams.
- Colman, Anne U. Dictionary of Nineteenth-Century Irish Women Poets. Kenny's Bookshop, 1996. Intended to complement Weekes Unveiling Treasures.
- Dagg, Anne Innis. The Feminine Gaze: a Canadian compendium of non-fiction women authors and their books, 1836–1945. Wilfrid Laurier University Press, 2001.
  - includes brief biographies of 473 writers
- Fister, Barbara, ed. Third World Women's Literatures: A Dictionary and Guide to Materials in English. Westport, CT: Greenwood Press, 1995.
  - Listings by country and region and alphabetical by author; includes bibliography of criticism.
- Gonzalez, Alexander G., ed. Irish Women Writers: an A-to-Z guide. Greenwood Press, 2006. ISBN 978-0-313-32883-1
  - 75 entries, by more than 35 contributors, on: Linda Anderson, Ivy Bannister, Mary Beckett, Sara Berkeley, Maeve Binchy, Caroline Blackwood, Eavan Boland, Angela Bourke, Elizabeth Bowen, Clare Boylan, Elizabeth Brennan, Frances Browne, Mary Rose Callaghan, Moya Cannon, Marina Carr, Juanita Casey, Mary (Catherine Gunning Maguire) Colum, Julia Crottie, Geraldine Cummins, Ita Daly, Suzanne Day, Teresa Deevy, Anne Devlin, Eilis Dillon, Emma Donoghue, Mary Dorcey, Ellen Mary Patrick Downing, Maria Edgeworth, Ruth Dudley Edwards, Anne Enright, Mary E. (Mary Blundell) Frances, Miriam Gallagher, Sarah Grand, Augusta, Lady Gregory, Anne Le Marquand Hartigan, Rita Ann Higgins, Norah Hoult, Jennifer Johnston, Biddy Jenkinson, Marie Jones, Molly Keane, Eva Kelly, Rita Kelly, Mary Lavin, Emily Lawless, Joan Lingard, Deirdre Madden, Joy Martin, Medbh Mcguckian, Janet McNeill, Paula Meehan, Maire Mhac an tSaoi, Alice Milligan, Susan L. Mitchell, Lady Morgan, Val Mulkerns, Iris Murdoch, Eilean Ni Chuilleanain, Nuala Ni Dhomhnaill, Eilis Ni Dhuibhne, Aine Ni Ghlinn, Mairead Ni Ghrada, Edna O'Brien, Kate O'Brien, Mary O'Donnell, Julia O'Faolain, Nuala O'Faolain, Mary O'Malley, Christina Reid, Somerville and Ross, Eithne Strong, Mary Tighe, Katharine Tynan, Lady Wilde, Sheila Wingfield
- Hammill, Faye, et al., eds. Encyclopedia of British Women's Writing, 1900–1950. Palgrave Macmillan, 2006.
- Harris, Sharon M., ed. American Women Prose Writers, 1870–1920. Dictionary of Literary Biography. Vol. v. 221. Detroit: Gale Group, 2000.
  - entries on: Octavia Albert / Phoebe Jackson, Mary Antin / Betty Bergland, Mary Austin / Linda K. Karell, Amelia Edith Huddleston Barr / Rose Norman, Lillie Devereux Blake / Grace Farrell, S. Alice Callahan / Annette Van Dyke, Kate McPhelim Cleary / Susanne George Bloomfield, Anna Julia Cooper / Jennifer A. Kohout, Mary Abigail Dodge (Gail Hamilton) / Annmarie Pinarski, Alice Morse Earle / Katharine Gillespie, Edith Maude Eaton (Sui Sin Far) / Nicole Tonkovich, Winnifred Eaton (Onoto Watanna) / Maureen Honey, Sarah Barnwell Elliott / Susan Neal Mayberry, Annie Adams Fields / Deborah M. Evans, Mary Hallock Foote / Victoria Lamont, Mary E. Wilkins Freeman / Marylynne Diggs, Charlotte Perkins Gilman / Robin Miskolcze, Emma Goldman / Priscilla Wald, Anna Katharine Green / Marie T. Farr, Susan Hale / Karen Dandurand, Frances Ellen Watkins Harper / Maggie Montesinos Sale, Constance Cary Harrison (Mrs. Burton Harrison) / Kathy Ryder, Mary Jane Holmes / Barbara J. McGuire, Alice James / Kristin Bourdeau, Sarah Orne Jewett / Melanie Kisthardt, Mrs. A. E. Johnson (Amelia Johnson) / Wendy Wagner, Emma Dunham Kelley / Barbara McCaskill, Lucy Larcom / Shirley Marchalonis, Laura Jean Libbey / Jean Carwile Masteller, Queen Lili'uokalani / Lydia Kualapai, Victoria Earle Matthews / Shirley Wilson Logan, María Cristina Mena (María Cristina Chambers) / E. Thomson Shields, Mourning Dove (Humishuma) / Alanna Kathleen Brown, Elizabeth Stuart Phelps / Mary Bortnyk Rigsby, Agnes Repplier / Paul Hansom, María Amparo Ruiz de Burton / José F. Aranda, Amanda Smith / Venetria K. Patton, Harriet Prescott Spofford / Jennifer Putzi, Gene Stratton-Porter / Anne K. Phillips, Suzie King Taylor / Joycelyn K. Moody, Ida B. Wells-Barnett / Stephanie Athey, Frances E. Willard / Mary Hurd, Martha Wolfenstein / Rosalind G. Benjet, Constance Fenimore Woolson / Sharon L. Dean, Anzia Yezierska / Julie Prebel.
- Horwitz, Barbara J. British Women Writers, 1700–1850: An Annotated Bibliography of Their Works and Works about Them. Lanham, MD: Scarecrow Press; Pasadena CA: Salem Press, 1997.
- Hudock, Amy E., and Rodier, Katharine, eds. American Women Prose Writers: 1820–1870. Gale Group, 2001.
  - entries for: Louisa May Alcott, Sarah G. Bagley, Mary Boykin Chesnut, Susan Fenimore Cooper, Mary Anne Cruse, Rebecca Harding Davis, Sarah Morgan Dawson, Silvia Dubois, Zilpha Elaw, Augusta Jane Evans, Harriet Farley, Charlotte L. Forten, Margaret Fuller, Sarah Moore Grimké, Sophia Peabody Hawthorne, Harriet Jacobs, Mary Jemison, Elizabeth Keckley, Sarah Petigru King, Susan Shelby Magoffin, Mary Peabody Mann, Katherine Sherwood Bonner McDowell (Sherwood Bonner), Maria Jane McIntosh, Lucretia Mott, Elizabeth Oakes Smith, Sara Payson Willis Parton (Fanny Fern), Ann Plato, Margaret Junkin Preston, Nancy Gardner Prince, Catharine Maria Sedgwick, Lydia Huntley Sigourney, E. D. E. N. Southworth, Maria W. Stewart, Lucy Stone, Harriet Beecher Stowe, Celia Laighton Thaxter, Sojourner Truth, Susan Warner (Elizabeth Wetherell), Emma Willard, Harriet Wilson.
- Kester-Shelton, Pamela. Feminist Writers. Detroit: St. James, 1996.
  - entries on almost 300 writers (mostly American or British), including biography, bibliography, and critical bibliography. An appendix provides a brief paragraph or identifying phrase for an additional 177 writers.
- Klein, Kathleen G., ed. Great Women Mystery Writers: classic to contemporary. Greenwood Press, 1994.
  - entries for: Catherine Aird, Margery Allingham/Maxwell March, Charlotte Armstrong/Jo Valentine, Margot Arnold, Marian Babson, Nikki Baker, Linda Barnes, J. S. Borthwick, Elisabeth Bowers, Mary Elizabeth Braddon/Babington White, Christianna Brand/Mary Ann Ashe/China Thompson, Lilian Jackson Braun, Gwendoline Butler/Jennie Melville, P. M. Carlson, Vera Caspary, Sarah Caudwell, Agatha Christie/Mary Westmacott, Mary Higgins Clark, Anna Clarke, Liza Cody, Susan Conant, Patricia Cornwell, Amanda Cross, Elizabeth Daly, Barbara D'Amato/Malacai Black, Dorothy Salisbury Davis, Doris Miles Disney, Susan Dunlap, Tony Fennelly, E. X. Ferrars, Leslie Ford/David Frome, Katherine V. Forrest, Antonia Fraser, Frances Fyfield/Frances Hegarty, Elizabeth George, B. M. Gill, Dorothy Gilman, E. X. Giroux/Doris Shannon, Paula Gosling/Ainslie Skinner, Sue Grafton, Linda Grant, Lesley Grant-Adamson, Anna Katharine Green, Martha Grimes, Carolyn G. Hart, S. T. Haymon, Joan Hess/Joan Hadley, Georgette Heyer, Patricia Highsmith, Dorothy B. Hughes, P. D. James, Lucille Kallen, Faye Kellerman, Susan Kelly, Susan Kenney, Karen Kijewski, Jane Langton, Emma Lathen/R. B. Dominic, Elizabeth Lemarchand, Elizabeth Linington/Anne Blaisdell/Dell Shannon/Lesley Egan, Marie Belloc Lowndes, Sharyn McCrumb, Val McDermid, Jill McGown/Elizabeth Chaplin, Charlotte MacLeod/Ailsa Craig, Claire McNab, Margaret Maron, Ngaio Marsh, Lia Matera, M. R. D. Meek, Annette Meyers/Maan Meyers, Margaret Millar, Gladys Mitchell/Malcolm Torrie, Gwen Moffat, Susan Moody, Anne Morice/Felicity Shaw, Patricia Moyes, Marcia Muller, Magdalen Nabb, Shizuko Natsuke, Lillian O'Donnell, Emmuska Orczy, Orania Papazoglou/Jane Haddam, Sara Paretsky, Barbara Paul, Anne Perry, Elizabeth Peters/Barbara Michaels, Ellis Peters/Jolyon Carr/John Redfern/Edith Pargeter, Nancy Pickard, Joyce Porter, Sheila Radley, Seeley Regester, Ruth Rendell/Barbara Vine, Craig Rice/Daphne Saunders/Michael Venning, Virginia Rich, Mary Roberts Rinehart, Dorothy L. Sayers, Sarah Shankman/Alice Storey, Dorothy Simpson, Gillian Slovo, Joan Smith, Julie Smith, Susannah Stacey, Dorothy Sucher, Phoebe Atwood Taylor/Alice Tilton/Freeman Dana, Josephine Tey/Gordon Daviot, June Thomson, Masako Togawa, Margaret Truman, Dorothy Uhnak, Patricia Wentworth, Barbara Wilson, Chris Wiltz, Mary Wings, Sara Woods/Anne Burton/Mary Challis/Margaret Leek, L. R. Wright, Margaret Yorke.
- Knight, Denise D., and Emmanuel S. Nelson. Nineteenth-Century American Women Writers: A Bio-Bibliographical Critical Sourcebook. Westport, Conn.: Greenwood Press, 1997.
- Lindsay, Elizabeth Blakesley. Great Women Mystery Writers - 2nd ed. Westport, Conn.:Greenwood Press, 2007
- Mainiero, Lina, American Women Writers: A Critical Reference Guide from Colonial Times to the Present. New York: Ungar, 1979.
- Mann, David, et al. Women Playwrights in England, Ireland, and Scotland, 1660–1823. Indiana University Press, 1996.
- Miller, Jane Eldridge, ed. Who's Who in Contemporary Women's Writing. Routledge, 2001.
  - entries on more than 400 writers whose careers began from the 1960s onwards
- Mulford, Carla, et al., eds. American Women Prose Writers to 1820. Detroit: Gale Research, 1999.
  - entries on: Abigail Adams, Hannah Adams, Susanna Anthony, Elizabeth Ashbridge, Abigail Abbot Bailey, Martha Moore Ballard, Ann Eliza Bleecker, Bathsheba Bowers, Esther Edwards Burr, Jane Colden, Hannah Mather Crocker, Elizabeth Drinker, Hannah Duston, Sarah Pierpont Edwards, Jenny Fenno, Hannah Webster Foster, Winifred Marshall Gales, Grace Growden Galloway, Sarah Prince Gill, Anne MacVicar Grant, Sarah Ewing Hall, Elizabeth Hanson, Anne Hart, Elizabeth Hart, Jane Fenn Hoskens, Anne Hulton, Sophia Hume, Susan Mansfield Huntington, Susanna Johnson, Mary Kinnan, Sarah Kemble Knight, Anne Home Livingston, Deborah Norris Logan, Martha Daniell Logan, Margaret Morris, Judith Sargent Murray, Sarah Osborn, Eliza Lucas Pinckney, Martha Laurens Ramsay, Martha Meredith Read, Maria van Cortlandt van Rensselaer, Mary Rowlandson, Susanna Rowson, Rebecca Rush, Leonora Sansay, Elizabeth Ann Seton, Eunice Smith, Sarah Pogson Smith, Tabitha Gilman Tenney, Caroline Matilda Warren Thayer, Mary Palmer Tyler, Sukey Vickery, Mercy Otis Warren, Helena Wells, Eliza Yonge Wilkinson, Anna Green Winslow, Margaret Tyndal Winthrop, Sarah Wister, Sally Sayward Barrell Keating Wood.
- O'Toole, Tina, ed. Dictionary of Munster Women Writers 1800–2000. Cork University Press, 2005.
- Partow, Elaine T. The Female Dramatist: Profiles of Women Playwrights from the Middle Ages to Contemporary Times. New York: Facts on File, 1998.
- Pollack, Sandra, et al., eds. Contemporary Lesbian Writers of the United States: a bio-bibliographical critical sourcebook. Greenwood Press, 1993.
  - entries on 100 'authors who, at some point during the 1970–1992 period, had written as self-identified lesbians': Donna Allegra, Paula Gunn Allen, Dorothy Allison, Gloria E. Anzaldúa, Nuala Archer, June Arnold, Judith Barrington, Terry Baum, Robin Becker, Becky Birtha, Julie Blackwomon, Alice Bloch, Sdiane Adams Bogus, Sandy Boucher, Blanche McCrary Boyd, Maureen Brady, Beth Brant, Olga Broumas, Rita Mae Brown, Patrick Califia, Jane Chambers, Chrystos, Cheryl Clarke, Jan Clausen, Michelle Cliff, Clare Coss, Martha Courtot, Doris Davenport, Nancy Dean, Jacqueline de Angelis, (Mary) Terri De la Peña, Alexis DeVeaux, Rachel Guido DeVries, Sarah Anne Dreher, Elana Dykewomon, Katherine V. Forrest, Suzanne Gardinier, Sally Miller Gearhart, Jewelle Gomez, Melinda Goodman, Janice Gould, Camarin Grae, Judy Grahn, Susan Griffin, Rosa (Cuthbert) Guy, Marilyn Hacker, Eloise Klein Healy, Terri L. Jewell, Melanie Kaye/Kantrowitz, Willyce Kim, Irena Klepfisz, Lola Lai Jong, Jacqueline Lapidus, Joan Larkin, Andrea Freud Loewenstein, Audre Lorde, Lee Lynch, Paula Martinac, Vicki P. McConnell, Judith McDaniel, Isabel Miller, Kate Millett, Valerie Miner, Honor Moore, Cherríe Moraga, Robin Morgan, Eileen Myles, Joan Nestle, Lesléa Newman, Elisabeth Nonas, Karen Lee Osborne, Pat Parker, Minnie Bruce Pratt, Margaret Randall, Adrienne Rich, Ruthann Robson, Aleida Rodriguez, Mariana Romo-Carmona, Muriel Rukeyser, Jane Rule, Kate Rushin, Joanna Russ, Barbara Ruth, Canyon Sam, Sapphire, May Sarton, Sarah Schulman, Patricia Roth Schwartz, Sandra Scoppettone, Susan Sherman, Sheila Ortiz Taylor, Nancy Toder, Kitty Tsui, Luz Maria Umpierre-Herrera, Chea Villanueva, Jess Wells, Barbara Wilson, Mary Wings, Terry Wolverton, Jacqueline Woodson
- Richardson, Sarah, et al., eds. Writing on the Line: 20th century working-class women writers: an annotated list. Working Press, 1996.
- Sage, Lorna, ed. The Cambridge Guide to Women's Writing in English. Cambridge University Press, 1999. ISBN 0-521-49525-3
- Schlueter, Paul, and June Schlueter, eds. An Encyclopedia of British Women Writers. Revised and expanded edition. Rutgers University Press, 1998. (Internet Archive)
  - approx. 600 biographical-critical entries, arranged alphabetically by name: 'In part, the project was a recovery effort, validating the work of a large cast of women writers, many of whom wrote anonymously or under male pseudonyms or who, in their time, were for the most part, neglected.'
- Shapiro, Ann R., ed. Jewish American Women Writers: a bio-bibliographical and critical sourcebook. Greenwood Press, 1994.
- Shattock, Joanne, ed. The Oxford Guide to British Women Writers. Oxford University Press, 1993.
- Shelton, Pamela L., ed. Contemporary women poets. St. James Press, 1998. ISBN 978-1-55862-356-9
  - 250 entries, each including a biography, listing of works, personal statement by the poet, and a critical essay.
- Showalter, Elaine, et al., eds. Modern American Women Writers. Maxwell Macmillan International, 1991.
  - entries on: Maya Angelou, Elizabeth Bishop, Louise Bogan, Gwendolyn Brooks, Willa Cather, Kate Chopin, Emily Dickinson, Joan Didion, H.D., Jessie Fauset, Mary E. Wilkins Freeman, Charlotte Perkins Gilman, Ellen Glasgow, Susan Glaspell, Elizabeth Hardwick, Frances Ellen Watkins Harper, Lillian Hellman, Zora Neale Hurston, Sarah Orne Jewett, Maxine Hong Kingston, Amy Lowell, Mary McCarthy, Carson McCullers, Edna St. Vincent Millay, Marianne Moore, Toni Morrison, Anaïs Nin, Joyce Carol Oates, Flannery O'Connor, Grace Paley, Dorothy Parker, Sylvia Plath, Katherine Anne Porter, Adrienne Rich, Anne Sexton, Susan Sontag, Gertrude Stein, Anne Tyler, Alice Walker, Eudora Welty, Edith Wharton.
- Smith, Jessie Carney, ed. Notable Black American Women. 1991.
- Thesing, William B., ed. Victorian Women Poets. Gale Group, 1999.
- Thesing, William B., ed. Late Nineteenth- and Early Twentieth-century British Women Poets. Gale Group, 2001.
- Todd, Janet, ed. British Women Writers: a critical reference guide. London: Routledge, 1989.
- Todd, Janet, ed. A Dictionary of British and American women writers, 1660–1800. Rowman & Allanheld, 1985. (Internet Archive)
  - 450 entries, 68 of which are American
- Weekes, Ann Owens. Unveiling Treasures: the Attic guide to the published works of Irish women literary writer: drama, fiction, poetry
- Wilson, Katherina M., et al. An Encyclopedia of Continental Women Writers. Garland Reference Library of the Humanities. Vol. v. 698. New York: Garland Publishing, 1991.
- Wilson, Katharina M., et al. Women Writers of Great Britain and Europe: an encyclopedia. Garland Publishing, 1997.
  - Reprints, with photos, selections from An Encyclopedia of Continental Women Writers (above)

== See also ==
- List of female rhetoricians
- Women's writing (literary category)
