= Daughters of Light =

1999 book by Rebecca Larson

Daughters of Light: Quaker Women Preaching and Prophesying in the Colonies and Abroad, 1700-1775
- Author: Rebecca Larson
- Publication date: 1999
- ISBN: 0-679-43762-2

Daughters of Light: Quaker Women Preaching and Prophesying in the Colonies and Abroad, 1700-1775 is a book by Rebecca Larson, published in 1999. It provides specific studies of 18th century women ministers, evidencing the progressive nature of Quaker views on women.

== Author ==
Rebecca Larson was born in 1959. She has a BA at the University of California, Santa Barbara and a Ph.D. at Harvard University. At the time of publication, she lived in Santa Barbara

== Content ==
In addition to the text, the book contains an appendix giving individual descriptions of the transatlantic Ministers, of about 10-15 lines on each person:

- Alice (Burton) Alderson (1678-1766):
- Elizabeth (Sampson) (?) (Sullivan) Ashbridge (1713-1755):
- Sarah (Payton) (Clarke) Baker (1669-1714):
- Mary (Hogsflesh) Bannister (fl.. 1703)
- Barbara Bevan (1682-1705)
- Jane (Boid) (Atkinson) Biles (d. 1709)
- Esther (Palmer) Champion (1678-1714)
- Esther (Peacock) Clare (ca. 1675-1742)
- Comfort (Stanyan) (Hoag) CoIIins (1711-1816)
- Hannah (Dent) Cooper (d. 1754)
- Margaret Copeland (1684-1759)
- Jane (Rowlandson) Crosfield (1712-1784
- Phebe (Willets) (Mott) Dodge (1699-1782)
- Mary (?) Ellerton (d. 1736)
- Margaret Ellis (d. 1765 in old age)
- Alice (Featherstone) Hall (1708-1762)
- Eliphal (Smith) (Perry) Harper (d. 1747):
- Hannah (Featherstone) Harris (1708-1786)
- Rebecca (Owen) (Minshall) Harvey (b. 1687-fl. 1751)
- Jane (Fenn) Hoskins (1694-1764):
- Sophia (Wigington) Hume (1702-1774)
- Mary (Goodwin) James (d. ca. 1776)
- Elizabeth (?) Kay (d. 1713)
- Mary (Ransome) Kirby (1709-1779)
- Mary (Payne) Leaver (1720-1789)
- Margaret (Thomas) Lewis (1712-1789)
- Susanna (Hudson) (Hatton) Lightfoot (1720-1781)
- Ann (Herbert) Moore (1710-1783)
- Elizabeth (Roberts) Morgan (1688-1777)
- Elizabeth (Hudson) Morris (1722-1783)
- Sarah Morris (1703-1775)
- Susanna (Heath) Morris (1682-1755)
- Mary (Peisley) Neale (1717-1757)
- Esther (Palmer) Champion (1678-1714)
- Esther (Peacock) Clare (ca. 1675-1742)
- Comfort (Stanyan) (Hoag) Collins (1711-1816)
- Sarah (Clements) Owen (fl. 1703)
- Ann (Chapman) Parsons (1676-1732)
- Mary (Morgan) Pennell (1678-1764)
- Catharine (Payton) Phillips (1726-1794)
- Elizabeth (Beck) Rawlinson (1670-1750)
- Ann (Lewis) (Williams) (Bennett) Roberts (1678-1750)
- Mary (Wheeler) Rogers (d. 1699)
- Elizabeth (Levis) Shipley (1690-1777)
- Ann (Waln) (Dillworth) Sibthorp (1654-1710)
- Elizabeth Smith (1724-1772)
- Margaret (Paine) Stones (d. 1740)
- Rebecca (England) Turner (d. 1721)
- Mary (Hayes) (Lewis) Waln (d. 1753)
- Mary (Pace) Waring (1712-1776)
- Abigail (Craven) (Boles) Watson (1684-1752)
- Elizabeth Webb (1663-1727)
- Elizabeth (Duckworth) Whartnaby (d. 1734)
- Esther (Canby) (Stapler) White (1700-1777)
- Elizabeth (Scot) Wilkinson (1712-1771)
- Rachel (Wilson) Wilson (1720-1775)
- Sarah (Goodwin) Worrell (d. 1775)

== Reviews ==
- The Pennsylvania Magazine of History and Biography, Vol. 124, No. 3,(July, 2000), pp. 437-439: Review by Jean R Soderlund (Subscription access)
- William & Mary Quarterly Vol. 59 No. 2 (April 2001)-taster of first 3 paragraphs - subscription needed for whole article)
- Collection of short reviews of this book in DC Public Library online
