= Cogenhoe =

Village in Northamptonshire, England

Coordinates: 52.237°N 0.793°W

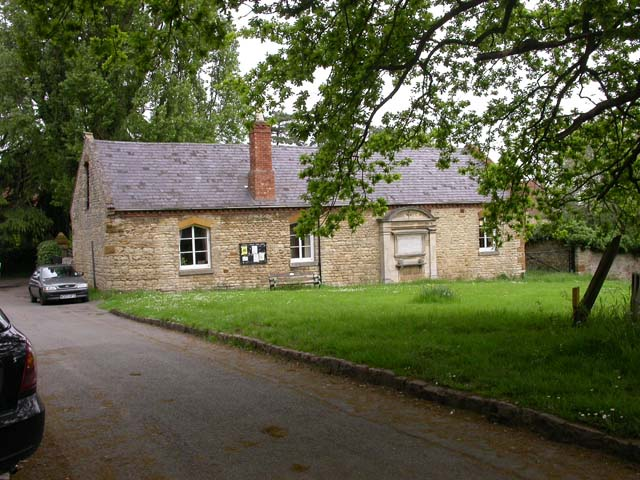
- St Peters Church Hall

- Location within Northamptonshire
- Population: 1,436 (2011)
- OS grid reference: SP8260
  - London: 71 miles (114 km)
- Civil parish: Cogenhoe and Whiston
- Unitary authority: West Northamptonshire
- Ceremonial county: Northamptonshire
- Region: East Midlands
- Country: England
- Sovereign state: United Kingdom
- Post town: Northampton
- Postcode district: NN7
- Dialling code: 01604
- Police: Northamptonshire
- Fire: Northamptonshire
- Ambulance: East Midlands
- UK Parliament: South Northamptonshire
- Website: Cogenhoe and Whiston Parish Council

Cogenhoe (locally /ˈkʊknoʊ/ KUUK-noh, /-nə/) is a village and former civil parish, now in the parish of Cogenhoe and Whiston, in the West Northamptonshire district, in the ceremonial county of Northamptonshire, England. The civil parish of Cogenhoe and Whiston had a population at the 2011 census of 1,436.

The village of Cogenhoe is some five miles (8 km) east of the county town, Northampton. Cogenhoe is situated on high ground overlooking the Nene Valley. It has grown into a large village with varied amenities including football, cricket and bowls clubs.

The village has a number of facilities including the sports clubs listed below. Other facilities include a village pub (the Royal Oak), a village shop (Londis), Cogenhoe and Whiston Village Hall and Playing Fields, the Church Rooms, the Cogenhoe Sports and Social Club and a primary school (Cogenhoe Primary School).

== Civil parish ==
On 1 April 1935, the parish of Whiston was merged with Cogenhoe. On 21 January 1980, the new parish was renamed to "Cogenhoe & Whiston". In 1931 the parish of Cogenhoe (prior to the merge) had a population of 461.

== History ==
In prehistory, the Nene valley was a system of braided channels with Neolithic and later, Bronze Age humans living in and around the area. The main evidence from these periods is the many flint tools which have been found including arrow heads, scrapers, boring tools and an axe-head. On top of the hill towards Cogenhoe Firs, and almost halfway between Cogenhoe and Whiston (the nearest hamlet), one group of people were actively engaged in making these tools and possibly trading them.

Their little settlement looked north and down into the river valley where, over many years, they constructed a barrow cemetery of at least six large mounds, each presumably containing at least one grave of an important member of the community. Only one of these mounds has survived the plough and is now a Scheduled Ancient Monument and can be seen from the footpath to Earls Barton.

There were a number of Iron Age settlements in the Parish including one in Short Lane. A later settlement took root on the south side of Cogenhoe Firs and developed into an important Romano-British settlement which lasted for several hundred years. Apart from a villa with mosaic floors, there were many other buildings with a variety of uses. Iron slag suggests that they had learned to use the local ores for smelting and other materials included copper alloy and glass were also used. A large number of bronze coins were found over the years and a grave with a small child was discovered in 1959. The body had been buried with two small pewter dishes beside it.

Another Romano-British villa was built on the southern rim of the valley and east of Whiston. Still to be excavated, this villa had glass windows and other high status building materials. In Cogenhoe village, north of Station Road, a number of skeletons from the Romano-British period have been found. One group of three included two children and an adult with a snake's head bracelet on their wrist. Another, decapitated skeleton was found with its head lying between its legs. Yet another skeleton, also decapitated was left to lie in peace in one of the gardens off Station Road and is still there to this day. One of the front gardens in Corn Kiln Close is home to the Roman corn drying kiln that lies preserved there and which gives the Close its name. When the E-shaped kiln was excavated in the early 1960s, a variety of finds included animal bones, antlers, quern stones (for grinding corn), a bronze brooch, a buckle and numerous coins were found. There were even carbonised grains of corn left by the Roman farmer.

Later pottery from the Dark Ages has been found west of Cogenhoe Church (St Peters). This may have belonged to the first Christians to worship there. Later Saxon pottery was also found further to the west and it was probably these people who gave Cogenhoe its name. The name, Cogenhoe, has two elements to it. The second, ...hoe, is easy to interpret – having a topographical origin. A hoe was a spur of land, usually overlooking a valley. Other Northamptonshire examples include Farthinghoe and Wadenhoe. The first part of the name is problematic. It could refer to a personal name – Cucga's Hoe. A 19th century cleric believed that it was a corruption of the Latin word, gucken; if so it became Gucken Hoe or Spy Hill. Latin place names though are rare and it is more likely that it is a corruption of a Germanic word which may have the same or similar meaning – a lookout place (modern German gucken means "to watch").

At Cogenhoe, a medieval settlement north of the church which included narrow closes and a fishpond also became empty – probably by the early modern period. At Domesday, there was a third settlement or manor that was centred on the present Cotton Farm where a number of houses were shown on the later Cogenhoe map of 1630. These were in the field to the south of Cotton Farm but then seem to have disappeared soon after – possibly by fire. A large quantity of pottery and other finds have been discovered on this site, and a crudely made stone cross base was found in a wall on Cotton Hill in the 1960s.

Apart from agriculture the village has, over time, supported other industries. Until the 19th century, this was a woollen and textiles area, but from the mid 19th century until shortly after the Second World War, Cogenhoe became a boot and shoe village, with the Mann family first working from a converted cottage in Church Street, then to a purpose-built factory in Whiston Road. When that burnt down in 1909, a replacement factory was built in Short Lane which was used until the late 1940s, when production ceased and it became a bus garage. That too was destroyed by fire in the early 1970s.

Alongside the boot and shoe industry was the remains of the hand lace trade. It was a cottage-based industry with a lace school in Church Street where children might have been taught the basic 3Rs and the Catechism but also and more importantly, how to make bone lace. By the late 19th century, this ancient craft was gradually being driven into decline by the Nottinghamshire machine lace industry, but it still exists today as a hobby or past-time practised by very skilled craftspeople.

One of the most important factors in encouraging industrial growth in the area was the opening of the Blisworth to Peterborough Railway (the Northampton and Peterborough Railway) in 1845. Operated by the London and North Western Railway Company (LNWR), it became a very busy line with stations at Billing Road, west of Cogenhoe, and Castle Ashby (Castle Ashby & Earls Barton railway station), east of Whiston. Many local men worked on the line as plate-layers, signalmen and porters, and the busy goods yard at Billing dispatched agricultural produce and boots and shoes out to the larger centres and accepted coal, fertiliser and many other goods for local customers.

Cogenhoe was involved in the extractive industries. Digging for iron ore began at Cogenhoe in the late 1850s with opencast quarrying and mines – the latter of which, according to local lore, collapsed one lunchtime while the men were away having their midday meals. The mines were for whatever reason opened out in about 1868. The quarries continued up the hill towards the Firs. These quarries were connected to the main London and North Western Railway in the valley by way of narrow gauge and standard gauge private branch-lines. The narrow gauge line was cable worked taking the ore down to a tipping dock on the standard gauge branch. In about 1870, the operation moved west with a standard gauge line running through what is now the Pocket Park to the Ironstone field south of the Playing Fields. A short narrow gauge branch always worked by hand or horses connected that quarry to the standard gauge branch. The standard gauge line was originally operated by gravity and horses, the loaded wagons coasting down the gradient from the western end of the line to just south of the road near Roe Farm. However steam locomotives were introduced in 1880 or shortly afterwards.

As well as quarrying for limestone and operating lime kilns on the south side of Whiston Road, the iron ore industry at Cogenhoe was also associated with a brickworks west of Roe Farm. There, 'commons' and 'facings' were made from local clay – the latter bearing the legend, 'COGENHOE' in the frog. However, the economic depression of the late 1880s saw the end of both iron ore extraction and brick-making at Cogenhoe. The pond to the west of Roe Farm is the remains of a brick pit.

After a lull of some 25 years, iron ore extraction started again, but this time on the Whiston side of the Firs. Stimulated by the need for iron and steel for war materials, the Whiston Pits were opened by J.W. Pain in 1914. As well as iron ore, the overlying limestone was removed and also ganister, a mineral used to line furnaces with.

Using more modern, steam-operated machinery, the quarrying eventually burst through into the old Cogenhoe workings. Brand new equipment was used, including a standard gauge steam locomotive made by Andrew Barclay Sons & Co. which was kept in a brick engine shed on the side of the Hill, just west of Whiston village. In 1917, the works were leased out, and they then changed hands several times before closing in about 1922. The engine was transferred to the Hunsbury Hill Furnaces who bought out the company. The little engine shed has long since gone, but the old workings and railway tracks can still be picked out in the landscape.

At Cogenhoe, the pre-war coach firm of York Brothers (George and Fred York) continued to flourish in the 1950s. They operated a stage carriage route between Wollaston and Northampton, via many of the local villages, but, also ran a travel company with coach excursions to all parts of the country. As their bus fleet grew, they swallowed up several of the smaller concerns and became not just an important local employer but also developed a national reputation for quality. Yorks, as part of a bigger concern, finally closed for business in 2012.

In the 1960s, Midland Capacitors established themselves in Church Street, making components for black and white televisions. For some time, every television in the country had parts made at Cogenhoe. The company lasted for some years and, like the boot and shoe factories before it, also provided a lot of out-work for local people.

Cogenhoe has undergone a major explosion of growth since the 1960s. Formerly a market gardening village, one by one the allotments and orchards have given way to new housing estates as the village has gradually transformed into a commuter settlement.

Cogenhoe is now largely a commuter village, with most people working in Northampton or further afield due to its road links with the A45 and M1 motorway.

== St Peter's Church ==
From at least the reign of Henry II when William de Cogenhoe erected a small church, and probably much earlier, a place of worship has stood on this spot in Church Street in the old part of the village.

Between 1225 and 1280 Nicholas de Cogenhoe, believed to be a Crusader, built a new church, and his effigy rests today in the South aisle of St. Peter's. The son of Nicholas, William de Cogenhoe, opened up an arch on the north side of the chancel in AD 1320 and built a Chantry Chapel to Our Lady. About 20 years later William's son, Giles de Cogenhoe, widened the nave and added the north and south aisles and a Founders' Chapel in the south aisle.

The grandson of Giles was another William de Cogenhoe, who began building the clerestory about 1360. The south porch was added in 1380, and about this time William's daughter, Agnes, built the tower as a memorial to her father. The registers of St. Peter's dated from 1568 and include a census of the village taken in 1624. By the north door is a Blackletter King James Bible dated 1617.

Within the belfry hang six bells ranging from 3 cwts 3 qtrs to 8 cwts 3 qtrs (187 kg to 437 kg). Two were originally cast in 1678, while another was of unknown 14th-century origin. These three were recast and rehung with the additions in 1909. The bells were further turned and re-hung in 2003 by John Taylor & Co of Loughborough, who operate the largest bell foundry in the world.

Architectural features of special interest include ten shields and nine heads on pillars and corbels. The church is grade II* listed.

The church is part of the United Benefice of Cogenhoe and Great Houghton and Little Houghton with Brafield on the Green, in the Peterborough Diocese.

== Pocket Park ==
In 1984 Cogenhoe was one of the first Pocket Parks to be set up under Northamptonshire County Council's scheme and indeed one of the first in the country. The land is on the Compton Estate which adjoins Castle Ashby House in an area which could not be used for agriculture. The park is leased to the Cogenhoe and Whiston Parish Council and managed by the Cogenhoe Pocket Park Management Group.

Access to the park is via Short Lane off Station Road near the Royal Oak Pub. Previously the site was used for ironstone extraction for buildings in the village. The park contains a ford and the remains of the old ironstone railway.

Cogenhoe or Short Lane Pocket Park is a beautiful woodland with a stream and pond and is managed for the enjoyment of the public and the protection of wildlife.

The park is divided into two areas: A byway leading to farm buildings and fields, this passes through the ford and the banks are sometimes grazed by cows and a broad gully dominated by ash trees and to the southern end aspen and poplars.

In general the spinney has been left to its own devices, but maintained in such a way to allow safe access. A quarter of the spinney has been coppiced to allow for natural regeneration and replanted with trees typical of this part of Northamptonshire. The pond, which is popular with breeding amphibians is kept as natural as possible.

Butterflies including Speckled Wood, Fungi including Jew's ear, Stag's horn and Shaggy Parasol and two nationally rare beetles: Magdalis barbicornis and Kissophagus hederae have been identified in the park.

== Sport ==
Despite Cogenhoe's size it manages to support a number of successful sporting ventures, attracting players and members from across Northamptonshire.

=== Cogenhoe United Football Club ===
Their early days were not documented and are now obscure. Inter-village friendlies gradually led to membership of the now extinct Central Village League. A variety of pitches were used until in 1950 the first game, against Northampton Yeomanry, was played on the then new playing field. United ceased to exist after 1958, and re-formed for the 1967-8 season, competing in the Central Northants Football Combination. By 1978 the club had progressed from the Second Division into the Premier Division. In a six-year period thirteen winners' and six runners-up trophies were won. Development of facilities became paramount for promotion into the United Counties Football League. A lease on 3.6 acres (15,000 m^{2}) of agricultural land was obtained from the Marquis of Northampton. Compton Park was now on the map and purpose-built facilities were developed with a spectator stand and the team gained promotion into the UCFL for the season 1985-86.

=== Cogenhoe Cricket Club ===
The club currently (2018) play at Cogenhoe Playing Fields in Division 5 (1st XI) and Division 10 (2nd XI) of the Northamptonshire Cricket League.

=== Cogenhoe Bowls Club ===
The village also hosts a thriving mixed club, with approximately 70 members.

=== Community Life ===
- 1st Cogenhoe Sea Scout Group
- Cogenhoe and Whiston Heritage Society – study, record and stimulate interest in the history and heritage of the two villages
- Ladies Fellowship – Ladies group connected to St Peters Church
- Mature Movers – Gentle fitness classes aimed at improving overall fitness, flexibility, balance and coordination in the 50+ age group
- Walking for Health Group – relatively short fortnightly walks

== Notable residents ==
Former Blue Peter presenter Peter Purves lived for a number of years at the Old Rectory

The mystery writer Sheila Robinson, known for her work under the pseudonyms Sheila Radley and Hester Rowan, was from Cogenhoe.
