= Quaker views on women =

Aspect of Quakerism

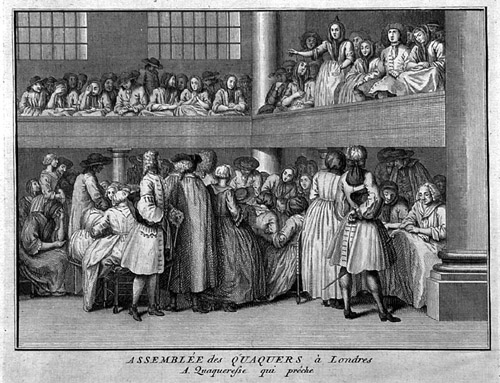
A female Quaker preaches at a meeting in London in the 18th century.

Quaker views on women have always been considered progressive in their own time (beginning in the 17th century), and in the late 19th century this tendency bore fruit in the prominence of Quaker women in the American women's rights movement.

The early history of attitudes towards gender in the Religious Society of Friends (i.e. Quakers) is particularly notable for providing for one of the largest and most equitable roles for women in the Christian tradition at the time, despite not endorsing universal equality until much later.

== History ==
For many outside observers during the first hundred years of Quakerism, the most surprising aspect of Quakerism was that "ministry" – the prerogative to speak during a Quaker meeting – was open to women from the very beginnings of the movement in the 1650s. One of the earliest to formulate direct biblical justification for this was Sarah Blackborow. Margaret Fell, one of the Valiant Sixty and referred to as the "Mother of Quakerism", argued in favor of women preachers in her work Womens Speaking Justified. Her work on the subject is considered to have been among the most comprehensive at the time. In James Boswell's Life of Johnson, Samuel Johnson's opinion of a female Quaker preacher was recorded thus: "Sir, a woman's preaching is like a dog walking on his hind legs. It is not done well; but you are surprised to find it done at all." Especially in the early years, a large number – even possibly the majority – of traveling Quaker preachers were women. Out of 141 traveling Quaker ministers from America to England between 1685 and 1835, 34% were women. While some radical Puritan sects allowed women to preach, the conception of gender equality in Quakerism was unparalleled by other groups at the time. Aside from ministry, Quaker women traveled alone and published their writing, which was also unusual for the time. Several of the Valiant Sixty were women.

For many Quakers, both historical and contemporary, the inclusion of women is part of what is now called the "Testimony of Equality". However, despite that testimony, women's roles were not completely equal for many years. In the beginning, meetings for worship for business were dominated by male Friends, but within twenty-five years, George Fox ordered establishment of separate women's meetings when he faced challenges to his leadership. Particularly controversial was his decision that women's meetings for discipline should be the first to pass on a couple's intention to be married. Separate meetings declined by the 19th century and were eliminated later. Having authority over any business at all – let alone authority over men (in the form of approving or denying marriages) – was a radical move in the 17th century, and gave women then-rare experience in running organizations. Concerning the introduction and much later dissolution of separate meetings, one historian writes,

"On balance, and in the long run, I believe that the separate women's meeting was good for women; indeed, it may be said to have been a cradle not only of modern feminism but of the movements of abolitionism, women's suffrage, and peace activism, all of which were, and are, enlivened by the presence (even predominance) of Quaker female leaders."

== In the United States ==
Quakers were heavily involved in the 19th-century movement for women's rights in the United States. Susan B. Anthony, who was born into a Quaker family, is a prominent example. She founded the American Equal Rights Association. The Progressive Friends, a radical Quaker group which supported women's empowerment, were formed shortly before the Seneca Falls Convention. The landmark 1848 Seneca Falls Declaration was in large part the work of Quaker women, and has numerous Quaker signatories, well out of proportion to the number of Quakers in American society at large. Lucretia Mott, who co-wrote the Declaration of Sentiments, was one such individual. Their influence was felt at the Rochester Women's Rights Convention of 1848 not long after the Seneca Falls Convention.

Radical abolitionist Quakers, including those who were conductors on the Underground Railroad, exhibited principles of gender equality through their aggressive recruiting of both men and women.

The tradition of Quaker involvement in women's rights continued into the 20th and 21st centuries, with Quakers playing large roles in organizations continuing to work on women's rights. For example, Alice Paul was a Quaker woman who was a prominent leader in the National Woman's Party, which advocated for the Equal Rights Amendment.

== See also ==
- Daughters of Light
- Ordination of women
