= Susanna Anthony =

American diarist (1726–1791)

- Born: October 25, 1726; Newport, Rhode Island
- Died: June 23, 1791 (aged 64)
- Known for: diarist

Susanna Anthony (October 25, 1726 – June 23, 1791) was an American diarist.

== Biography ==
Born in Newport, Rhode Island as the youngest daughter of a goldsmith, she was raised as a Quaker but converted to a Congregationalist in the midst of the First Great Awakening in 1741. Anthony never married and lived an uneventful life but her diary chronicles a complicated spiritual existence.

=== Career ===
She penned more than a thousand pages of diary entries that were excerpted by pastor Samuel Hopkins for his 1796 book The Life and Character of Miss Susanna Anthony. She kept a daily account of her life until 1769 (or none following that date were preserved by the time of Hopkins' book) but of those only a single volume (covering November 1, 1748, to May 5, 1751) currently survives, owned by the Connecticut Museum of Culture and History. The most notable highlight excerpted by Hopkins was the account of her 1741 conversion written years later at the age of 28. Some of her many letters to Hopkins and others, most frequently her friend Sarah Osborn, were collected as Familiar Letters in 1807.
