= Whiston, Northamptonshire =

Village in Northamptonshire, England

Coordinates: 52.2375°N 0.7585°W

Whiston
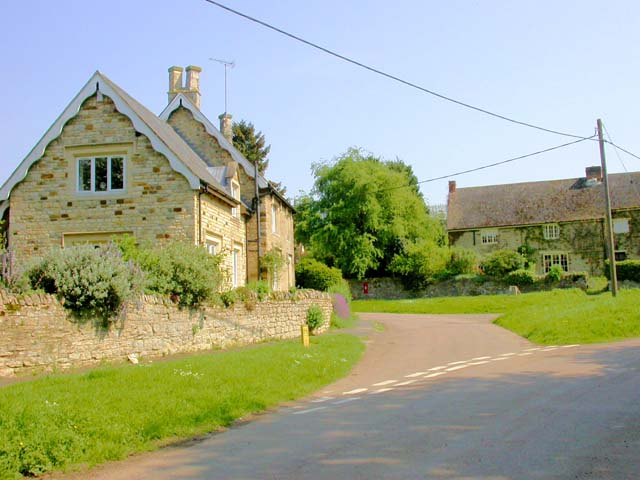

- Location within Northamptonshire
- Population: 51 (2001)
- OS grid reference: SP848606
  - London: 72 miles (116 km)
- Civil parish: Cogenhoe and Whiston
- Unitary authority: West Northamptonshire
- Ceremonial county: Northamptonshire
- Region: East Midlands
- Country: England
- Sovereign state: United Kingdom
- Post town: Northampton
- Postcode district: NN7
- Dialling code: 01604
- Police: Northamptonshire
- Fire: Northamptonshire
- Ambulance: East Midlands
- UK Parliament: South Northamptonshire

Whiston is a village and former civil parish, now in the parish of Cogenhoe and Whiston, in West Northamptonshire, England. It is 4 miles (6.4 km) due east of Northampton. In 1931 the parish had a population of 49.

== History ==
The name of the village derives from Old English and was first recorded as Hwiccingtune in 974. It means "the farmstead of the Hwicce tribe." On 1 April 1935 the parish was abolished and merged with Cogenhoe.

== The Church ==
Whiston Church is dedicated to St Mary the Virgin. The present building was built for Anthony Catesby in the early 16th century. It is on the hill, separated from the rest of the village, from where it is reached by a footpath. The tower was built first and the church was probably complete by 1534.

== Quarrying ==
Quarrying for iron ore and limestone was carried out at Whiston between 1914 and about 1922. The quarry was to the south west of the village adjoining an earlier quarry at Cogenhoe. The quarrying must at first have been done by hand with the aid of explosives but a steam navvy and a transporter machine was brought in in 1915. The ore was taken away by a steeply graded standard gauge railway leading to sidings at the London & North Western Railway's Northampton to Peterborough line. This was operated by a steam locomotive (a saddle tank engine built by Andrew Barclay Sons & Co Ltd.) The gradient was in favour of the loaded trains.
