= The Cambridge Guide to Women's Writing in English =

1999 book

The Cambridge Guide to Women's Writing in English is a biographical dictionary of women writers and women's writing in English published by Cambridge University Press in 1999 (ISBN 0-521-49525-3). It was edited by Lorna Sage, with Germaine Greer and Elaine Showalter as advisory editors, and contains more than 2,500 entries written by over 300 contributors.
