= Olivia Knight =

Irish poet

- Born: 29 September 1828; Rathbawn, Castlebar, County Mayo, Ireland
- Died: 2 June 1908 (aged 79); Bundaberg, Queensland, Australia
- Occupations: teacher, writer, poet, translator
- Writing career
- Language: French, English

Olivia Knight (29 September 1828? – 2 June 1908) also known as Mrs Hope Connolly was an Irish-Australian poet, essayist, translator and teacher. She also published under the names "Thomasine" and "Celtica".

== Early life ==
Olivia Mary Knight was born probably on 29 September 1828 in Rathbawn, Castlebar, County Mayo, Ireland. Her parents were Simon, a civil engineer, and his wife, Sarah (possibly née D'Alton). Knight had one brother, Arthur E. Patrick Knight. Her paternal uncle, Patrick Knight was also an engineer. Knight attended school locally, and later claimed to have developed her "thirst of information and reading" from her mother. Her father died when Knight was young, and the family moved to Tucker Street, Castlebar.

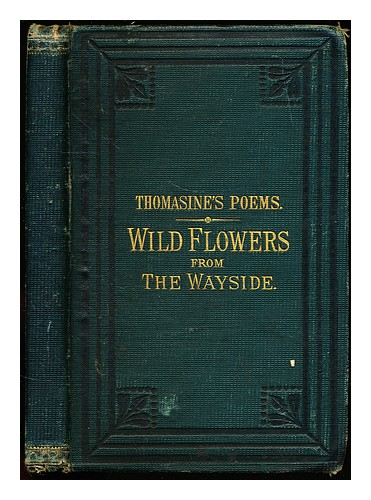
Thomasine's Poems Wildflowers from the Wayside by Olivia Knight

Knight took up employment as a national school teacher to help support her brother and mother. She was a teacher in Ireland for 14 years, teaching in a private school in Castlebar for six years, spending four years as a governess, and another four years at Gainstown national school, near Mullingar. She was trained at the Dublin Training Establishment, receiving her teacher's classification certificate in 1860. She also studied music and drawing, playing both the harmonium and piano. She studied music under John William Glover. Knight's brother, Arthur was also a musician and composer who taught music privately in Castlebar. He composed an air for Knight's poem A Christmas carol.

== Career in Ireland ==
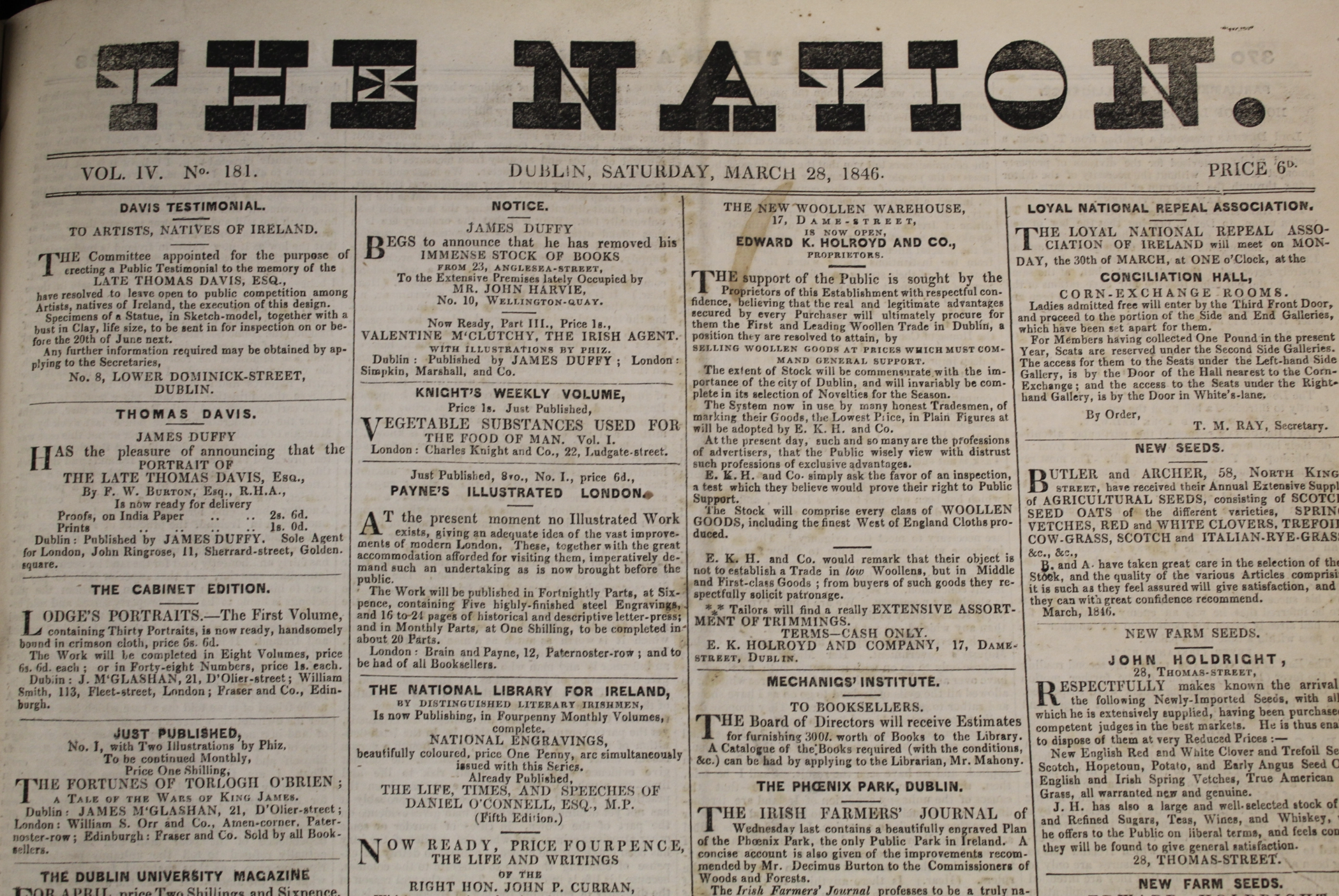
The Nation Irish newspaper front page Sat. March 28 1846

Knight began to correspond with editors of The Nation in 1844, using the nickname of "Thomasine". The name was likely in honour of Thomas Davis. Having corresponded with the Nation's editors for a number of years, she became a regular contributor in after the publication's revival in 1849. As "Thomasine of the Nation" she contributed prose, poems, and verse translations, in keeping with the Nation's nationalist tone. The themes of her poetry were emigration, separation, exile, alongside hope and religious faith. Knight's translations were primarily works of fiction, such as short stories in historical settings and contemporary fables on relevant topics including freedom of speech. These were mostly from French, and were published in the 1850s. Her translations were also published in James Duffy's magazines. During the period that Knight wrote for the Nation, she interacted with Mary Eva Kelly, who was known as "Eva of the Nation".

== Career in Australia ==
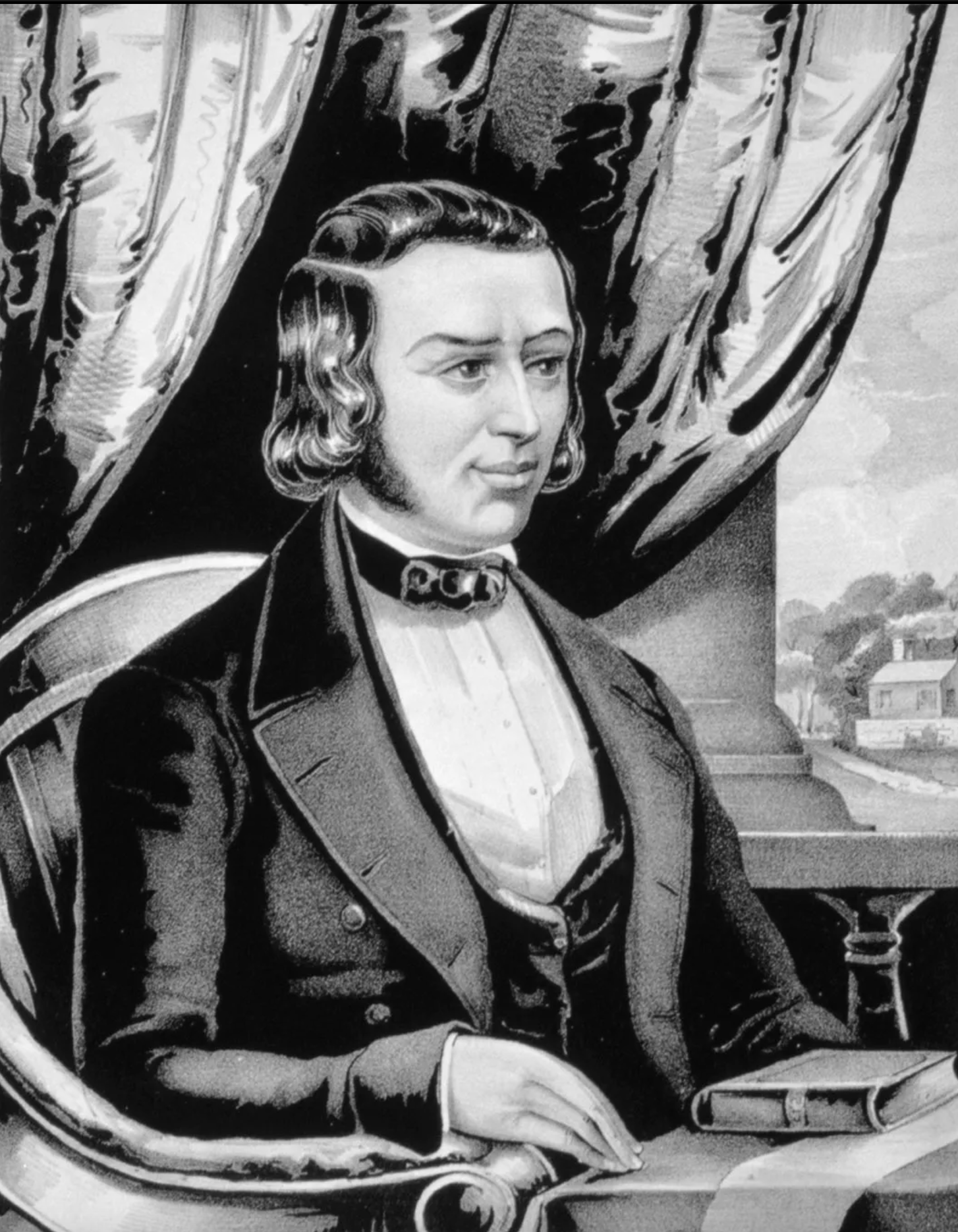
Sir Charles Gavan Duffy, young Irelander and Australian politician, who encouraged Olivia Knight in her writing

In 1859, Knight was offered a position in the proposed Catholic teacher training school in Brisbane, Australia by Bishop James Quinn. She travelled to Australia on the Erin-Go-Bragh, a ship charted by Quinn to bring Irish emigrants to Australia. She left Liverpool in January 1862 with her brother, with the six-month journey marred by 54 deaths from typhoid fever and scarlet fever out of the 431 immigrants aboard. Knight's mother had died around 1860, and she travelled as a "servant". The ship was quarantined at Moreton Bay, St Helena, docking in Brisbane on 2 August 1862. The journey was difficult for Arthur, and he died four years later in Ipswich, Queensland. Knight met Thomas Hope Connolly a journalist from Ballintogher, County Meath aboard the ship, and they married in 1869 at Rockhampton, Queensland. He died in 1872. Some accounts state she had an adopted daughter.

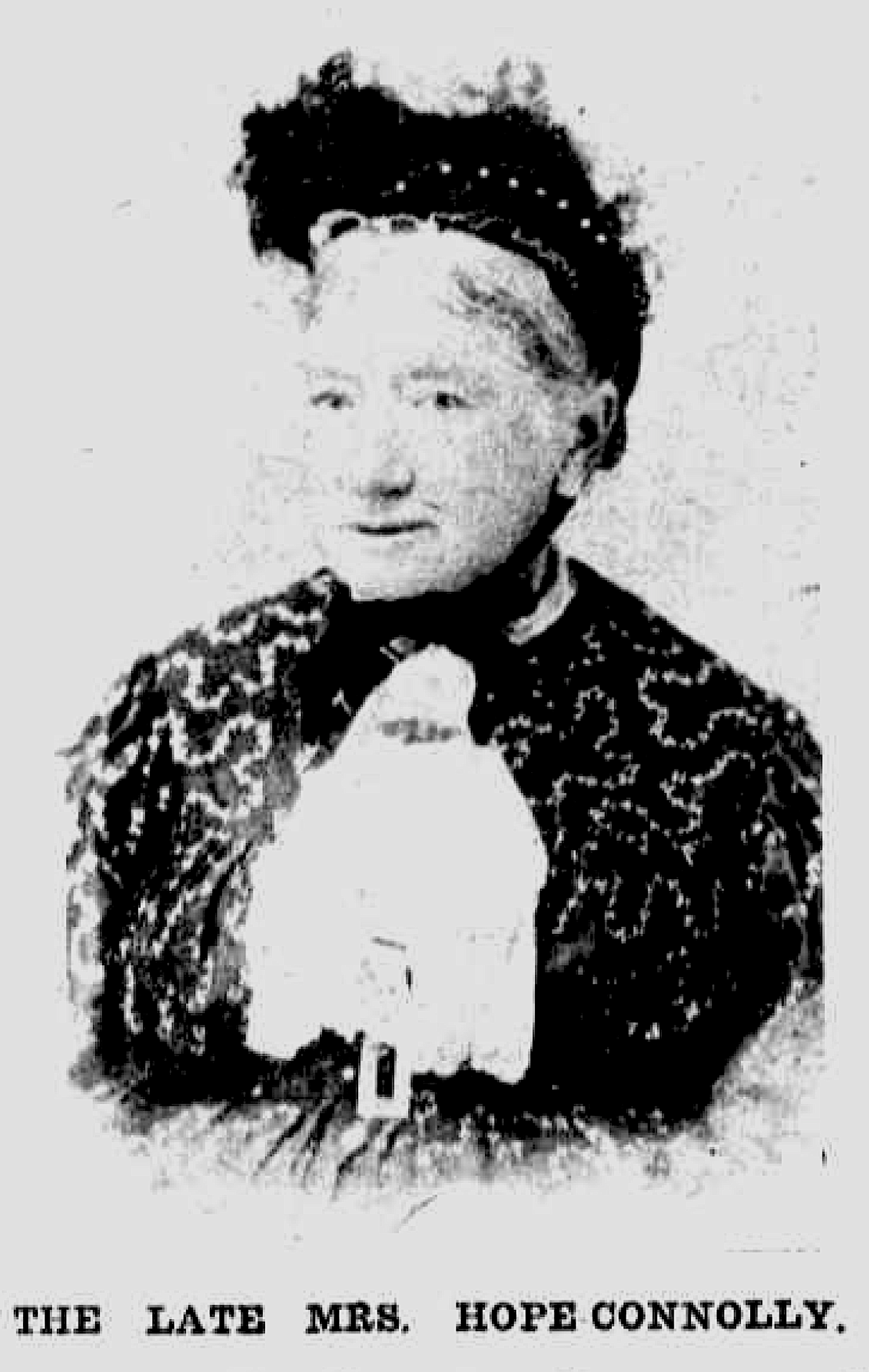
Olivia Knight Hope Connolly in later life.

The proposed training school failed, and Knight took up a position teaching in a Catholic school in Ipswich for eight months in 1863. In October 1863, she was employed at the Brisbane Normal School, and later taught at a number of other Queensland schools. She was appointed head teacher of Girls' National School of Rockhampton, transferring to Toolburra in June 1879. She remained in this post until she resigned on 31 December 1886. In 1888, she took up a post as librarian and secretary at the new Sandgate School of Arts, Brisbane. She was an active member of the Brisbane Literary Circle. It is thought she worked in a mall high-class school in Clermont during the 1890s while living and working as a governess in Barcaldine, Clermont, also running after school French classes.

Knight published less in Australia, but did contribute some poems and possibly a number of anonymous translations to Australian magazine and newspapers. She sometimes published under the name "Celtica". She was involved in the 1879 Thomas Moore centenary events held in Brisbane, reciting an ode she composed for the event. Encouraged by her life-long friend Charles Gavan Duffy, Knight published a volume of poetry entitled Wild flowers from the wayside (1883), which he edited and wrote an introduction for. "An unknown friend" appealed on her behalf in a newspaper in 1895, and when she was made aware of this she wrote to the paper to announce in the Sydney Freeman's Journal on 27 July 1895 that contrary to this friend's claims, her fire was not "quenched" and though "alone and poor" she was capable to caring for herself.

Knight died in Bundaberg, Queensland on 2 June 1908, and is buried at Bundaberg Catholic Cemetery. Obituaries to Knight were published in Ireland and Australia, one calling her a "patriot-poetess", and some of her poems were reprinted in a number of papers, including 'A prayer to St Patrick' and 'The green flag'.

A plaque was erected to Knight on her family home in Castlebar in 1943. The house was later demolished in 1986 controversially and a housing estate built on the site called Knight's Wood. There is a commemorative stone to Knight at the entrance to the estate.
