= Elizabeth Ashbridge =

18th-century Quaker minister and autobiographer

- Born: 1713
- Died: 1755 (aged 41–42)

Elizabeth Ashbridge (née Sampson; 1713 – May 16, 1755) was an 18th-century New England Quaker minister and autobiographer born in Cheshire, England. Her compelling autobiography, Some Account of the Fore Part of the Life of Elizabeth Ashbridge, provides a valuable firsthand account of her spiritual journey, her conversion to Quakerism, and the challenges she faced as a woman preacher in the 18th century. Ashbridge's writings offer insights into the social and religious landscape of colonial America, particularly the experiences of women and the development of Quaker communities. Her life story is characterized by her resilience in the face of adversity, her unwavering commitment to her faith, and her powerful voice as a religious leader.

== Biography ==
=== Early life ===

Elizabeth Sampson was born in 1713 to Thomas, a ship surgeon, and Mary Sampson of Middlewich in Cheshire, England. Mary Sampson was a devout member of the Church of England, and raised her daughter and Thomas' two children from a previous marriage in adherence to her faith. Few details are known about Elizabeth's family or her early life, however, her autobiography sheds light on some aspects of her life. In her autobiography, which details her life from the time she was first married until the death of her second husband, Ashbridge reveals that when she was 14 years old, in 1727, she eloped without parental consent, only to become a widow after five months of marriage.

Unwelcome at her parents' home, Ashbridge was sent to Dublin, Ireland; there, she resided first in Dublin with a relative of her mother and member of the Society of Friends, or Quakers. Upon finding life in accordance with his strict religious beliefs "gloomy", she moved to Ireland's west coast, where she stayed with Catholic relatives.

=== Voyage to British America and life in New England ===
In 1732 Ashbridge sailed to New York as an indentured servant, owned first by a woman in the slave trade and later by the ship's captain. After completing three of the four years of servitude required to pay her passage to the colonies, she bought her freedom with money she earned performing odd jobs and sewing. With her new-found freedom she considered a career on the stage, even going so far as to befriend members of local playhouses and study scripts in her spare time; instead, she married a school teacher surnamed Sullivan.

The nature of Sullivan's profession led the couple to travel widely throughout New England in search of schools in need of a schoolmaster. They settled briefly in Westerly, Rhode Island, where Ashbridge half-heartedly joined the Baptist church. After a failed attempt to travel to England, they moved to Boston in 1735, then back to Rhode Island later that year, where Ashbridge once again joined the Church of England. While visiting relatives in Pennsylvania, Ashbridge was taken with the Quaker faith, and became convinced, much to the disapproval of her husband. The couple stayed some time in Delaware, then moved on to Mount Holly, New Jersey, home of the influential Quaker John Woolman. Both Ashbridge and her husband taught school there. Her religious beliefs caused much turmoil in her marriage, and, in a drunken stupor, Sullivan enlisted himself as a soldier and left for Cuba in 1740. Later, claiming the Quaker's right to pacifism, he was beaten brutally for his refusal to serve and died in a hospital near London in 1741. Her autobiography ends with Sullivan's death.

=== Indentured Servitude ===
As part of her journey to America, Elizabeth Ashbridge was eventually placed in a cruel household where she lived as an indentured servant. Since she was about to make her first transatlantic passage, Ashbridge was unaware of the dangers involved with an ocean voyage. One of those dangers was the threat of being taken as an indentured servant. Initially, Ashbridge thought a woman she was to accompany to America would be a kind "Gentlewoman" companion; however, before Ashbridge realized that her companion had malicious motives, she was kidnapped and kept aboard a ship for three weeks.

Following her captivity, Ashbridge was still determined to travel to America, and she returned to the ship. Shortly after, Ashbridge learned that some Irish servants had planned a mutiny. In spite of her informing the ship's captain of the planned attack on the crew, Ashbridge was forced into servitude: "The captain caused an indenture to be made, and threatened me with a gaol, if I refused to sign it." Ashbridge lacked the travel funds to make her way across the Atlantic, and the captain took advantage of her misfortune.

Once in America, Ashbridge lived with a hypocritical master who outwardly demonstrated his religious practices; however, he was tyrannical and abusive toward his servant. In one instance, her master requests the service of the "town whipper" to discipline Ashbridge. Although his treatment is cruel, Ashbridge notes, in a moment of confident desperation, "Then, fixing my eyes upon this barbarous man, I said, ‘Sir, . . . if you think that I deserve such punishment, do it yourself." After three years of living under indentured servitude, Ashbridge was able to purchase her freedom by buying out the remaining terms of her contract. Her experience with such difficult circumstances prompted her to question her own belief in God: "I became hardened and was ready to conclude that there was no God." Roxanne Harde examines criticism that suggests that Ashbridge's denying of the master's religious beliefs is an example of how this strong Quaker minister exercises Agency and finds her own religious voice. Ashbridge likely already knew the role her poor financial situation played in obtaining her contract of indentured servitude. Thus she became more financially empowered as a result of the difficult experiences in her master's home. To survive, Ashbridge would sew, and she explains that "when I had Served near three years, I bought off the remainder of my Time & then took to my needle, by which I could maintain my Self handsomely."

=== Rebellion and Reconciliation with Patriarchy ===
At the beginning of Some Account of the Early Part of the Life of Elizabeth Ashbridge, Ashbridge remarks that her father was absent from the Ashbridge household while she growing up. As a surgeon, Mr. Ashbridge "made many long voyages" and left young Elizabeth with her mother. As Ashbridge ages, her mother becomes a "pattern of virtue" for her to follow.

Around the age of twelve, Ashbridge begins to feel conflicting emotions towards religion: she disregards religion, but also has an intense desire to be loved by the Lord. These emotions indicate that Ashbridge correlated "the Lord" with her absent father. She wants to be loved by these paternal figures and is angered that she does not feel such love. At the age of fourteen, Ashbridge rejects patriarchy by abruptly leaving her father's house and entering into an improper marriage. After the death of her husband five months later, her father refuses to accept her back into his household. Her mother sends her to Dublin until she can re-gain her father's affections. In this account, Ashbridge portrays her mother as a welcoming figure, and her father as a repulsive force.

While away from her mother, Ashbridge becomes acquainted with a Catholic widow. She begins to associate this woman as her motherly role model and even begins to adhere to the Catholic faith. They spoke to each other freely about religion, with "each of [them] defending [their] particular tenets." It was these conversations that made Ashbridge curious about Roman Catholicism; she was intrigued by the widow's tales of "such mighty miracles, done by their priests" that Ashbridge "began to be shaken in [her] own belief." Asbridge began to attend mass with the widow because, though interested, she was "yet resolved not blindly to adopt their creed." She reaches the point of conversion, but speaking with the Catholic priest drives her away from the religion. Ashbridge's tone towards the Roman Catholic belief system, though she almost converted, was mostly negative. She calls them "papists," which was a widely used descriptor but was chiefly negative. While she was "not averse" to confessing her sins, she called the recital of beliefs the priest wanted her to swear by "ridiculous" and said they "made [her] sick of [her] new intention." At this point in her spiritual journey, Ashbridge cannot adhere to a religion in which she feels directly influenced by the patriarchal system.

Ashbridge's tendency to seek motherly figures is also shown when she naively trusts the "gentlewoman" who promises her passage to Pennsylvania. After realizing that this woman has betrayed her, Ashbridge refers to her as a "vile creature." At this point in the autobiography, Ashbridge begins to portray women in all of their complexities. Once in America, Ashbridge remarries a man that she does not truly love. Though she never states the exact reason for the marriage, Ashbridge implies that there was some sort of superficial or physical connection that brought the two together.

In her marriage, she feels, once again, the repression of patriarchal rule. In a second blatant rebellion of patriarchy, Ashbridge steps outside of her marriage to pursue her spiritual convictions. In the Quaker religion, Ashbridge finds a sense of community, rather than a patriarchal hierarchy. The Quaker religion welcomed female speakers who were considered spiritually equal to their male counterparts. In this community, Ashbridge finds an escape from male-dominated society. As she continues to attend Quaker meetings, she ceases to associate the Lord with an absent male figure. In her final conversion experience, Ashbridge notes that a woman brings the invitation of salvation to her, as she states: "…there stood a grave woman, holding in her right hand a lamp burning…[she] said, ‘I am sent to tell thee that, if thou wilt return to the Lord thy God, who created thee, he will have mercy on thee…’"

=== Ashbridge's Abusive Second Marriage ===
Ashbridge begins her account by informing the reader that her life has been characterized by hardships and evil, not least of which came at the hand of her second husband, Sullivan. Ashbridge enters the "unaccountable" marriage with a man she "did not esteem" shortly after being released from indentured servitude. Of her second marriage, she states, "I released myself from one cruel servitude, and, in the course of a few months, entered into another for life," an unwise decision which left her to view herself as "ruined". She alludes to unhealthy marital relations from the beginning, and—despite occasional periods of peace—the relationship was most often characterized by unhappiness and abuse. Whereas Ashbridge refers to her first husband as "the darling of my heart", she says of her second husband: "I was in love with nothing I saw in him". Although she describes feeling "more affectionate" toward Sullivan after being baptized and beginning to keep "the true sabbath", this positive statement is one of the very few contained in her autobiographical account. Frequently, Ashbridge relates being victim to verbal and emotional abuse by her husband. After he hears she has "turned Quaker," for example, he tells her he would rather have heard she was dead and shortly thereafter flies "into a rage" at her for using the word "thee". In one particularly disturbing scene he demonstrates physical violence by forcing her to dance with him in front of a group of male friends, despite her resistance and weeping. Eventually, another man has to step in and tell Sullivan to "let your wife alone".

Ashbridge is determined to pursue her Quaker faith, but her husband does all in his power to prevent her. He refuses to let her take his horse to meetings, forcing her to walk the eight miles on foot. When her shoes wore out from so much walking, he refused her a new pair, thinking this would prevent her attendance at meetings. She relates: "finding that all the means he had yet used could not alter my resolutions, he several times struck me with severe blows....Once he came up to me, took out his penknife, and said, 'If you offer to go to meeting to-morrow, with this knife I'll cripple you, for you shall not be a Quaker'". Ultimately, she views her second marriage as "the trial of [her] faith". Fortunately, however, Sullivan eventually abandoned her to military service, died, and she was able to remarry a man who was much more understanding of her religious convictions and aspirations.

== Religion ==
=== Spiritual Autobiography ===
Sometime between the death of her second husband in 1741 and her marriage to Aaron Ashbridge in 1746, Elizabeth Ashbridge recorded the story of her life with focus on her religious experiences and conversion to the Society of Friends. Titled Some Account of the Fore Part of the Life of Elizabeth Ashbridge, her spiritual and historical narrative is the source of the majority of present-day knowledge regarding her early life and religious beliefs. Few records exist regarding her life in colonial America prior to her activism in the Society of Friends. Even the original manuscript of her Account is not accounted for; most later editions are based on the first edition, published in 1774.

Chronologically, Ashbridge's narrative begins with her childhood in England and her subsequent moves to Ireland and America, and ends with the death of her second husband. While dates and names are included in her narrative, much of it is dedicated to her religious experience and her acceptance of the "true" faith. The autobiography traces her childhood in the Church of England, her early experiences with Quaker and Catholic relatives, her brief foray into the Baptist church, and ends with her acceptance of and into the Society of Friends. Such documentation of spiritual and religious journeys were not uncommon among those of the faith at the time. John Woolman's spiritual autobiography was very popular both within the Quaker church and throughout New England. Ashbridge's narrative was first published posthumously in 1774 in Philadelphia, Pennsylvania. In later meetings, Ashbridge encounters William Hammons, a Quaker leader. He becomes the first male figure that Ashbridge notably holds in esteem. Ashbridge seems able to accept any person who comes on the ground of equality established within the Quaker community.

==== Construction of Ashbridge's Spiritual Autobiography ====
While Ashbridge's narrative, Some Account of the Fore Part of the Life of Elizabeth Ashbridge, was not the first text to employ the emerging literary style of the spiritual autobiography, it did help to perpetuate the popularity of the format in the years following her narrative. Ashbridge was at the forefront of writers employing this literary strategy, and would have been conscious of its specific writing style, although she does not explicitly follow its structure verbatim. Her testimony narrates her exposure and acceptance of Quakerism, showing Ashbridge as not "the victim of her fears and doubts, but as an opponent engaged in an extended struggle", which she eventually overcomes. Traditionally, the format of a spiritual autobiography often follows four pre-established stages:

- An account of a sinful youth
- The gradual awakening to spiritual feelings and growing anxiety about the state of one's soul
- Cycles of sin and repentance
- Final conversion experience that is dramatic and convinces the convert they have been singled out by God for salvation

In her own way, Ashbridge addresses each of these stages. As chronicled in the above section, her story begins with details of her youth, including the estrangement from her family due to her first marriage. She also recalls her struggles with religion, and her attempts to reconcile her identity within a certain denomination. This immediately draws reader focus into an awareness of focalization and Ashbridge's internal struggle. The introduction of Ashbridge's second marriage cues the second stage of her spiritual autobiography. Ashbridge writes shortly after accounting her second marriage that "[her] mind was still not satisfied, with regard to religion. [She] had reformed her conduct, so as to be accounted, by those who knew [her], as a sober woman; yet [she] was not content".

In an effort to settle her anxieties, Ashbridge again works to find her identity within religion. She eventually finds this identity within the practice of Quakerism, although she struggles initially to acknowledge herself as a Quaker. Ashbridge's narrative climaxes with her dramatic acceptance and final conversation experience, as written in her narrative:

Laying aside my prejudices, [I] opened my heart to receive the truth; the beauty of which was shown to me ... I had also revealed to me the emptiness of all shadows and types, which, though proper in their day, were now, by the coming of the Son of God, at an end, and everlasting righteousness ... was to be established in the room thereof. I was permitted to see that all I had gone through was to prepare me for this day.

Although Ashbridge's continues to struggle with her husband and his acceptance of her as a Quaker, she finds the religious contentment she so adamantly desired. Her narrative becomes not only a personal account of religious fulfillment, but also a key example of the style and development of the spiritual autobiography. The use of this literary structure would become common amongst writers of the time, creating widely popularized publications. Ashbridge, conscious of this growing trend, configured her own writings to loosely follow this format, but conceptually remained focused on narrating her attempt to overcome her internal struggle.

=== Traveling ministry ===
On May 7, 1746, Elizabeth married Aaron Ashbridge, a well-known member of the Quaker community in Chester County, Pennsylvania. After becoming an authoritative speaker at the Goshen, Pennsylvania Quaker meetings, she appeared with other prominent Quakers such as John Woolman, Jane Fenn Hoskens, and Anthony Benezet at the General Spring Meeting of ministers and elders in Philadelphia in 1752. The signature on the roster, signed March 16, is the only surviving sample of Ashbridge's handwriting. In 1753, she became a recorded minister of the church and, with the consent of her husband, traveled through England and Ireland speaking at meeting houses testifying to her spiritual journey.

== Later years ==
In a note written by Aaron Ashbridge, it is revealed that Ashbridge remarried in 1746. After her marriage to Aaron, Ashbridge became a Quaker minister. In 1753, Ashbridge left for Ireland for a "religious visit", with the consent of her husband. In that year she spoke in England where her converts included Mary Brook. Ashbridge died in Ireland in 1755. Her final days are recorded in an excerpt from a testimony of the National-Meeting of Ireland, concerning Ashbridge, which is included in the published copy of her autobiography.

== Death ==
In Cork, Ireland, Ashbridge fell sick with an unknown illness, attributing her poor health to "bodily hardship in traveling" and "spiritual exercise in mind". After several weeks she proceeded to Waterford, where she again fell ill. She spent three months indisposed at the home of fellow Quaker John Hutchinson. She then continued to Carlow County, where she lodged at the home of Robert Lecky, and died on May 16, 1755. She was buried three days later at the Ballybrumhill burial ground near Fennagh, County Carlow, Ireland.

== Contributions to Women's Writing ==
Many scholars have discussed Ashbridge's contributions to women's writing, some claiming that, to some extent, her "'voice remains firmly indentured' to the patriarchal culture in which she lives," and others citing her as an example of "the importance of life-writing as a tool for female vindication in a patriarchal culture." Her ability to "embrace the interactions of minds, bodies, reason, and emotion" in her writing is often noted as a feminist way of making meaning. While her conversion to Quakerism (a more gender-equal lifestyle and belief system than she was raised with) indicates a triumph over patriarchal society, the multi-faceted way in which she makes meaning marks an important contribution to women's writing in itself. In addition, Ashbridge's spiritual narrative gives us an example of a woman in Early America, not only constructing her "self" on her terms, but also asserting that construction of her "self" into the world and trying to find a way to reconcile the differences presented by her own construction of herself, and the construction of women presented to her by the patriarchal culture in which she lived.

== Notability ==
Although Ashbridge is not the first writer of a spiritual autobiography or the first female Quaker minister, Ashbridge is still a notable figure in early American literature and history. Her "Account," according to some critics, is an interesting example of feminist literature and a unique female voice. The Quaker's belief that men and women are equally responsible for sharing their spiritual stories was somewhat unusual among the faiths present in New England in the eighteenth century. In this way, the Quaker community challenged the dominant culture: in fact, for a time Rhode Island was the sole state in which anti-Quaker legislation did not exist.

== Works cited ==
- Ashbridge, Elizabeth (1807). Some account of the early part of the life of Elizabeth Ashbridge: who died, in the truth's service, at the house of Robert Lecky, in the county of Carlow, Ireland, the 16th of 5th month, 1755. Printed for Benjamin and Thomas Kite, no. 21, South Fourth Street. OCLC 318915940.
- Gildersleeve, D. Britton (2001). "'I Had a Religious Mother': Maternal Ancestry, Female Spaces, and Spiritual Synthesis in Elizabeth Ashbridge's Account". Early American Literature. 36 (3): 371–394. doi:10.1353/eal.2001.0026. JSTOR 25057245. S2CID 162224127. Gale A80748102 Project MUSE 9712.
- Harde, Roxanne (2004). "'I consoled my heart': Conversion Rhetoric and Female Subjectivity in the Personal Narratives of Elizabeth Ashbridge and Abigail Bailey". Legacy. 21 (2): 156–171. doi:10.1353/leg.2004.0030. JSTOR 25679504. S2CID 144070854. Gale A126613453 Project MUSE 174893.
- Levenduski, Cristine (1996). Peculiar Power: A Quaker Woman Preacher in Eighteenth-Century America. Washington, D.C.: Smithsonian Institution. ISBN 1-56098-670-0.
- Shea, Daniel B., ed. (1990). Journeys in New Worlds: Early American Women's Narratives. Madison, WI: University of Wisconsin. ISBN 0-299-12584-X.
- Madden, Etta M. (1999). "Quaker Elizabeth Ashbridge as 'The Spectacle & Discourse of the Company': Metaphor, Synecdoche, and Synthesis". Early American Literature. 34 (2): 171–189. JSTOR 25057160. Gale A55385375.
