= Mary Brook =

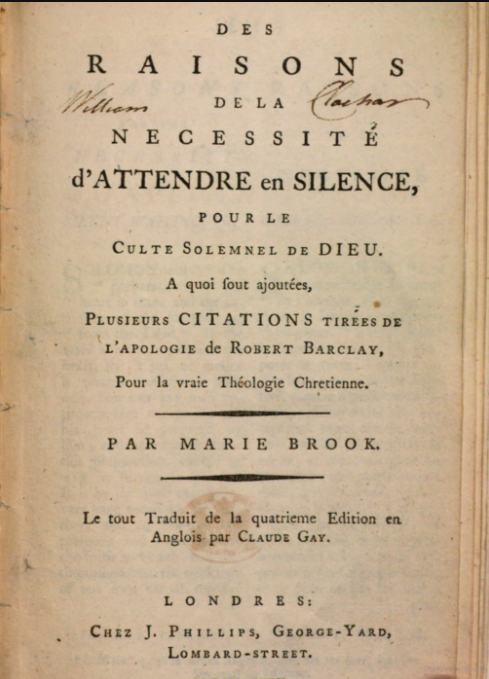
- Her work in a bilingual issue
- Born: 1726/7; Woodstock
- Died: 10 November 1782; Leighton Buzzard
- Occupation: writer

Mary Brook born Mary Brotherton (c.1726 – 10 November 1782) was a British Quaker, preacher and writer.

== Life ==
Brook was born in Woodstock in about 1726. Her parents were Mary and William Brotherton. She was brought up by an aunt who lived in Warwick as a Presbyterian even though her father was an Anglican.

In 1753 she heard the American preacher Elizabeth Ashbridge speak and, after some time and thought, she decided that her love of fashion and fun was incompatible with being a Christian. She adopted the Quaker faith.

By 1759 she was re-united with her mother and living in Hook Norton. On the 18 June she married Joseph Brook who had Yorkshire heritage as his parents Epaphras and Martha came from Shepley. She went to live with him in Leighton Buzzard where he was a wool stapler and a Quaker. In the following year their daughter Hannah was born and a couple of years later their family was complete when (another) Mary was born.

She became a Quaker preacher touring England. She visited the London area between 1766 and 1776 as well as visiting Oxfordshire, Warwickshire and Northamptonshire and York.

In 1774 she published "Reasons for the necessity of silent waiting, in order to the solemn worship of God." Her book creditted and included quotations from the Quaker theologian Robert Barclay's book Apology for the True Christian Divinity published on 1676. Her book enjoyed a wide circulation and it was translated into French and German. It was printed in London, Philadelphia, and Dublin and it had 25 editions. A late edition was in 1877 over 100 years after her original work.

Brook died in 1782 in Leighton Buzzard.
