= Jenny Fenno =

American poet

- Years active: 1780s–1790s
- Known for: Poet; Writer
- Notable work: Original Compositions in Prose and Verse

Jenny Fenno was a poet and religious writer active in Boston during the late 18th century. She is known for her collection of essays and poems Original Compositions in Prose and Verse, published in 1791. The collection is noteworthy for Fenno's assertion of her right to publish and share her writing as a woman.

== Biography ==
Little is known about Fenno's family or early life. She may have been the "Jennet Fenno" who was born in 1765. The preface to Original Compositions reveals she was living in Boston in 1791, and her poem On the Dreadful Conflagration in Boston, in 1787, depicting the Boston Fire of 1787, suggests she had been living there since the 1780s. Original Compositions also contains details of Fenno's illness and near-death, albeit briefly. She writes that God had allowed her to live so she could pursue her writing.

Although her writing implies she may have been single, it is also possible that she was a widow of a husband who died at sea.

Fenno may have been a Baptist as suggested by her poem On the Death of the Rev. Thomas Gair, who was pastor of the Second Baptist Church in Boston. She wrote a number of elegies for the Second Baptist Church, suggesting she was also a member.

Fenno's poetry includes references to John Milton, Isaac Watts and Elizabeth Singer Rowe, demonstrating some degree of literary education. Her choice of subject and style suggest she was part of the middle-class in post-revolutionary New England.

== Writing ==
Fenno is known for her collection of poetry and prose, Original Compositions in Prose and Verse, Subjects Moral and Religious (1791). Fenno begins Original Compositions by defending herself as a woman writer and justifying her intrusion into the sphere of publication. In the preface, Fenno describes that she is sharing her "private thought and reflections" not because of pride, but because she hopes that the "feeble efforts of a young female" will glorify God and benefit the readers.

Original Compositions contains around 70 poems and 15 prose works. Most of the poetry consists of heroic couplets and focuses on themes of "Subjects Moral and Religious", as suggested by the collection's subtitle. Fenno's writing often depicts nature, incorporates scriptural paraphrases, and traditional themes such as death. Influences of early Romanticism, especially graveyard poetry, are identifiable in her work. Her comparison of herself to David through Original Compositions suggests she was aware of her own talent.

As a religious writer, Fenno wrote of the responsibility she felt to her new country after the American Revolution. Original Compositions seeks harmony and the return of order after a period of revolution and rebellion. She concerns herself not just with subjects like death and eternity, but those of the mortal world as well. Secular topics include the limits of language and, national pride, and praise for George Washington. Her writing reflects the Puritan and pre-romantic belief that natural phenomena are "monitors" of timeless truths.
