= Chris Wiltz =

American writer of mystery fiction (born 1948)

Christine Wiltz (born January 3, 1948) is an American writer of mystery fiction. A native of New Orleans, Wiltz attended school at a number of different universities in Louisiana before completing a BA at San Francisco State College in 1969. Prior to becoming a full-time writer she held a number of jobs including advertising, grant writing, selling books, and short-order cooking. She has written four mystery novels featuring Neal Rafferty, a former member of the New Orleans Police Department turned private investigator. She has also written a biography of Norma Wallace, The Last Madam, and a standalone novel, Shoot the Money. Her writing has appeared in the New Yorker and the Los Angeles Times, and has been writer-in-residence and adjunct professor at Tulane University and Loyola University New Orleans. Wiltz is married; she and her husband survived Hurricane Katrina.

== Works ==
Taken from:

=== Neal Rafferty series ===
- The Killing Circle (1981)
- A Diamond Before You Die (1987)
- The Emerald Lizard (1991)

=== Standalone novels ===
- Glass House (1994)
- Shoot the Money (2013)

=== Non-fiction ===
- The Last Madam (2000)
