= Mary Kinnan =

Mary Lewis Kinnan (August 22, 1763 – March 12, 1848) was an American woman held captive by Shawnee from 1791 to 1794, who published an account of her experience in 1795 in the book A true narrative of the sufferings of Mary Kinnan: who was taken prisoner by the Shawnee Nation of Indians on the thirteenth day of May, 1791, and remained with them till the sixteenth of August, 1794.

Kinnan was taken from her Virginia home in a Shawnee raid on her home near the Tygart Valley River in what is now Randolph County, West Virginia. At the time, Great Lakes-area tribes were frequently raiding settlements on the Ohio River in retaliation for British expeditions in the area. Kinnan's husband and daughter were killed in the raid, while Kinnan was sold by the Shawnees to a Delaware tribe, spending three years with them before she was rescued in Detroit by her brother. Her book was published a year later.

Kinnan recounted her story to printer Shepard Kollock, who took down the story, "improved" and published it. Instead of straight historical account, Kinnan's account focuses on her own interior difficulties and the sentimental impact of her journey, claiming that the reader's heart will be "melted with sorrow" in response to Kinnan's story. In doing so, it became the template for later fictional captivity stories that focus on a protagonist's plight and emotions.
