= Jane Fenn Hoskens =

Jane Fenn Hoskens (1694–1764) (also spelled Hoskins) was an American author. She wrote The Life and Spiritual Sufferings of That Faithful Servant of Christ Jane Hoskens, a Public Preacher among the People Called Quakers (1771).

== Early life ==
In 1712, nineteen-year-old Jane Fenn left her home, family, and friends in London to obey an inner voice that said “Go to Pennsylvania!” After arriving in Philadelphia, she was soon cast into debtors’ prison for refusing to sign an indenture dictated by the man who had arranged her passage. Redeemed by a group of Quakers from Plymouth County (Pa.) who wished to employ her as a schoolteacher, she spent three years in their community and began to absorb their teachings and their ways.

== Literary work ==
Hoskens wrote an autobiography. Hoskens's narrative was published posthumously by Quaker printer William Evitt in 1771, titled The Life and Spiritual Sufferings of That Faithful Servant of Christ, Jane Hoskens, a Public Preacher among the People Called Quakers. Hoskens’ narrative is considered the first spiritual autobiography by a Quaker woman published in America. It documents not only her own religious experience, but also the practices of the Quaker communities of early Pennsylvania, and, especially, the importance of the networks of female relationships around which women’s lives revolved.

Her narrative chronicles her inward struggles with her own sense of unworthiness, the temptations of Satan, her distaste of being noticed, and her resistance to speaking in meetings.

== Later life ==
In 1716, she moved to the Quaker community of Haverford, and in 1718 to Chester, where she became the housekeeper and protégé of David Lloyd, a leading Quaker and the chief justice of Pennsylvania. In 1721, she began to travel locally as a minister, in company with Elizabeth Levis. In 1722, the women extended their ministry to Maryland, Virginia, and North Carolina. In 1725, they journeyed to Barbados, Rhode Island, Nantucket, Massachusetts, New York, New Jersey, Maryland, and Virginia. In 1727, with Abigail Bowles, she took the ministry to England and Ireland. Over the next thirty years, she continued to travel the eastern seaboard, speaking in Friends’ meetings and also preaching in public venues. In 1738, she married Joseph Hoskins (d. 1773), a prosperous Quaker merchant of Chester, Pa. On her life and the significance of her narrative, see Michele Lise Tarter, “Jane Fenn Hoskens,” Dictionary of Literary Biography, Volume 200: American Women Prose Writers to 1820, ed. Carla Mulford (Detroit: Gale Research, 1999), pp. 187–194; and Rebecca Larson, Daughters of Light: Quaker Women Preaching and Prophesying in the Colonies and Abroad, 1700–1775 (New York, Alfred A. Knopf, 1999).
