= Mary Eva Kelly =

Irish writer

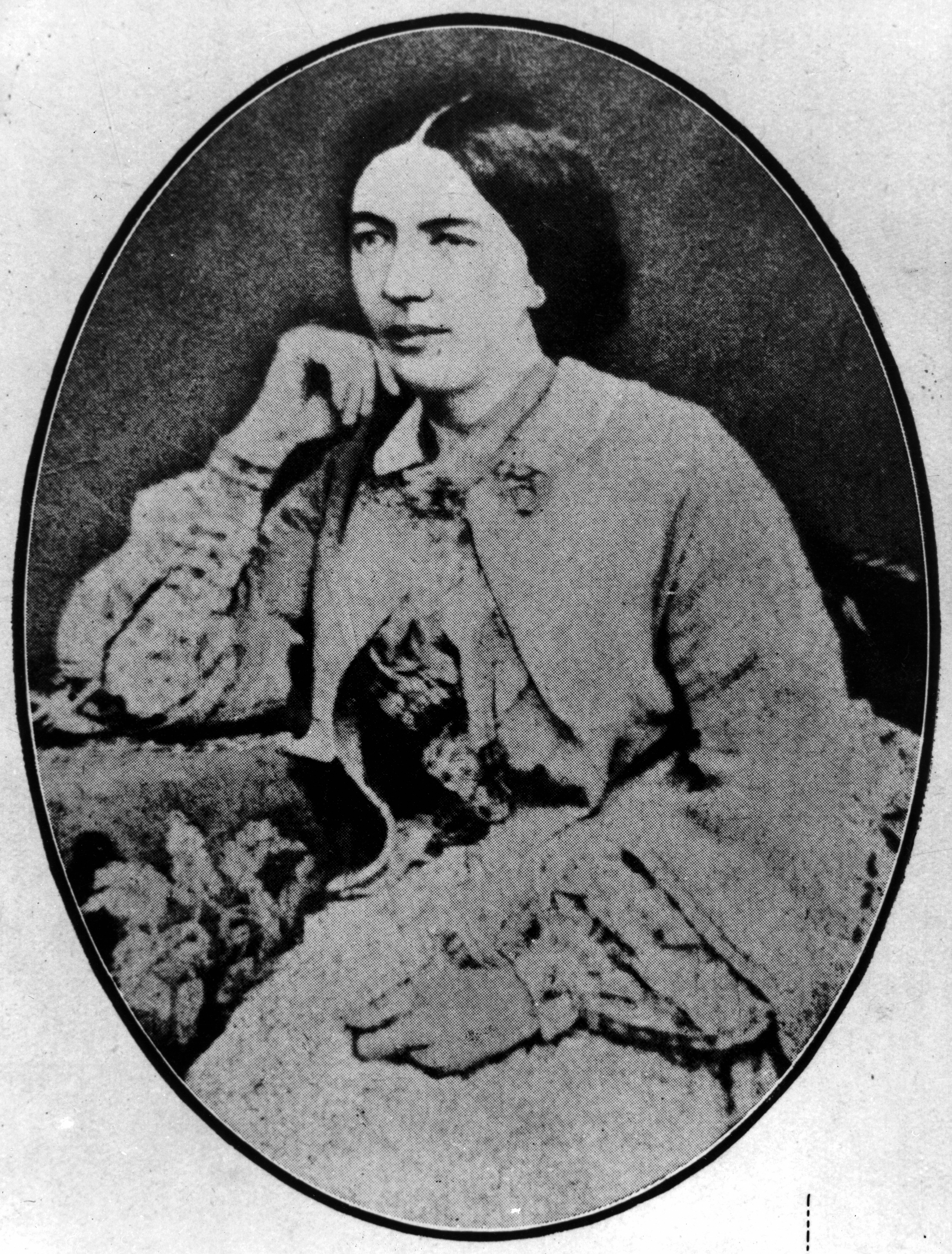
- Born: 1826
- Died: 1910 (aged 83–84)
- Resting place: Toowong Cemetery
- Occupation: Poet
- Writing career
- Genre: Poetry

Mary Eva Kelly (later O'Doherty) (1826–1910) was an Irish-Australian poet and writer who was widely known as "Eva" of "the Nation".

== Biography ==
Born in Headford, County Galway, Ireland, Kelly was educated privately with other members of her family. Her first poems were translations, including one of Alphonse de Lamartine's Dying Christian.

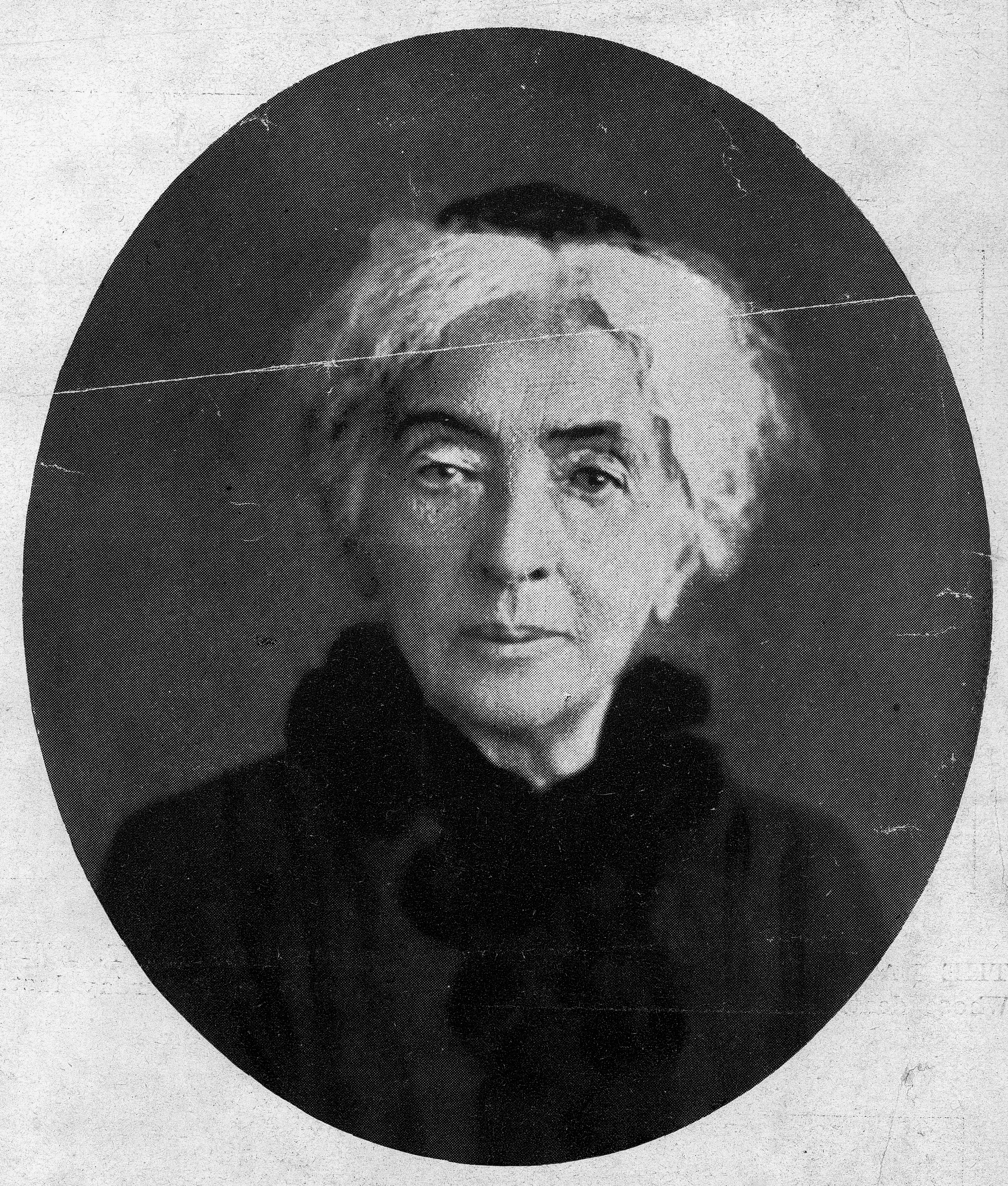
Mary Eva O'Doherty (née Kelly) in old age

Kelly became famous for her contributions to The Nation, the first being "The Banshee". Initially using her own name, she adopted the non-de-plume Eva starting with her "Lament for Davis". She also contributed prose, essays and ballads. She was one of the three most famous women writers for The Nation, who were known as "the Three Graces". During the period that Kelly wrote for the Nation, she interacted with Olivia Knight, who was known as "Thomasine of the Nation".

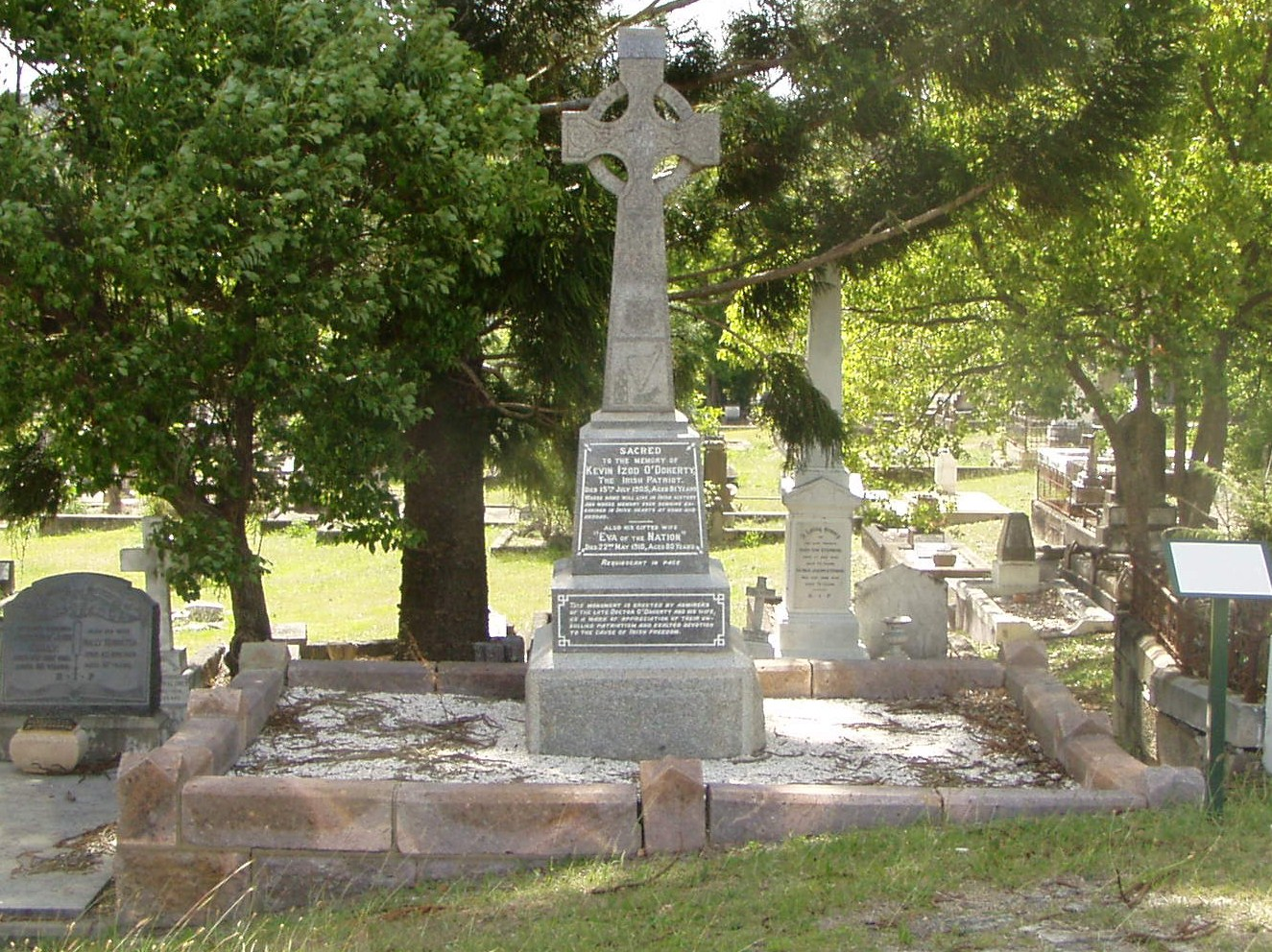
The grave of Kevin and Mary O'Doherty at Brisbane's Toowong Cemetery

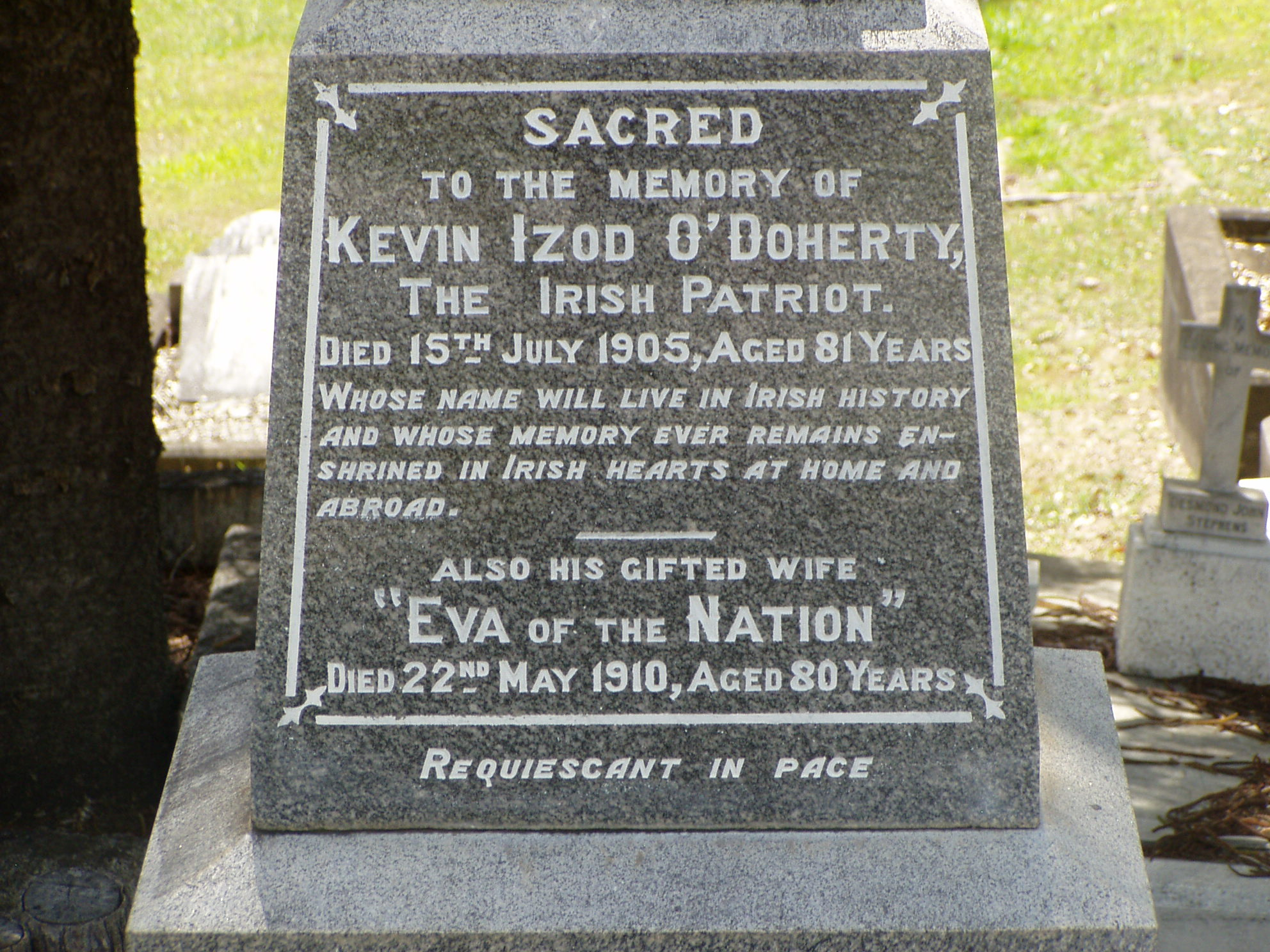

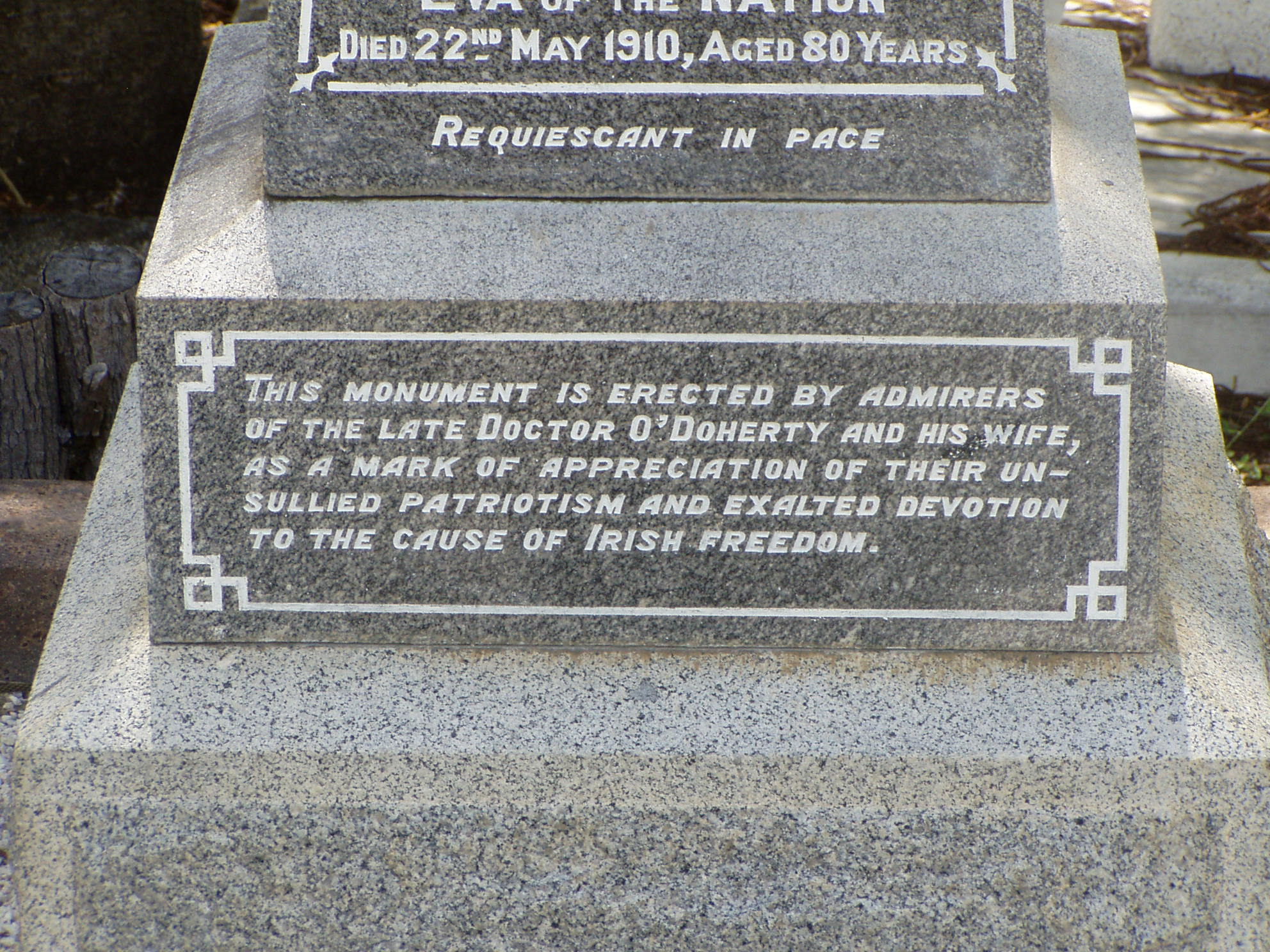

In 1848, Kelly met Kevin Izod O'Doherty who was in prison for his radical politics. She married him in 1855 at Kingstown. He practised in Dublin successfully, and in 1862 they went to Brisbane, Australia and he became well known as one of its leading physicians. In 1885 they returned to England, where O'Doherty was elected MP for North Meath. They returned to Brisbane in 1886.

Much has been written about the romance of Mary and Kevin.

Mary Eva O'Doherty died at Rosalie, Brisbane on 21 May 1910 and was buried in Toowong Cemetery.

Mary's grandson Kevin Louis Vincent O'Doherty was killed in action at Dernancourt on 5 April 1918. Her granddaughter Isabel Maud Mignon O'Doherty married actor Thomas Hunter Nesbitt on 30 April 1919 in Brompton, London.

== Bibliography ==
- Poems by Eva of the Nation (Mary Eva Kelly), San Francisco, Thomas, 1877.
- Poems by Eva of the Nation (Mary Eva Kelly), edited by Séamas MacManus, with a biographical sketch by Justin McCarthy, Dublin, 1090.
- Christine Kinealy, Repeal and Revolution. 1848 in Ireland (Manchester UP, 2009)
