= Sheila Radley =

English mystery novel writer (1928–2017)

Sheila Mary Robinson (November 18, 1928 – 2017) was an English author of mystery novels. She is perhaps most known for her Inspector Douglas Quantrill series that she published under the name Sheila Radley. She also wrote under the pseudonym Hester Rowan.

== Biography ==
Sheila Mary Robinson was born November 18, 1928, in Cogenhoe, Northamptonshire, England. She attended Bedford College, University of London, and earned a Bachelor of Arts in history, graduating in 1951. She served in the Women's Royal Air Force from 1951 to 1960. Before the publication of her novels, she worked in advertising, education, and postal work. She also owned a store.

Her first novel, Overture in Venice, was published in 1976. Her final novel, Fair Game, was published in 1994.

=== Personal life and death ===
Robinson was a member of the Church of England. She was politically "right of centre". Robinson died in 2017.

== Selected works ==
=== Under pseudonym Hester Rowan ===
- Overture in Venice. Collins (London), 1976.
- The Linden Tree. Collins (London), 1977.
- Snowfall. Collins (London). 1978, published in the US as Alpine Encounter. Scribner (New York, NY), 1979.

=== Inspector Douglas Quantrill series ===
- Fate Worse Than Death. Constable, 1985, Scribner, 1986.
- Who Saw Him Die? Constable, 1987, Scribner, 1988.
- This Way Out. Constable, 1989, Scribner, 1990.
- Cross My Heart and Hope to Die. Scribner, 1992.
- Death and the Maiden. Hamilton (London), 1978, published as Death in the Morning, Scribner (New York, NY), 1979.
- The Chief Inspector's Daughter. Scribner, 1980.
- A Talent for Destruction. Scribner, 1982.
- Blood on the Happy Highway. Constable (London), 1983, published as The Quiet Road to Death, Scribner, 1984.
- Fair Game. Constable, 1994.
