= Abigail Watson =

- Born: Abigail Craven; 30 January 1685; Limerick
- Died: 11 November 1752 (aged 67); Fenagh, County Leitrim
- Known for: Ministry
- Spouses: Boles; Watson

Abigail Watson or Abigail Boles; Abigail Craven (30 January 1685 – 11 November 1752) was an Irish Quaker minister who toured Britain and the colonies.

== Life ==
Watson was born in Limerick in 1685. Her parents were Dorothy and Alderman James Craven. Her father had been to jail twice for his Quaker faith. Watson herself was inspired by a local Quaker named Elizabeth Head and Watson became a minister and she was regarded as one of the best female speakers. She travelled widely and her first visit to Britain was in 1712 with Head. She did not marry until she was 35 when she married John Boles in 1719 who had lost his wife. John was rich and the Quaker meetings were held at their home. Boles died in 1731. She was to travel to America twice and Britain five times. On her 1735 tour of Kent, Sussex, and Surrey with Mary Weston and Elizabeth Head she was later joined by Samuel Watson. She had married Watson earlier that year. Watson was another rich gentleman farmer. Her last visit was in 1748 when she had to sit while preaching. She retired in 1751 feeling that her work was done.

Watson died in Fenagh, County Leitrim in 1752. She had never had her own children but she had been step-mother to many of her husband's children.
