= Sophia Hume =

American author and preacher

Sophia Wigington Hume (South Carolina, 1702 – London, 1774) was an American author and preacher associated with the Quakers.

She was the author of books written to offer guidance to Quakers on a variety of topics including theology, philosophy, and personal ethics. She is significant as an early example of influential women whose non-fiction writings were addressed to a wide audience regardless of the sex of the reader.

Given the wealth of her writings that survive and which are now beginning to become widely available as online resources, there is a puzzling lack of scholarship on Hume. One article by Phyllis Mack of Rutgers University is not focused specifically on Hume, but does discuss her place in both Quaker history and the larger contexts of women writers and feminism.

== Works ==
The known writings of Sophia Hume include:

- An Exhortation to the Inhabitants of the Province of South-Carolina, to Bring their Deeds to the Light of Christ, in their Own Consciences (Philadelphia: Printed by B. Franklin & D. Hall, 1748; Bristol, England: Printed by Samuel Farley, 1750).
- An Epistle to the Inhabitants of South Carolina, Containing Sundry Observations Proper to be Considered by Every Professor of Christianity in General (London: Luke Hinde, 1754).
- Extracts from Divers Ancient Testimonies of Friends and Others (London: Luke Hinde, 1760?; Wilmington, Del.: Printed by James Adams, 1766).
- A Caution to Such as Observe Days and Times, to which is Added, an Address to Magistrates, Parents, Masters of Families, Etc. (London, 1760; Newport, R.I.: Printed & sold by Solomon Southwick, 1771).
- A Short Appeal to Men and Women of Reason: Distinguished by Titles of Worldly Honour, or by Riches Exclusive of Titles: Who May be Walking According to the Course of this Evil World, Living in the Pleasures thereof, and Frequenting Theatres, Balls, Etc.; (Bristol, England: Printed by E. Farley, 1765).
- Remarks on the Practice of Inoculation for the Smallpox, second edition (London: 1767).
