= Sarah Osborn =

American evangelical author (1714–1796)

Sarah Osborn (February 22, 1714 – August 2, 1796) was an early American Protestant and Evangelical writer who experienced her type of "religious awakening" during the birth of American Evangelicalism and, through her memoirs, served as a preacher.

Osborn wrote about her experience during the First Great Awakening, reviving aspects of religion and a spiritual pilgrimage. She advised everyone to seek spiritual rebirth and called for a personal salvation experience.

She would eventually go on to write a series of memoirs, which were later preserved by Samuel Hopkins, entitled Memoirs of the Life of Mrs. Sarah Osborn, Who Died in Newport, on the Second Day of August 1796. First written in 1742 at the age of 29 as a way to deal with life's difficulties, she quickly became aware of her work's value, and later "emerged as the leader of a remarkable religious revival that brought as many as five hundred people—including large numbers of slaves—to her house each week."

Sarah Osborn died in Newport, Rhode Island, on August 2, 1796, at 82.

== Early life ==
Sarah Osborn was born in London on February 22, 1714, by Benjamin and Susanna (Guyse) Haggar. At eight years old, her family moved to New England. Later, permanently residing in Rhode Island as a teenager.

Osborn was raised in a religious household and devoted her childhood to learning about Puritanism. Dedicated to the teachings of Nathaniel Clap, a preacher who believed in personal holiness, Osborn stood independent from her parents' wishes to maintain the religion of The Second Church. Thus, she disapproved of her teenage actions.

During her teenage years, Osborn reflected on her sinfulness and her conversion. She considered herself a “feeble worthless worm,” “guilty,” “wretched,” “a monster in sin,” and “worthless.” This led Osborn to feel despair and eventually struggle with suicidal thoughts. Osborn carried these thoughts and specific beliefs about herself throughout her adult life.

At seventeen years old, Osborn eloped and married Samuel Wheaten. With Wheaten, she had her only biological son. Samuel Wheaton tragically died and left her a widow and a single mother. Osborn later married Henry Osborn, a widower with three children with his previous spouse, and the couple raised four kids together. Tragically, her biological son died at the age of eleven. Her personal decisions, with her marriage, led Osborn to fall into poverty in her young adult life. To stay afloat, Osborn became a seamstress and a schoolteacher.

== Spiritual pilgrimage and evangelical work ==
When Osborn was admitted to the First Church in 1737, she began to explore her spirituality more deeply. While experiencing personal hardships, she started the “Religious Female Society,” which focused on keeping the church alive.

Known as the “Protestant saint,” Osborn used prayer and her personal experience to describe her relationship with God. Osborn was closely aligned with Calvinist beliefs and criticized other denominations that were either too relaxed or too strict in their interpretation of God. Her strong opinions against other denominations allowed her to form her thoughts. Osborn with the language used by other creatures and the influence of the Enlightenment, Osborn began to preach on her own. Osborn focused on using one's personal experience as evidence of God's mercy. Enclosed within her diary are the musings of a troubled and complicated woman who experienced a great deal of hardship and, in turn, wanted to show that her life had meaning through the "grace of God."

One of Osborn's senses of security was her diaries. In her diary entries, Osborn wrote every single detail of her life. In these details, she saw how God acted in her life. Through all the trials and tribulations Osborn wrote about, she describes her life as “evidence of God.” Her background in experiencing poverty through her late husband, encountering the death of her child, depression, and chronic illness made her realize the truth of God. Her experience allowed her to see that God has given her the difficulty of life to test her loyalty to Him. She believed that God would never have failed her, which led her to be able to be reminded of His power. Osborn used her personal experience as evidence to affirm God's glory. Osborn used her struggles to preach this to those who were also spiritually devoid. Overall, her diaries were central to her teachings.

Newport, Rhode Island, was a famous harbor for slave trading and was known to be religiously tolerant. In 1764, Osborn began holding religious meetings in her household. Due to the diversity in Newport, Osborn attracted many to her teachings and prayers. Over five hundred twenty-five people attended her weekly meetings. This included a hundred or more enslaved people, which is about one-tenth of Newport's slave population. Osborn specified seven days when different demographic groups would come through her doors. To avoid the scandal of “keeping a Negro House,” different groups came through her doors on five of the seven days. With all her meetings, she wrote detailed notes about everything that occurred. Osborn listed how many people attended her meetings, how they reacted, and how many were born again. Her interracial meetings allowed Osborn to influence many slaves, such as Occramar Marycoo, to read, write, and preach.

Osborn's opinions on slavery were questioned because of her consistent exposure to slaves. Joseph Fish, a ministerial advisor, questioned her house meetings that regularly welcomed slaves. In her response, she advocated for the spread of the Word to all mouths and ears. She reassured Fisher that she would never uplift the slaves in any way but would continue to take pleasure in sharing her work. With the continual work of the teachings to the slaves, Sarah Osborn eventually understood the monstrous stories behind slavery and was an advocate for abolition.

Osborn formed devotional groups in adulthood, encouraging group prayers and expressing the Spirit of God. Forming the Religious Female Society in the seventeenth century, she welcomed women concerned for their spiritual souls and would aid in fostering them to salvation through faith. As a schoolteacher, Osborn was able to spread her beliefs to her students and welcome them to her home. Osborn's ability to preach to women became so popular that she traveled across southern New England to speak at religious meetings. Her evangelical work in Newport spread across New England and was said to have revived hundreds of women and men.

== The Enlightenment ==
The Enlightenment significantly influenced secular and religious societies. Secularly, it provided new thoughts on science, freedom, and critical thinking. Religiously, churches drew from the same ideas. However, thinkers during this time used Enlightenment thought to counter these secular ideas against religion. The Enlightenment was general. Philosophers and thinkers should have their ideas portrayed in general society. Elite thinkers such as John Locke, Benjamin Franklin, and John Adams. These enlightenment thinkers have revolutionized many social and cultural norms in America.

One of the main consequences of the Enlightenment on evangelicalism is the belief in humanism—the belief that every human is born with human goodness and that we are all saved by God. Humanism provides an optimistic view for believers and boasts individualism, which Sarah Osborn rejected. Osborn saw that there would be no focus on God if salvation comes from the individual. Similarly, Arminianism also took root in evangelicalism. Arminianism agreed on God's sovereignty but allowed humans to be able to form their destiny. Humanism and Arminianism stemmed and personified through the Enlightenment period because they rationalized human thinking for themselves. Sarah Osborn rejected these theological ideas. While she appreciated the Enlightenment's push on evidence, she believed that God was sovereign over all things as we are to fully devote our life to God, as He is the one who has predestined believers to eternal faith in the end.

Generally, the ideas of the Enlightenment were male-dominated. The Enlightenment was created with the male perspective. So, The Enlightenment reinforced the ideas of male culture and was a prominent platform for elite men to share their thoughts. With the modern concepts of human reasoning and individualism, sexism, imperialism, and racism became more prominent. Generally, women tended to reinforce the ideas that the Enlightenment's elite thinkers were portraying. At the same time, some women, such as Mary Woolstonecraft, debated these masculine values.

In congruence, cases of the Enlightenment increased the purpose of religion. Because the Enlightenment discussed personal experience and having evidence and reasoning for life, many evangelicals like Osborn found a sense of security in the Enlightenment language as they used scientific language to affirm religious values. Affirming the Bible as a firsthand experience is a carrier for personal experience.

The language of the Bible was the foundation for personal experience. One of the main strengths of the Enlightenment's consequence on religion was the purpose of women. The Bible significantly states the role of women. Women were meant to serve their husbands and be called to religious service. Osborn specifically drew from this. Osborn believed that woman had experiences that are different and can be used to form community.

== The Great Awakening ==
The Great Awakening was a religious revival movement in the Americas during the 1730s and 1740s that included emotional preaching, personal experience, and salvation through grace. Greatly influenced by Jonathan Edwards and George Whitefield, it shared its importance in a second rebirth, something Osborn appealed to. The influence of the Awakening led to the formation of a new sector of the congregation: The New Light and the Old Light.

Sarah Osborn, too, had a great awakening. With the Enlightenment, liberal evangelism preached humanism, and human goodness was a belief Osborn could not agree with. Personal salvation was the only way to be saved. Osborn's personal experience with The Great Awakening allowed her to think more deeply about the languages used during preaching and the role of feminine tradition. Reflecting on the Enlightenment, Osborn grew deeper into her theological understanding. She was able to form arguments on the debates of salvation and humanness.

In addition to strengthening her theological understanding, Osborn felt called to spread her knowledge. Using personal experience and the teachings of Jonathan Edwards, George Whitefield, and Gilbert Tennent, Sarah Osborn worked under the First Church in forming revival groups, bringing together New Light and New Divinity Christians. In the 1760s, Osborn established the Religious Female Society in the seventeenth century, encouraging women to be weary of their spiritual souls. In this society, women prayed and acted as interim preachers in the First Church.

Sarah Osborn's leadership as a woman in the Church was significant. Among great male preachers like Jonathan Edwards and George Whitefield, she was able to connect to many backgrounds. Her role as a “born-again woman” during the First Great Awakening promoted ideas in the Second Great Awakening in the 1800s, such as women's rights, world missions, temperance, and abolition.

The First Great Awakening solidified Sarah Osborn's theology and allowed her to become a prominent figure in New England.

== Late life ==
Sarah Osborn's memoirs and diaries have been published with great thanks to Samuel Hopkins, a New Light pastor. The publication of Osborn's personal work provided evidence for God's existence and encouraged forthcoming ideas in the Second Great Awakening. Ideas such as economic poverty, personal experience, abolition, women's roles, and missions.

Osborn experienced chronic illnesses, was almost blind, was unable to walk, and was entirely confined to her house. Despite all the physical hardships in her life, Sarah Osborn was undoubtful of God's love and used her tragedies as a gift of grace for her life, constantly reminded by the diary entries she used as evidence for God. At the age of 82, in 1796, Sarah Osborn passed away.
