= Recorded Minister =

Quaker acknowledged to have a gift of spoken ministry

A Recorded Minister was originally a male or female Quaker (that is, a member of the Religious Society of Friends), who was acknowledged to have a gift for spoken ministry.

The practice of recording in a Monthly Meeting Minute the acknowledgment that a Friend had a gift of spoken ministry began in the 1730s in London Yearly Meeting, according to Milligan's Biographical dictionary of British Quakers in commerce and industry. The acknowledgment did not involve anything like ordination or any payment, in view of early Friends' testimony against "Hireling Priests". Acknowledgment did permit the Recorded Minister to attend at Yearly Meeting and Meeting for Sufferings.

The Quaker practice of "waiting worship" called for sitting in silence listening for Divine guidance for what, if anything, would be shared aloud. Such gatherings did not require planning, and in fact, disdained it as being "of man" instead "of God." In the 19th century, however, a third wave of Evangelicalism swept through North America, with its proponents holding week-long (or longer) "revival" meetings near cities and small towns across the Midwest. Some Friends, especially younger people, attended these revivals and began to adopt elements of worship they experienced, such as singing and reading the Bible aloud, etc. In the last decade of the 19th century, such Quaker meetings also began to hire ministers. Eventually, Quaker meetings influenced by Evangelicalism followed a pre-planned program or "order of worship," which led to their being called "Programmed Friends." They did not, however, give up the practice of recording ministry. Quaker ministers among Programmed Friends are not called "ordained" ministers, but "recorded ministers," because their gifts of ministry have been recognized and recorded by their Monthly Meeting, which recommends the person's gifts of ministry be recorded by the Quarterly Meeting and by their Yearly Meeting. Today, Friends may be recorded in acknowledgment of a variety of ministries, including teaching, chaplaincy, and evangelical and pastoral ministry.

Quaker congregations who do not have paid ministers nor programs are called "Unprogrammed Friends," and they practice the silent, waiting worship of the earliest Friends. "Most unprogrammed Friends around the world have given up the practice of recording -- or they never had it, as in the case of the newer yearly meetings." For example, in London Yearly Meeting the practice of recording Ministers was discontinued in 1924.

== See also ==
- Daughters of Light: Quaker Women Preaching and Prophesying in the Colonies and Abroad, 1700-1775
- Category: Quaker ministers
