= Michele Wallace =

American feminist author (born 1952)

Michele Faith Wallace
- Born: January 4, 1952 (age 74); Harlem, New York City, United States
- Education: City College of New York
- Occupations: Author, professor, cultural critic
- Spouse: Eugene Nesmith (m. 1989–2001)
- Parent: Faith Ringgold (mother)
- Writing career
- Notable works: Black Macho and the Myth of the Superwoman (1979); Invisibility Blues: From Pop to Theory (1990)

Michele Faith Wallace (born January 4, 1952) is an American Black feminist author, cultural critic, and daughter of artist Faith Ringgold. She is best known for her 1979 book Black Macho and the Myth of the Superwoman. Wallace's writings on literature, art, film, and popular culture have been widely published and have made her a leader of African-American intellectuals. She is a Professor of English at the City College of New York and the Graduate Center of the City University of New York (CUNY).

== Early life ==
Michele Faith Wallace was born on January 4, 1952, in Harlem, New York. She and her younger sister Barbara grew up in a Black middle-class family. Her mother is Faith Ringgold, who was a teacher and college lecturer before becoming a widely exhibited artist. Her father, Robert Earl Wallace, was a classical and jazz pianist. Her parents separated after four years of marriage. Her father died of a drug overdose when Wallace was 13, and her later clashes with her mother led to her being sent to a Catholic reform school for several weeks as a child. Michele and her sister were later raised by their mother and stepfather Burdette "Birdie" Ringgold in Harlem's exclusive Sugar Hill district.

Wallace went to private school and spent summers at camp or in Europe. She attended elementary school at Our Savior Lutheran Church, before transferring to the progressive New Lincoln School, where David Rieff and Shari Belafonte were among her classmates. Wallace cites her time at New Lincoln as one of her first experiences with radical politics.

Wallace graduated from high school in 1969 and enrolled at Howard University in Washington, D.C., for fall the same year. She spent a semester at Howard, before returning to Harlem. Back in New York City in the spring of 1970, she organized with her mother around anti-war, anti-imperialist art movements of the time and attended night school at the City College of New York. During this time, she and her mother founded Women Students and Artists for Black Art Liberation (WSABAL), an organization that advocated for the inclusion of women of color's voices in the art world. In 1973, she co-founded the National Black Feminist Organization with Faith Ringgold, Margaret Sloan-Hunter, and other prominent Black feminist activists. Wallace earned her B.A. in English and Creative Writing from City College in 1974.

== Career ==
From 1974 to 1975, Wallace worked at Newsweek as a book review researcher. During this period she contributed to Ms. magazine from time to time. In 1974, she met Ross Wetzsteon and Karen Durbin of The Village Voice and began writing for the publication on Black feminism, her upbringing in Harlem in the 1950s and '60s, and her position in the Black middle-class educated elite. Wallace's articles in The Voice brought her prominence as a Black feminist in New York.

In 1975, she quit her job at Newsweek after receiving an advance for a book draft that would eventually become Black Macho and the Myth of the Superwoman. She spent the next two years writing and editing this book. Low on money at the time, Wallace took on a job as an instructor in journalism at New York University in 1976, later becoming an assistant professor of English. Black Macho and the Myth of the Superwoman was published by Dial Press in 1979. Wallace was Essence magazine's Editor at Large in 1983. From 1995 to 1996, she was a columnist for The Village Voice.

Wallace currently teaches at the City College of New York and the Graduate Center of the City University of New York (CUNY). In addition to her B.A. degree in English and Creative Writing, she holds a M.A. in English from City College (1990) and a Ph.D. in Cinema Studies from New York University (1999). She has taught at numerous institutions, including Rutgers University and Cornell University. Her writing appears in many notable anthologies, among them All the Women Are White, All the Blacks Are Men, But Some of Us Are Brave (1982, co-edited by Akasha Gloria Hull, Patricia Bell-Scott and Barbara Smith), Reading Black, Reading Feminist (1990, edited by Henry Louis Gates Jr.), and Daughters of Africa (1992, edited by Margaret Busby).

== Black Macho and the Myth of the Superwoman ==
=== Overview ===
Black Macho and the Myth of the Superwoman, published in 1979, criticizes sexism in the Black community and Black nationalism in the 1960s. The book grapples with twin stereotypes of the Black man and woman—Black macho, the hypermasculine and hypersexualized Black man, and superwoman, the inordinately strong Black woman unfazed by white racism. The book criticizes Black men and the Civil Rights Movement for its injurious acceptance of white society's notion of manhood. This, according to Wallace, has resulted in a divide between Black women and men. Combining personal anecdotes with social, cultural, and historical analysis, Wallace also reflects on her subject position as an educated middle-class Black woman. A pre-publication excerpt of Black Macho and the Myth of the Superwoman appeared in the January 1979 issue of Ms. magazine.

=== Black feminism ===
Though Wallace's editor refused to associate the book with feminism of any kind, Black Macho and the Myth of the Superwoman is a prime example of Black feminist writing. Recognizing Black women as the lowest of the low in American society, Wallace argued that Black women suffered specific injustices based on the intersection of their race and gender. Black women could not find complete solidarity with Black men or white women. According to Wallace, Black men blamed Black women for their persecution during slavery, and white women were unable to understand the specific problems of Black women. In Black Macho, Wallace is most concerned with Black men's betrayal of Black women. By dating white women and encouraging Black women's submission, Black men reinforced Black female oppression on the basis of both race and gender.

=== Critical reception ===
Former Ms. magazine editor Gloria Steinem proclaimed Black Macho and the Myth of the Superwoman as the book that would "shape the 80s". In the wake of its publication, Black Macho stirred much controversy. Wallace's blasting of patriarchal culture in the Black community and the Black Power movement has been called divisive. The work was criticized by intellectuals, political figures, and feminists including Angela Davis and even Wallace's mother Faith Ringgold, who ultimately wrote a book in response. A review of Black Macho in The Village Voice called Wallace's book "an elusive work... [whose] pages offer autobiography, historical information, sociology, and mere opinion dressed up to resemble analysis. It is a polemic, seriously felt, sometimes scathing, often repetitious." Many critics of the book offered similar evaluations by questioning Wallace's character and intellectual capabilities. Criticisms were published in The New York Times, Freedomways, and Time among other publications.

In the same year that Black Macho was released, The Black Scholar published an essay by Robert Staples called "The Myth of Black Macho: A Response to Angry Black Feminists". The essay derides Black Macho for its portrayal of Black men and its attack on Black malehood. Staples also criticized the book for not including a male voice. The following issue of The Black Scholar, titled "The Black Sexism Debate" (1979), was dedicated to discussing Black Macho, along with Ntozake Shange's For Colored Girls Who Have Considered Suicide When the Rainbow Is Enuf (1975). This issue featured responses to Staples from prominent Black scholars and activists including June Jordan, Maulana Karenga, and Audre Lorde. Opponents of Black Macho disputed the severity of sexism in the Black community and the priority it should have in Black liberation, citing racism as a more serious concern.

Despite the overwhelming hostility it initially faced, Black Macho has been celebrated, especially in contemporary times, for its fearless demystification of stereotypes and critical feminist analysis of Black nationalism.

== Invisibility Blues: From Pop to Theory ==
=== Overview ===
Invisibility Blues: From Pop to Theory, first published in 1990 and considered a landmark in the history of Black feminism, highlights the work of her mother, artist Faith Ringgold, and then moves on to examining Wallace's own life growing up in Harlem, the Black experience, and her life later as a writer in the 1970s. In addition, Wallace explores the continued underrespresentation of Black voices in politics, media, and culture and further addresses the tensions between race, class, gender, and society while also highlighting figures such as Zora Neale Hurston, Toni Cade Bambara, Toni Morrison, and Alice Walker. This social commentary, including a total of 24 essays written from 1972 to 1990, aims to highlight the experiences of Black women in American culture from a different viewpoint from that of white middle-class feminists.

== Black Popular Culture ==
=== Overview ===
Black Popular Culture, published in 1992, discusses a wide range of cultural issues and critical theory, including urban planning to literature. Additionally, the book was recognized as a Village Voice Best Book of the Year.

== Passing, Lynching and Jim Crow: A Genealogy of Race and Gender in U.S. Visual Culture ==
=== Overview ===
This dissertation published in 1999, focuses on examining race and gender ideologies at the turn of the century generated by U.S. imperialism and the world's fair movement as manifested in visual culture, especially visual art, popular culture and cinema. The first half of this dissertation explores trends in visual culture within the United States wherein the second half focuses on the emergence of Afro-American and Black images in silent cinema including various film versions of Uncle Tom's Cabin, D. W. Griffith's The Birth of a Nation and Oscar Micheaux's Within Our Gates. This dissertation explicates white supremacist terms adapted from a plantation slavery context, which generated the criteria of racial hierarchy and the proclivity towards lynching as an expression of its greatest failure and also discusses the responses of Black intellectuals W. E. B. Du Bois, Booker T. Washington, Ida B. Wells, Mary Church Terrell and Anna J. Cooper to the formulation of these social and cultural restrictions and limitations imposed upon the descendants of former slaves. Combinations of race and gender) are concretized in visual imagery in fine art, illustration, material culture, photography, performance and practices of human display in natural history museums, zoos, and world's fairs.

== Dark Designs and Visual Culture ==
=== Overview ===
Dark Designs and Visual Culture, published in 2004, is a collection containing more than fifty articles that Michele Wallace wrote over the previous 15 years, including some of her most notable pieces as well as interviews conducted about her work. Dark Designs and Visual Culture charts the development of a Black feminist consciousness and brings the scope of Wallace's career into focus. Wallace begins the collection with a reflection of her life and career through essays and articles focused on popular culture, as well as literary theory, and issues in Black visual culture ranging from the historical tragedy of the Hottentot Venus, an African woman displayed as a curiosity in 19th-century Europe, to films that sexualize the Black body—such as The Watermelon Woman (1996), Gone with the Wind (1939), and Paris Is Burning (1990). Wallace goes on to discuss life growing up in Harlem, her relationship with her mother Faith Ringgold, and how she dealt with the media attention and criticism she received for her 1979 work Black Macho and the Myth of the Superwoman.

== Awards and fellowships ==
- "Modernism, Postmodernism and The Problem of The Visual in Afro-American Culture", PSC-CUNY Creative Incentive Award, University Committee on Research, City University of New York (1991)
- "The Problem of The Visual in Afro-American Film", Eisner Fellowship, City College of New York (1991)
- Artists' Fellowship: Nonfiction Literature, New York Foundation for the Arts (1991)
- "The Problem of The Visual in African-American Film", Eisner Fellowship, City College of New York (1993)
- The Blanche, Edith and Irving Laurie New Jersey Chair in Women's Studies at Douglass College, Rutgers University (1996–1997)
- Lifetime Achievement Award of Journalism Alumni, City College of New York (2008)

== Select bibliography ==
=== Books ===
- Black Macho and the Myth of the Superwoman (1979), ISBN 978-1859842966
- Faith Ringgold: Twenty Years of Painting, Sculpture and Performances (ed. 1984)
- Invisibility Blues: From Pop To Theory (1990), ISBN 978-1859844878
- Black Popular Culture, with Gina Dent (1993), ISBN 978-1565844599
- Passing, Lynching and Jim Crow: A Genealogy of Race and Gender in U.S. Visual Culture, 1895–1929 (1999)
- Dark Designs and Visual Culture (2004), ISBN 978-0822334132
- Declaration of Independence, Fifty Years of Art by Faith Ringgold (2009)
- American People, Black Light: Faith Ringgold's Paintings of the 1960's (2010)

=== Essays ===
- "Michael Jackson, Black Modernisms and 'The Ecstasy of Communication'", Global Television (1989), ISBN 978-0262691239
- "Race, Gender and Psychoanalysis in Forties Film: 'Lost Boundaries,' 'Home of the Brave' and 'The Quiet One'", Black American Cinema (1993), ISBN 978-0415903974
- "The Search for the 'Good Enough' Mammy: Multiculturalism, Popular Culture and Psychoanalysis", Multiculturalism: A Critical Reader (1994), ISBN 978-0631189121
- "Anger in Isolation: A Black Feminist's Search for Sisterhood", Words of Fire: An Anthology of African-American Feminist Thought (1995), ISBN 978-1565842564
- "Black Female Spectatorship and The Dilemma of Tokenism", Generations: Academic Feminists in Dialogue (1997)
- "Uncle Tom's Cabin: Before and After the Jim Crow Era", TDR: The Drama Review (2000)
- "The Enigma of the Negress Kara Walker", Kara Walker: Narratives of a Negress (2003), ISBN 978-0262025409
- "The Imperial Gaze: The Venus Hottentot", Black Venus 2010: They Called Her "Hottentot" (2010), ISBN 978-1439902059

== See also ==
- bell hooks
- Black Arts Movement
- Black feminism
- Faith Ringgold
- Intersectionality
- Misogynoir
- Ntozake Shange
