= Jeannie G. Pool =

American composer and author (born 1951)

Jeannie Gayle Pool
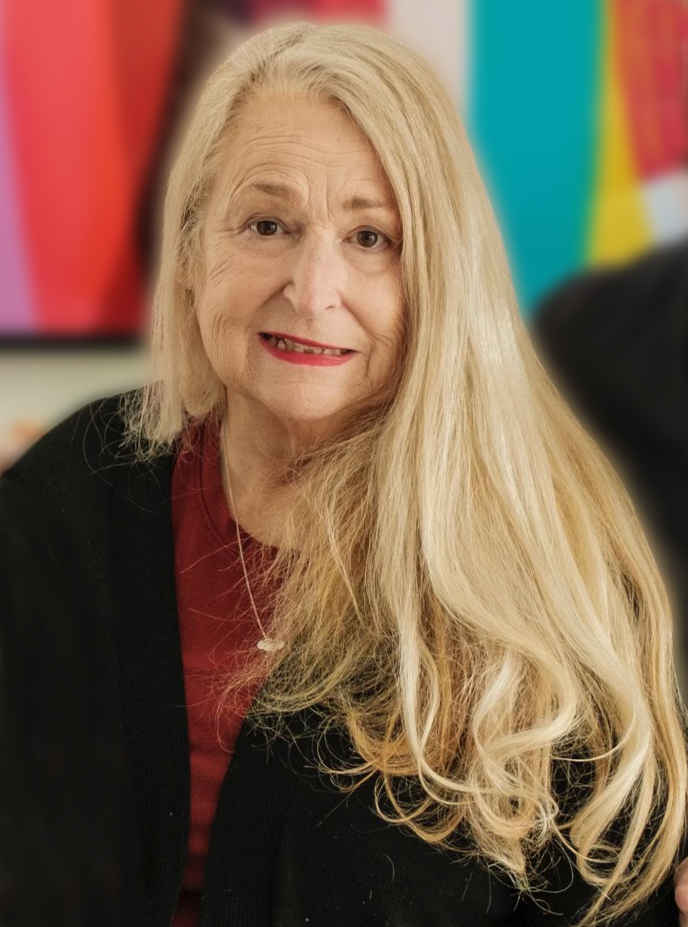
- Pool in 2023
- Born: Jeanne Gayle Pool; November 6, 1951 (age 74); Paris, Illinois, U.S.
- Occupations: Musicologist; Composer; Author; Filmmaker
- Known for: International Congress on Women in Music; Babe Egan and The Hollywood Redheads; Peggy Gilbert and Her All-Girl Band
- Website: jeanniegaylepool.com

Jeannie Gayle Pool (born November 6, 1951) is an American composer, musicologist, filmmaker, producer, and lecturer. An expert on and advocate for women in classical and popular music, she founded the International Congress on Women in Music (now International Alliance for Women in Music), has published books and articles, and has had compositions performed internationally.

== Early life and education ==
Pool was born in Paris, Illinois. She studied music in New York City at Hunter College of the City University of New York, where she earned a Bachelor of Arts degree in music (1977). At Columbia University, she studied musicology (1977–1980). She received a Master's degree from California State University, Northridge (1987), and a PhD from Claremont Graduate University (2002).

== Career ==
After completing her studies, Pool taught music at universities and worked as a radio and music producer. She began composing music for stage productions and youth orchestras, as well as sacred and orchestral works. Her compositions have been performed internationally.

Her restoration and production in 2011 of the original score by John Stepan Zamecnik for the Academy Award-winning film Wings was nominated for the Best Archival Re-recording of an Existing Score by the International Film Music Critics Association (2012).

She is a consultant for film and television music productions on music rights. Through her business Music Legacy Services, she documents and appraises film and TV music archival collections. She was Executive Director of the Society for the Preservation of Film Music (now The Film Music Society) from 1990 to 2002. She was consultant and music archivist for the Paramount Pictures Music Department from 1995 until 2012.

Known as "a champion of twentieth-century American women musicians," she has written books and articles. Before publication of the biography of jazz saxophonist Peggy Gilbert (1905–2007), she produced a documentary on the artist, narrated by Lily Tomlin, which has been screened throughout the United States, reviewed in DownBeat and IAWM Journal.

In addition to authoring the biography of American composer Zenobia Powell Perry (1908–2004), she is the publisher of Perry's music. She also reconstructed and orchestrated Perry's opera Tawawa House about the Underground Railroad; it was performed by Townsend Opera (now Opera Modesto) in 2014, and at the Presidio Chapel in San Francisco in 2019.

An award-winning radio host and producer, Pool was heard weekly on KPFK-fm Pacifica Radio in Los Angeles on her program Music of the Americas, which featured interviews and recordings of contemporary composers and performers (1980–1997). She produces recordings for Cambria Master Recordings, an independent California label that specializes in American music.

Pool is lecturer in Business of Music at Chapman University Hall-Musco Conservatory of Music in Orange, California (2020—). She has also taught as adjunct faculty at several universities, including California State University, Northridge, Fullerton College, and Mount St. Mary's College (now Mount St. Mary's University).

In 1979, she founded the International Congress on Women in Music. She helped to found and serves as advisor to the Board of the International Alliance for Women in Music. In 2004, she was elected to the Board of the American Society of Music Arrangers and Composers. Currently, she is President of the Los Angeles chapter of the National Association of Composers/USA.

== Works ==
=== Compositions ===
Pool has composed for film and stage productions, as well as choir, solo piano, chamber ensemble, and orchestra. Selected works include:

- Secret Life of Paper Cranes, for string orchestra (2001—03)
- Theme and Variations in Seven/Four, for solo piano (2019)
- Cheshire Street Trio, for flute, clarinet, and piano (2018)
- I'm Troubled in Mind, for woodwind quintet (2015)
- Girls in the Band, for wind symphony (2014)
- A Dream, orchestra score for Mary Pickford silent film (2011)
- Cheating Husband Rag, for solo piano (2011)
- Angel's Flight, for flute, clarinet, and orchestra (2009)
- New Beginnings Overture, for orchestra (2007)
- Latin Passions, for solo piano (2005)
- Cinematic Suite, for string orchestra (2005)
- Anomaly Trio, for clarinet, cello, and piano (2003)
- Character Matters, for string quartet (2003)
- Character Matters, for solo piano (2003)
- Fantasia for Anne Boleyn, for solo piano (2002)
- Four Seasons," for clarinet and piano (2001–02)
- Episodia II, for chamber orchestra (2000)
- Cantata: We Believe in You, O God, based on the State of Faith, United Church of Christ, for soloists, choir, chamber orchestra, organ, and bagpipes
- Episodia I, for flute, clarinet, and bassoon (1996)
- With Pleasure, for viola and cello (1996)
- A Woman of Independent Means, for narrator, bassoon, and recorded tape (1983)

=== Books ===
- Pool, Jeannie Gayle (2022). Babe Egan and The Hollywood Redheads: Women Musicians in the Jazz Age. Los Angeles: Jaygayle Music Books. ISBN 979-8432831330. OCLC 1342453733. Reviewed in MLA Notes.
- Perry, Zenobia Powell (2021). Pool, Jeannie Gayle (ed.). Tawawa House: A Musical Drama in Two Acts: Piano-Vocal Score & Libretto. Los Angeles: Jaygayle Music Books. ISBN 9798589869361. OCLC 1257032942.
- Pool, Jeannie Gayle (2020). The Story of the All-Women's Orchestras in California. Los Angeles: Jaygayle Music Books. ISBN 9781075291333. OCLC 1197816000.
- Pool, Jeannie Gayle; Simmons, Beverly, eds. (2019). Source Readings from the International Congress on Women in Music: A Companion Volume to The Passions of Musical Women. Los Angeles: Jaygayle Music Books. ISBN 9781798862896. OCLC 1128756304.
- Pool, Jeannie Gayle; Wright, H. Stephen (2011). A Research Guide to Film and Television Music in the United States. Lanham, MD: Scarecrow Press. ISBN 9780810876880. OCLC 651011993.
- Pool, Jeannie Gayle (2009). American Composer Zenobia Powell Perry: Race and Gender in the 20th Century. Lanham, MD: Scarecrow Press. ISBN 9780810863767. OCLC 239233280. Reviewed in MLA Notes.
- Pool, Jeannie Gayle (2009). Passions of Musical Women : The Story of the International Congress on Women in Music. Los Angeles: Jaygayle Music Books. ISBN 9780557055456. OCLC 317559465., reviewed in Journal of the IAWM.
- Pool, Jeannie Gayle (2008). Peggy Gilbert & Her All-Girl Band. Foreword by Lily Tomlin and Jane Wagner. Lanham, Maryland: Scarecrow Press. ISBN 978-0-8108-6102-2. OCLC 173749535. Reviewed in Popular Music and Society, Music Reference Services Quarterly, and IAWM Journal.
- Pool, Jeannie G. (1986). California Mission Music : A Bibliography. Northridge, CA: California State University, Northridge, Department of Music. OCLC 33893811.
- Pool, Jeannie G. (1986). Handbook, Teaching the History of Women in Music. Northridge, CA: California State University, Northridge, Department of Music. OCLC 15138299.
- Fry, Stephen M.; Pool, Jeannie G. (1985). The Story of the All Women's Orchestras in California, 1893–1955 : Bibliography. Northridge, CA: California State University, Northridge, Department of Music. OCLC 12058193.
- Pool, Jeannie G. (1977). Women in Music History : A Research Guide. Pool. LCCN 79-123489. OCLC 5944033.

=== Radio Programs ===
- A women's music festival on WBAI (airchecks and production)
- Sojourn Shelter for Battered Women
- Women composers: Janice Giteck and Gloria Coates
- Women composers: interview with Ora Williams and Virginia Eskin

== Honors and awards ==
- Best Archival Re-recording of an Existing Score nomination from the International Film Music Critics Association (2012)
- Appreciation Award from the International Alliance for Women in Music (1999)
- Award from the International Alliance for Women in Music for work on behalf of women musicians (1995)
- Award from National Association of Composers/USA for promotion of American composers (1995)
- Service Award from International Congress on Women in Music at the New York City Congress, (1990)
- Award from National Federation of Music Clubs for promotion of American music (1979)
- Service Award from the California Federation of Music Clubs (1989)
- Award from Local 47 of the American Federation of Musicians for documenting the history of women in music (1986)
- Honorary member Phi Kappa Phi Honor Society, California State University, Northridge, Chapter (1986)
- Honorary Arts Member of Sigma Alpha Iota International Music Fraternity (1982)
- Award from USC Thornton School of Music for work on behalf of women in music (1982)
- Radio awards from Sigma Alpha Iota for outstanding broadcasting of American music (1982, 1983, 1986, 1987, 1988)
