= Nellie Y. McKay =

African-American studies scholar (1930–2006)

- Born: Nellie Yvonne Reynolds; May 12, 1930; Queens, New York City, United States
- Died: January 22, 2006 (aged 75); Fitchburg, Wisconsin, United States
- Education: Queens College, City University of New York; Harvard University
- Occupations: Academic and author

Nellie Yvonne McKay (May 12, 1930 – January 22, 2006) was an American academic and author who was the Evjue-Bascom Professor of American and African-American Literature at the University of Wisconsin–Madison, where she also taught in English and women's studies, and is best known as the co-editor (with Henry Louis Gates Jr.) of the Norton Anthology of African-American Literature.

== Biography ==
She was born in Queens, New York City, as Nellie Yvonne Reynolds, to parents who were Jamaican immigrants. She graduated with a B.A. degree in English from Queens College, City University of New York, in 1969, a master's in English and American literature from Harvard University in 1971, and a Ph.D. in the same field from Harvard in 1977.

McKay was assistant professor of English and American Literature at Simmons College and visiting professor of Afro-American Literature at MIT between 1973 and 1978.

McKay joined the faculty of UW–Madison in 1978, receiving tenure in 1984. Her research specialties included 19th- and 20th-century American and African-American literature, black women's literature and multicultural women's writings, all fields that essentially did not exist when she was a student, and whose modern curricula, by many accounts, became heavily indebted to her scholarship. Her colleague at UW–Madison, Craig Werner, said, "When she came here there was not a single university that was paying any attention to black women's literature. Now, there isn't a single university that isn't." A former student recalls that, in 1979, McKay provided the class with photocopied versions of Native Son by Richard Wright and Black Manhattan by James Weldon Johnson, books that were then out of print, from her own rare copies.

According to The Journal of Blacks in Higher Education, in 1991 she was offered the Harvard University post in Afro-American Studies that was later taken by Gates, whom she had recommended in her stead.

By the time she collaborated with Gates on the Norton Anthology of African-American Literature, in 1996, she was already widely known as a pre-eminent scholar in the field of black American literature, and Gates specifically sought her out. The book became a worldwide standard in the field and remains in print in a second edition. It was selected by former Poet Laureate of the United States Rita Dove in 2000 for the National Millennium Time Capsule created by the White House to be stored by the National Archives until the 22nd century, with Dove calling it "a lucid and eloquent history of one of this country's most significant subcultures".

Her edited book Critical Essays on Toni Morrison (1988) is "largely credited with establishing the critical acclaim" that led to Morrison's Nobel Prize in Literature. She played a key role in establishing the UW–Madison Lorraine Hansberry Visiting Professorship in the Dramatic Arts. At the time of her death, McKay had been working on a revised edition of the seminal 1982 black feminist anthology All the Women Are White, All the Blacks are Men, But Some of Us Brave: Black Women's Studies, originally edited by Gloria T. Hull, Patricia Bell-Scott, and Barbara Smith.

She was also advisory editor for the African American Review, president of the Midwest Consortium of Black Studies and a member of the Board of Directors of the Toni Morrison Society.

McKay died on January 22, 2006, of liver cancer or colon cancer at a hospice in Fitchburg, Wisconsin. .

The university held a national symposium in her honor April 1, 2006, including a short film Remembering Nellie McKay by Pete McPartland Jr., and readings by more than 40 fellow academics from across the country.

== Honors ==
- Fellow at the Institute for Research in the Humanities at UW–Madison (1991).
- Fellow at the W. E. B. Du Bois Institute for African and African American Research
- The UW–Madison Chancellor's Distinguished Teaching Award (1992)
- Multi-Ethnic Literature [Association] of the U.S. (MELUS) Annual Award for Contributions to Multi-Ethnic Literature (1996)
- The University of Wisconsin System Recognition for Outstanding Contributions to the System, particularly to Women of Color
- Inducted into Phi Beta Kappa (alpha chapter of WI) 1999
- Inducted into the Wisconsin Academy of Sciences, Arts and Letters (2001)
- Honorary Doctor of Humane Letters, University of Michigan (2002)

== Writings ==
McKay wrote more than 60 articles and essays in books and journals on figures such as Ida B. Wells-Barnett, Zora Neale Hurston and Alice Walker, touching on themes of black literature, American Literature, women's writings and on political issues of interest to the academic community.

=== Books ===
- Jean Toomer, Artist: A Study of His Literary Life and Work, 1894–1936 (University of North Carolina, 1984), ISBN 0-8078-4171-4
- Critical Essays on Toni Morrison (editor, with introduction, G.K. Hall, 1988), ISBN 0-8161-8884-X
- Race-Ing Justice, En-Gendering Power: Essays on Anita Hill, Clarence Thomas, and the Construction of Social Reality (with Toni Morrison and Michael Thelwell, Random House, 1992), ISBN 1-4177-1877-3
- The Sleeper Wakes: Harlem Renaissance Stories by Women (with Marcy Knopf, Rutgers University Press, 1993), ISBN 0-8135-1945-4
- Colored Woman in a White World (African-American Women Writers, 1910-1940) (with Mary Church Terrell, Macmillan Publishers, 1996), ISBN 0-7838-1421-6
- Norton Anthology of African-American Literature (General co-editor with Henry Louis Gates Jr.; W.W. Norton, 1996; second edition, 2005), ISBN 0-393-97778-1
- Approaches to Teaching the Novels of Toni Morrison (ed. with Kathryn Earle, MLA Publications, 1997), ISBN 0-87352-741-0
- Toni Morrison's Beloved: A Casebook (ed. with William L. Andrews, Oxford University Press, 1999), ISBN 0-19-510796-9
- Incidents in the Life of a Slave Girl, a slave narrative by Harriet Jacobs (Norton Critical Edition co-edited with Frances Smith Foster), 2001), ISBN 0-393-97637-8

== Quotations ==
- On the Norton Anthology: "Never again will anybody anywhere not be able to know about the existence of the African-American literature tradition. This is a bible, as far as I'm concerned."
- "There is nothing mystical about African American literature that makes it the sole property of people of African descent."
