= All the Women Are White, All the Blacks Are Men, But Some of Us Are Brave =

1982 anthology published by Feminist Press

- First edition
- Editors: Akasha Gloria Hull; Patricia Bell-Scott; Barbara Smith
- Set in: Old Westbury, New York
- Publisher: Feminist Press
- Publication date: 1982; 44 years ago
- Publication place: United States
- Pages: 401
- Awards: National Institute's Women of Color Award
- ISBN: 0912670959
- OCLC: 8165060

All the Women Are White, All the Blacks Are Men, But Some of Us Are Brave (1982) is a landmark feminist anthology in Black women's studies printed in numerous editions, co-edited by Akasha Gloria Hull, Patricia Bell-Scott, and Barbara Smith. Featuring contributions from Alice Walker, Michele Wallace, the Combahee River Collective, Beverly Smith, Lorraine Bethel, and others. Widely regarded as the first comprehensive collection of Black feminist scholarship, it is considered a foundational text in the establishment of Black women’s studies as an academic discipline. The anthology, alongside This Bridge Called My Back (1981), is frequently cited as a direct influence on Kimberlé Crenshaw’s development of intersectionality theory in her 1989 essay “Demarginalizing the Intersection of Race and Sex.”

== Awards ==
Hull received the National Institute's Women of Color Award for her contribution to this book. Her contribution to this "landmark scholarship directed attention to the lives of Black women and, combined with the numerous articles she wrote thereafter, helped remedy the emphasis within Feminist Studies on white women and within Black studies on Black men".

== Context ==
The anthology is organized around sections addressing Black feminist politics, literary criticism, pedagogy, and bibliography. It opens with Alice Walker’s poem “Women,” a foreword by Mary Berry and an introductory essay by Hull and Smith, “The Politics of Black Women's Studies.” Contributions include Michele Wallace’s “A Black Feminist’s Search for Sisterhood”; a reprinting of “A Black Feminist Statement” by the Combahee River Collective. A Boston-based group whose name refers to Harriet Tubman’s 1863 raid along South Carolina’s Combahee River, which freed more than 750 enslaved people. As well as Patricia Bell-Scott’s “Selected Bibliography on Black Feminism”; an excerpt from Alice Walker’s “One Child of One’s Own”; Ellen Pence’s “Racism - A White Issue”; and Barbara Smith’s “Racism and Women's Studies.”

Later sections turn to literary and historical scholarship, including Erlene Stetson’s essay on the Black female slave, Lorraine Bethel’s “The Infinity of Conscious Pain: Zora Neale Hurston and the Black Female Literary Tradition,” Rita B. Dandridge’s bibliographical essay on novels by Black American women and Jeanne-Marie A. Miller’s survey of Black women playwrights from Grimké to Shange. Pedagogical and health-focused contributions include Bell-Scott’s “Debunking Sapphire” and Beverly Smith’s “Black Women's Health: Notes for a Course.”

The volume closes with Barbara Smith’s “Toward a Black Feminist Criticism,” originally published independently in 1977 and widely regarded as a foundational essay in Black feminist literary criticism in its own right.

The interest in black feminism was on the rise in the 1970s, through the writings of Mary Helen Washington, Audre Lorde, Alice Walker, and others.

In 1981, the anthology This Bridge Called My Back, edited by Cherríe Moraga and Gloria E. Anzaldúa, was published and But Some of Us Are Brave was published the following year. In both anthologies, the emphasis was placed on the intersection between race and gender. The contributors argued that previous waves of feminism had focused on issues related to white women. They wanted to negotiate a larger space for Black women. According to Teresa de Lauretis, This Bridge Called My Back and But Some of Us Are Brave revealed "the feelings, the analyses, and the political positions of Black feminists, and their critiques of white or mainstream feminism" and created a "shift in feminist consciousness."

== Impact ==
In the 2000 reprint of their anthology, editors Hull, Bell-Scott, and Smith described how in 1992 Black feminists mobilized "a remarkable national response" - African American Women in Defense of Ourselves - to the controversy surrounding the nomination of Clarence Thomas to the Supreme Court of the United States against the backdrop of allegations by law professor Anita Hill, about sexual harassment that became part of Thomas' confirmation hearings.

Legal scholar Kimberlé Crenshaw cited But Some of Us Are Brave at the beginning of her seminal 1989 paper, "Demarginalizing the Intersection of Race and Sex: A Black Feminist Critique of Antidiscrimination Doctrine, Feminist Theory and Antiracist Politics", in which she introduced the concept of Intersectionality. Crenshaw is known for introducing and developing intersectional theory to feminism. Crenshaw noted that it was one of the "very few Black women's studies books". She used the title All the Women Are White, All the Blacks Are Men, But Some of Us are Brave, as her "point of departure" to "develop a Black feminist criticism".

Barbara Y. Welke published her article entitled "When All the Women Were White, and All the Blacks Were Men: Gender, Class, Race, and the Road to Plessy, 1855–1914", in reference to Hull et al., in 1995 in the Law and History Review. Welke wrote how Crenshaw, referring to But Some of Us Are Brave, said that the title "sets forth a problematic consequence of the tendency to treat race and gender as mutually exclusive categories of experience and analysis.

== Related readings ==
- This Bridge Called My Back: Writings by Radical Women of Color (1981), edited by Cherríe Moraga and Gloria E. Anzaldúa

== Contributors (writers) ==
- Mary Frances Berry
- Lorraine Bethel
- Martha H. Brown
- Constance M. Carroll
- Combahee River Collective
- Tia Cross
- Rita B. Dandridge
- Jacquelyn Grant's paper "Black women and the church" was published in the anthology.
- Elizabeth Higginbotham
- Freada Klein
- Jeanne-Marie A. Miller
- Ramona Matthewson
- Ellen Pence
- Michele Russell
- Joan R. Sherman
- Barbara Smith
- Beverly Smith
- Erlene Stetson
- Alice Walker
- Michele Wallace was one of the founding members of the National Black Feminist Organization (NBFO) established in 1973, to respond to the unique issues faced by African-American women. Her 1975 article "A Black Feminist's Search For Sisterhood" (1975) was included in But Some of Us Are Brave.
- Mary Helen Washington
- Ora Williams
- Thelma Williams
- Dora Wilson
- Jean Fagan Yellin

== See also ==
- Chicana feminism
- Black feminism
- Womanism
- Third-world feminism
- Home Girls: A Black Feminist Anthology
- Daughters of Africa
