= Peggy Gilbert =

American jazz musician and bandleader (1905–2007)

Background information
- Born: Margaret Fern Knechtges; January 17, 1905; Sioux City, Iowa, U.S.
- Origin: Hollywood, California
- Died: February 12, 2007 (aged 102) Burbank, California
- Genres: Jazz
- Occupations: Musician, bandleader
- Instruments: Saxophone, clarinet, piano, vibes

Peggy Gilbert (January 17, 1905 – February 12, 2007), born Margaret Fern Knechtges, was an American jazz saxophonist and bandleader.

She was born in Sioux City, Iowa. When she was seven years old, she played piano and violin with her father's band; she later discovered jazz and started to play the saxophone. After high school, she performed in local theatres and resorts and became a performer on radio and television.

In 1928, she moved to Hollywood, where she appeared in movies and toured with Fanchon and Marco vaudeville shows. In 1933 she founded her all-female jazz band, whose name often changed from "Peggy Gilbert and Her Metro Goldwyn Orchestra" to "Peggy Gilbert and her Symphonics". She performed on saxophone, vibes, piano, and vocals. In the 1930s and 1940s, Gilbert and her band performed in the most famous nightclubs in Hollywood, including the Cocoanut Grove. At one of these clubs, she met and fell in love with Kay Boley, a vaudevillian and contortionist.

During this period, she appeared in films, toured Alaska with a USO troupe, and began to be an advocate for women musicians. After a difficult period following the Second World War, Gilbert had success on radio and television programs in the 1950s. In 1974, at 69 years old, she created her last great all-female band, The Dixie Belles, with musicians from vaudeville and the Big Band era. The group performed on TV and at jazz festivals, appearing on The Tonight Show Starring Johnny Carson, The Golden Girls, and in the 1980 Rose Parade. In 1985, the band recorded the album Peggy Gilbert & the Dixie Belles. Gilbert lived until the age of 102 and died in Burbank, California.

== Life and career ==
=== Early years ===
Peggy Gilbert was born Margaret Fern Knechtges Gilbert on January 17, 1905, in Sioux City, Iowa. Her father, John Darwin Knechtges, played in theater pit bands in Sioux City as a violinist, and her mother, Edith Ella Gilbert, sang for the opera house in Sioux City. Gilbert "was raised to respect all types of music and to love all kinds of music". She began to take piano lessons at age eight, and frequently accompanied her father to stage shows, playing piano in her first performance with his band.

Gilbert lived in a nurturing home environment. She and her brother Oral Lloyd Knechtges, who was born in 1900, were always encouraged to listen to music, and they lived a very comfortable life. In addition, her parents did not tolerate prejudice, and they "learned right from the beginning to treat everyone with respect and consideration, regardless of race or ethnicity." Gilbert admired her father and his musical ability and took much of her inspiration from him.

At age seven, Gilbert landed her first professional job as a dancer for the touring group of the Scottish cultural ambassador Sir Henry Lauder. She and six other young girls toured Nebraska, South Dakota, North Dakota, and Iowa, performing the Highland Fling dance.

From a young age, Gilbert was aware of the injustice that came along with gender preference, and she learned that she would have to work hard in order to achieve what she wanted. For example, although her brother Orval encouraged her in her studies, she realized that people treated him differently; she was very aware of the fact that she was "just a girl."

Gilbert attended Sioux City High School where she took secretarial courses, as well as weekly piano lessons. When she graduated in 1923, she attended Morningside College for six months before leaving and going into the music business. Part of this decision was based on the fact that in the 1920s, her father became ill, so Gilbert was needed to help support her parents. At this time, she self-taught herself the alto saxophone, as she was told it was not suitable for young women, and joined the Musicians Union in Sioux City.

=== The Melody Girls ===
Gilbert organized her first band in Sioux City, a group that was composed of Gilbert on the saxophone and clarinet, Marjorie Kelley on piano, Dorothy Kelley on banjo and accordion, Orval Knechtges on drums, Ruth Dubnoff on violin, and two other men on trumpet and bass. The Melody Girls, also formed in Sioux City, was made up of five or six pieces and was formed with some of the musicians from her first band. The band played all around the city, in all of the clubs, the Chamber of Commerce, and the Martin Hotel, where they played for two years and were broadcast every night on the local radio station KSCJ.

When Gilbert's father died in November 1927, she decided she needed to start a career in the entertainment business in order to support her mother and grandmother. In 1928, the family moved to Los Angeles but had to return to Sioux City to help a suddenly widowed Orval. The family, now including Orval and his children, all moved to Los Angeles with Gilbert. The move to Los Angeles, and the promise of fame, prompted Gilbert to adopt her mother's maiden name because "Knechtges" (kuh-NET-chiz) was too difficult to pronounce. At this time, there wasn't too much competition in Los Angeles because women jazz musicians were still finding their place in the business. Gilbert's first job in the city was with the vaudeville performers Irene Franklin and Juanita Connors.

=== Fanchon and Marco ===
In 1928, Gilbert auditioned for the vaudeville producers Fanchon "Fanny" Wolff Simon and Marco "Mike" Wolff, first touring with Rudy Wiedoeft and a sextet of saxophone players in a show titled "Saxophobia Idea." The show opened in October 1928 in Los Angeles, and toured San Diego, Hollywood, San Francisco, Salem, Seattle, Denver, Buffalo, Hartford, Philadelphia, Washington, D.C., Atlanta, and many other cities. The tour was very well received and widely covered by the press.

After the "Saxophobia" tour, Gilbert returned to Hollywood. She spent the spring and summer of 1929 as a saxophone player for an all-female group performing at El Mirador Hotel in Palm Springs.

In October 1929, Gilbert performed in another Fanchon and Marco tour, the "Jazz Temple Idea." This yearlong tour helped Gilbert provide for her mother through the stock market crash of 1929. The show, which followed the same itinerary as the "Saxophobia" tour, was considered "a novelty." The next Fanchon and Marco tour in which Gilbert performed was the "Busy Bee Idea," a tour that traveled through the United States and Canada in 1930 and 1931. After this tour, Gilbert returned to Los Angeles, where she was doing studio work for MGM.

=== Early 1930s ===
By the end of the "Busy Bee" tour, the Great Depression was in full swing, and it was much more difficult to earn a living in show business. Gilbert started promoting herself as a bandleader, using connections to appear in several movies with her all-female band. They appeared as sideliners and usually did not receive screen credit, so it's hard to know exactly how many films they appeared in at MGM. However, Gilbert began promoting the band as Peggy Gilbert and the Metro-Goldwyn-Mayer Girls. Known film appearances include Politics (1931), Wet Parade (1932), and That's My Boy (1932).

In 1932, Gilbert traveled throughout California, taking up various jobs with various bands. During this time, Gilbert made sure her bands were heard on the radio because she knew it would build them an audience. They were broadcast both live from nightclubs and ballrooms and from the radio stations.

In 1933, Gilbert joined Boots and Her Buddies. She traveled with them for about three months, then returned to Los Angeles, where the rest of the women from the band joined her a few months later. With their arrival in May 1933, Gilbert saw the opportunity to form her own big band. The band played in Las Vegas and at all of the major theater chains in the area: Warner Bros. Theaters, Pantages Theaters, and West Coast Theaters. In October 1933, Gilbert took her band to Hawaii with E.K. Fernandez, the man who began the entertainment business in Hawaii in 1903.

After the band returned from Hawaii in 1934, there were plenty of jobs available for musicians in Los Angeles. Gilbert always had a gig lined up for the band, and they played in popular nightclubs all over L.A., including the Cocoanut Grove at the Ambassador Hotel, the Hollywood Roosevelt Hotel, and the Club New Yorker.

=== Late 1930s ===
The Hollywood music scene continued to flourish in 1935, despite the Great Depression. Gilbert and her band played in clubs and ballrooms all over Hollywood, San Diego, and Southern California. They also took over the radio, as they were broadcast over KFWB, KFOX, and KFXM. They played on KFOX regularly, according to radio listings, and performed regularly at the Italian Village in Los Angeles during the cocktail hour primetime. These radio performances and club gigs led to Gilbert's continued popularity in the mid-1930s.

In March 1936, the band performed at the 41 Club's 35th anniversary celebration, the Annual Dinner Dance of the California Yacht Club, and the Albert Sheetz Circus Café. The band at this point consisted of Kathleen McArtor on drums, Bunny Hart on guitar, Mable Hicks on trumpet, Caryl Agnew on piano, and Gilbert on saxophone. These performances were "rated tops as exponents of modern harmony and swing rhythm."

In 1937, the band played at the Zenda Dance Café in Los Angeles five nights a week and appeared in the Second Hollywood Swing Concert at The Palomar. They were considered "one of the finest bands of its type in the country." In January 1938, Gilbert and her band returned to the Zenda Ballroom, where their two-week contract ended up extending to two years.

The band continued to play in films during this time. They appeared in Melody for Two (1937), The Great Waltz (1938), Rhythm of the Saddle (1938) and Reckless Living (1938).

In 1939, Gilbert and her band continued to be featured in many clubs and events, including the New Hollywood Café and the 15th Annual Policemen's Ball in Phoenix, Arizona. In 1939 and 1940, the band was broadcast on KMPC as "The Early Girls and Three Chirps." The group did the regular morning and afternoon programs, as well as additional programs that were requested by commercial sponsors. They still played late nights at clubs and worked sidelined in films. Gilbert then returned home in order to live a "normal life," but, quickly realizing that she couldn't stay in Sioux City, returned to Los Angeles.

=== Gilbert's article in Down Beat ===
In 1938, Gilbert wrote an article for Down Beat magazine in response to an anonymous article titled "Why Women Musicians Are Inferior." The article criticized men who discourage women musicians. She said that women musicians faced a double standard: they had to look beautiful while playing their instruments. It was nearly impossible for an all-female band to survive "on musicianship rather than looks." While men were hired for musical talent, women were, for the most part, hired strictly for looks. Gilbert experienced this discrimination throughout her career, as "she encountered incredulity, outright rejection and auditions at which band members were asked to lift their skirts to prove they had good legs." Gilbert asked, "How can you smile with a horn in your mouth?" She received support from other women musicians all over the country. The article gave her national prominence as an advocate for women instrumentalists and throughout the rest of her life, she continued to be a strong "one-woman support network and staunch advocate for women."

=== Early 1940s and World War II ===
By the late 1930s, there was very high demand for all-female bands. This rise of women's bands that correlated with the United States' involvement in World War II did not mean that women musicians were solely filling the men's shoes for a few years. Although "All-woman bands had been abundant in the '20s and '30s, yet musicians who played in the groups of the '40s were regarded as temporary war-time phenomena: Rosie the Riveter with a trumpet." Despite the growing competition, Gilbert refused to make her shows risqué, and she avoided being a "glamour girl" bandleader. Instead, she focused on the music and on how the band sounded, gaining respect from all who played with her.

In 1941, Gilbert began to work for Local 47 where she helped the union operate the Hollywood Canteen as a place to entertain troops, host blood drives, sell war bonds, help place male musicians into military bands, and more. Gilbert's band also began playing as The Victory Belles on a radio show geared toward servicemen.

In June 1942, Peggy and her steady boyfriend of seven years, James Wright, decided to get married before he was sent to Europe. Although he was gone, Gilbert was kept busy, saying that during World War II, her band was working all the time in all different job settings.

In 1944, Gilbert did a six-month tour of Alaska with the United Service Organization (USO) with Thelma White, an actress and comedian. The group performed for men in hospitals and camps at various airbases where the band still experienced some gender-based discrimination. One night, high-ranking officers cancelled a hospital ship show so that the women in the band could "mingle at a party instead." The band, however, was able to leave the party and make it in time to perform, which was what they had come to do.

In October 1944, before she left for Alaska, Gilbert met Kay Boley, and the two instantly became close, lifelong friends. When Gilbert and her husband got a divorce, she and Kay moved in together and continued out their lives as loving partners and supportive friends. During that time, there was "no presumption or discussion of a lesbian lifestyle," and Gilbert and Kay's lifestyle was accepted by their friends and family.

When the war ended, Gilbert was back in Los Angeles trying to find jobs for her big band. Many women musicians, including Gilbert, lost their jobs after World War II because the women "had to move over and let [the men] take over where they left off."

While Gilbert continued to play whenever she could, she began to work full-time for Local 47, doing clerical work. She was forced to organize a band of men and women after the war because there was a lack of female musicians. This band, called The Jacks and Jills, included Gilbert's brother Orval on drums and continued to perform until the 1950s.

In the late 1940s, jazz began to develop into bebop, and Gilbert's bands became steadily old-fashioned. By 1949, Gilbert was in high demand as a secretary and served on many committees at Local 47. With this section of her life coming to a close, it was clear that "her skill as a saxophonist and bandleader, combined with business acumen, flexibility, and good humor, allowed her to make a living and support her family throughout the depression and war years."

=== 1950s and 1960s ===
In 1951, Gilbert received permission from Local 47 to perform with Ada Leonard on KTTV television for a year. In 1953, she left her job at Local 47 for a job as secretary to the president of a barbecue manufacturing company, but she did not stay long at her new job, returning to Local 47 and working there until 1970.

The late 1950s brought the rise of free jazz, and many of the women in Gilbert's generation were no longer performing. Gilbert, however, continued to play when she was asked, but she realized that she was too old to be performing live on a regular basis. She had to ask for approval from Local 47 to perform outside her office job. Gilbert continued to appear in films with her all-female groups, including The Second Time Around (1961).

As jobs for musicians began to decline in the early sixties, Gilbert focused on helping younger musicians through Local 47. She was in charge of orientation sessions for new members, as well as served on the Trial Board and Board of Directors for many years. She was discouraged from performing while working there, but was seen on occasional TV shows and motion pictures.

In July 1967, Gilbert was honored at a reunion of sixty women from the "Girls Big Band Era." The event was "a surprise tribute to one of the most loved and respected leaders of 'show biz'—Peggy Gilbert."

=== The Dixie Belles ===
Gilbert retired from Local 47 in January 1970, on her sixty-fifth birthday, but she continued to serve on the Trial Board of Local 47 until 1984, and in 1985, she was elected to be a Trustee of the Union.

Gilbert founded a senior citizen Dixieland jazz group, The Dixie Belles, in the early 1970s, and they immediately had great success and began to perform regularly. In 1975, Gilbert put a group together to appear in the film Long Last Love, and she continued to promote the band for film and TV appearances.

Gilbert also continued to speak out for women musicians. Beginning in 1979, she wrote a regular column called "Tuning in on Femme Musicians" for The Overture in which she promoted professional women musicians. At this time, Gilbert was also a senior member of Local 47, and she continued to mentor younger generations of musicians.

The Dixie Belles continued to perform throughout Southern California, playing at many festivals, fairs, parades, and other events in California. In July 1981, Gilbert received a "Live Music Award" in recognition of her service to Local 47. The Dixie Belles also appeared on several television shows: The Tonight Show Starring Johnny Carson (1981), Madame's Place (1982), The Golden Girls (1988), America's Funniest Home Videos (1991), and You Bet Your Life (1993). The band continued playing for various benefits and festivals during the 1980s.

In 1986, the Dixie Belles recorded their only album for the Cambria Master Recording label. The band at this time consisted of Gilbert on saxophone, Natalie Robin on clarinet, Marnie Wells on trumpet, Jerrie Thill on drums, Georgia Shilling on piano, and Pearl Powers on bass.

In March 1986, Jeannie Pool produced a luncheon and concert in order to make a "Tribute to the Pioneer Women Musicians of Los Angeles." The program honored 106 women musicians that performed in the 1920s, '30s, and '40s, and Peggy Gilbert and The Dixie Belles made appearances.

By 1989, the Dixie Belles were playing an average of 150 jobs per year. They band continued to appear on television throughout the early- to mid-1990s, including shows such as ABC-TV World News Saturday and Ellen.

The death of Dixie Belle clarinetist Natalie Robin in March 1998 marked the end of the band. Some of the members of the band continued to perform, but they had ceased to play as a group, after nearly twenty-four years together.

=== Final years and death ===
In 1990 the Dixie Belles received the Commitment to Feminism Award from the City of Los Angeles Street Fair. In 2005, Gilbert celebrated her 100th birthday at Local 47 in an auditorium that she helped to build in 1949. After her hundredth birthday, Gilbert became increasingly frail, especially with her partner, Kay, in the hospital. Gilbert died on February 12, 2007, at the age of 102, after suffering complications from hip surgery. Her ashes were buried a few weeks later in the Hollywood Hills, and Kay, who died only a few months later, is buried next to her. Despite the hardships she faced as a female musician, Gilbert said that she always stayed true to her values and lived by the mantra that "making a living doing something that you love is important. I was making a living in a business that I loved."

== Legacy ==
Gilbert's archives are held in the University Library at California State University, Northridge.
