= Some of My Best Friends Are Men =

- Genre: Women's issues
- Presented by: Maxine Samuels
- Country of origin: Canada
- Original language: English
- No. of seasons: 1

Production
- Producer: Margo Lane
- Running time: 30 minutes

Original release
- Network: CBC Television
- Release: 11 September – 13 November 1975

Some of My Best Friends are Men is a Canadian women's issues television program that aired on CBC Television in 1975.

== Premise ==
The program took a humorous approach to feminist topics during International Women's Year. One recurring segment featured Dave Broadfoot, who portrayed a male chauvinist and was pied for his behaviour. Florynce Kennedy also hosted a regular opinion segment. A "Shiny Golden Porker" award was announced to identify cases of media sexism. Subjects included men who look after their children following separation, and the legality of prostitution. The host was television producer Maxine Samuels (The Forest Rangers).

== Scheduling ==
This half-hour program was broadcast Thursdays at 10:30 p.m. (Eastern time) from 11 September to 13 November 1975.

== See also ==
- Ms! (CBC Television, 1973)
