= Tangent (disambiguation) =

A tangent, in geometry, is a straight line through a point on a curve that has the same direction at that point as the curve.

Tangent may also refer to:

== Mathematics ==
- Analogous concepts for surfaces and higher-dimensional smooth manifolds, such as the tangent space
  - More generally, in geometry, two curves are said to be tangent when they intersect at a given point and have the same direction at that point; see for instance tangent circles
  - Bitangent, a line that is tangent to two different curves, or tangent twice to the same curve
- The tangent function, one of the six basic trigonometric functions

== Music ==
- Tangent (clavichord), a part of the action of the clavichord that both initiates and sustains a tone, and helps determine pitch
- Tangent (tangent piano), a part of the action of the tangent piano that only initiates the sound by striking the string(s) and rebounding immediately in the manner of a piano
- The Tangent, an international progressive rock supergroup
- Tangents: The Tea Party Collection, a compilation album from The Tea Party released in 2000.
- Tangents: 1973–1983, a compilation box set from Tangerine Dream released in 1994.
- Tangents (band), an Australian musical group

== Entertainment ==
- Tangent Comics, a short-lived imprint of DC Comics
- "The Tangent Universe", the alternate universe in time travel in the cult film Donnie Darko
- Tangent (Stargate SG-1), an episode of the television series Stargate SG-1
- Tangents (film) or Time Chasers, a 1994 science fiction film
- Tangents (collection), a collection of science fiction stories by Greg Bear

== Geography ==
- Tangent, Alberta, a hamlet in Alberta, Canada
- Tangent, Oregon, a city in Linn County, Oregon, United States
- The Tangent Line, part of the Mason–Dixon line between Delaware and Maryland, United States
- Tangente River, a tributary of the Wawagosic River, in Quebec, Canada

== Other uses ==
- Tangent (club), an international social networking group for women over 45
- Track transition curve, a straight section of road or track in highway and railroad design
