= Uptown, Memphis =

Neighborhood in Memphis, Tennessee

Coordinates: 35.1653°N 90.0425°W

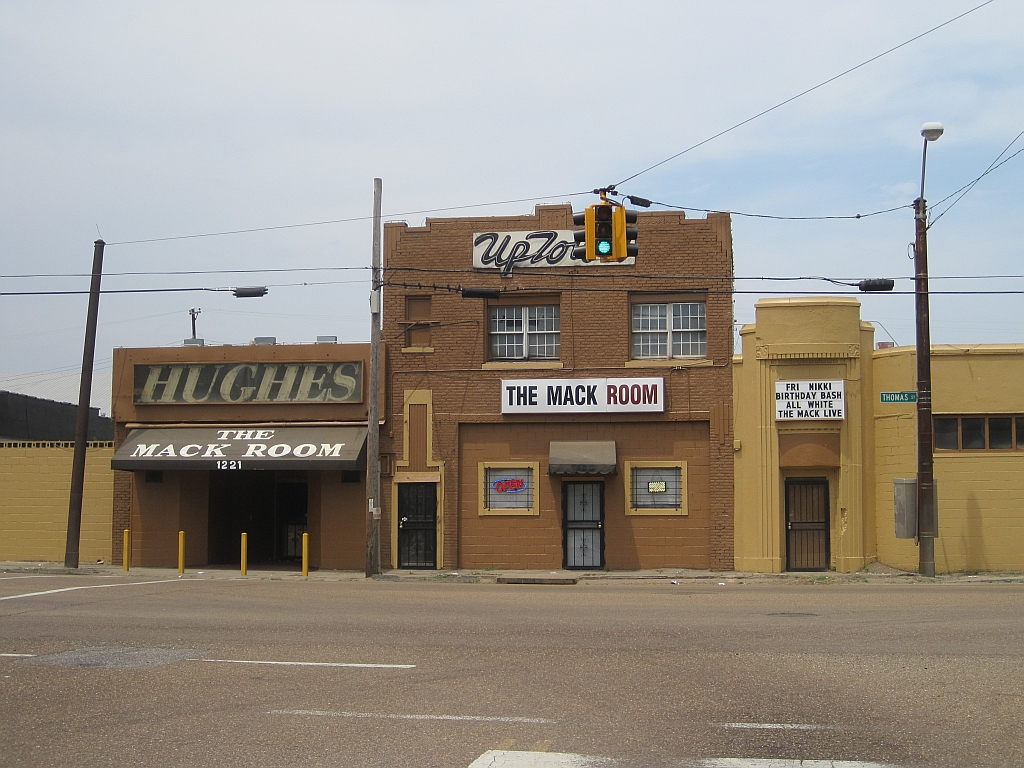
An Uptown Memphis streetscape

Uptown Memphis is a neighborhood located near downtown Memphis, Tennessee. In 1999, the Uptown Partnership renamed the historic North Memphis Greenlaw neighborhood "Uptown" in concert with a public-private revitalization effort that defined Uptown as one hundred city blocks east of the Wolf River and north of A. W. Willis Avenue. The historic Greenlaw section of this neighborhood consists of the thirty city blocks closest to the Wolf River (bordered by A. W. Willis Avenue to the south, North Seventh Street to the east, Keel Avenue and Chelsea Avenue to the north and the Wolf River to the west).

Areas adjacent to Uptown include St. Jude Children's Research Hospital and the Pinch District.

== History ==
=== 19th century ===
In 1856, Greenlaw Addition was laid out by William B. Greenlaw, John O. Greenlaw, Robert F. Looney, John L. Saffarans, Isaac Saffarans and E. T. Keel. They owned the land north of Memphis across Bayou Gayoso from downtown. The Bayou was the original northern boundary of the City of Memphis.

The thirty block subdivision extended the grid patterns of downtown Memphis and included many desirable features such as cobbled streets, granite curbs, and boulevards lined with sycamore trees. The names of the founders are familiar as the east-west streets honor them: Greenlaw, Saffarans, Looney, and Keel. Mill Street was named due for the mills that occupied the adjacent riverfront.

The namesakes of this new addition, the Greenlaw Brothers, arrived in Memphis during the city's early days. They built open-air markets in the downtown. The other partners in the project were prominent Memphis businessmen in the 1850s: Robert Looney operated a dry goods store, John Saffarans owned a building supply company and sawmill and E. T. Keel owned grocery stores and property. Many of the original Greenlaw residents were also prominent Memphis businessmen and citizens while many other residents were construction tradesmen.

By the Civil War the area was prospering as remaining lots were developed and sawmills, brickyards and breweries were built on the river's banks. In 1870, Greenlaw and Chelsea were annexed into Memphis.

Once Memphis recovered from the devastating effects of the Civil War, Greenlaw witnessed a major commercial and residential development. Neighborhood businesses concentrated along North Second Street as the area west of North Main became more industrial. Residences included a mix of larger homes on prominent corner locations, smaller duplexes on the inside blocks and shotgun style homes on the alleyways and near the bayou. Originally named High Street, Seventh Street was the prime location for expensive homes due to its topographical advantage. Seventh Street follows the line of a Native American trail running north and until 1867 fed the only bridge crossing Bayou Gayoso. George Love, a former Mayor of Memphis, built a grand home on North Seventh Street in 1888, which became the city's Non-Profit Housing Center. Love also built investment properties, including four "Love cottages" on North Sixth Street in 1890 that were renovated by Memphis Heritage, a preservation nonprofit.

In its prosperous years, Greenlaw was inhabited by an ethnically and economically diverse population. First-generation Irish, German, Jewish and Italian immigrants and second-generation Americans from the North and Midwest settled there. By 1890, Greenlaw had a large African American population including owners of neighborhood businesses and professionals.

=== 20th century ===
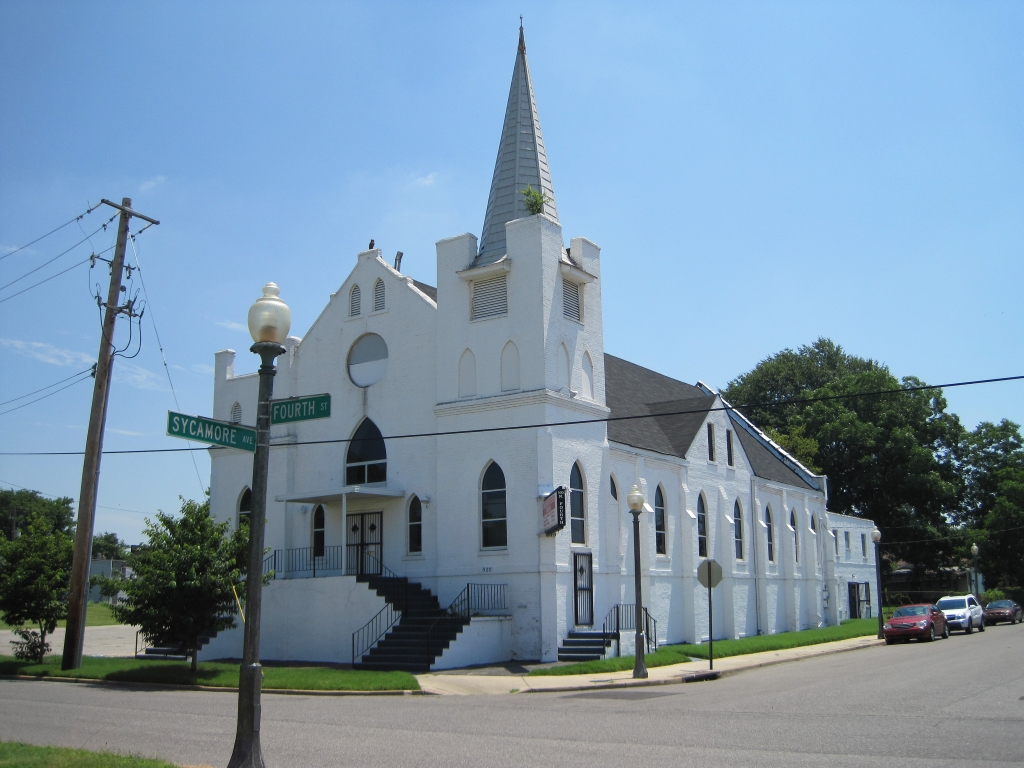
The First Baptist Church Chelsea

The 1912 Mississippi River Flood had a major impact on Greenlaw. It was at the epicenter of the flooding, suffering four feet deep floodwaters at North Second Street and Mill Street. 1,200 people fled as floods damaged over 714 homes and 25 manufacturing plants.

Gayoso Pumping station was built by the city in 1912 to prevent a recurrence, but in 1913 the levee collapsed displacing over 1,000 families and covering twenty city block with water. The Flood Control Act of 1917 proposed more additional levee construction but changes were not enacted until the 1930s as New Deal construction projects to include permanent concrete box culverts, chamber, and pump stations.

By the 1920s, prominent and politically powerful families such as the Walshes, Loves and Guthries had moved out of the neighborhood. This population shift reduced the city's support for the neighborhood; the Wolf River Bridge at the north end of Second Street was washed out in the 1930s and was never replaced. With the rapidly departing wealthy population, Greenlaw lost its political clout and its sense as a "special" neighborhood. Large homes were sold and often redesigned as apartments, rooming houses or businesses. Newly constructed homes were modest, designed to attract blue collar workers who found the neighborhood convenient and affordable.

With favorable geography and low property values, Greenlaw was a major location of industrial growth during World War II. By 1945, Philip Belz had built plants in North Memphis for General Motors, Bemis Bag, General Electric, Kroger, U.S. Rubber, and National Biscuit. The neighborhood attracted blue-collar workers and African Americans. Bars, liquor stores and juke joints opened, tarnishing the family-friendly atmosphere.

In an effort to attract more white residents, the Memphis Housing Authority built an all-white housing development called Hurt Village in the 1950s.

Racial tensions were at a high in the 1960s due to a sanitation strike and assassination of Martin Luther King. Most whites who lived in Hurt Village moved out. Non-profit groups sought to assist the mainly African-American residents left.

=== 21st century ===
In 2000, Memphis was awarded the Hope VI grant for demolition of Hurt Village. Uptown is evolving into a mixed community that is rich in culture and people. The Blind Side took place there.

== Notable residents ==
At one time, Elvis Presley lived in Lauderdale Courts, a housing project in this area which was renovated into an apartment complex. Eric Boyce and family once lived there. Football player and subject of the book The Blind Side, Michael Oher spent most of his childhood growing up in Uptown Memphis.
