= Florynce Kennedy =

American lawyer, feminist, and activist (1916–2000)

- Kennedy c.1976
- Born: Florynce Rae Kennedy; February 11, 1916; Kansas City, Missouri, U.S.
- Died: December 21, 2000 (aged 84); New York City, New York, U.S.
- Other name: Flo Kennedy
- Education: Columbia University (BA, LLB)
- Occupations: Lawyer; feminist; activist

Florynce Rae Kennedy (February 11, 1916 – December 21, 2000) was an American lawyer, feminist, civil rights advocate, lecturer, and activist.

== Early life ==
Kennedy was born in Kansas City, Missouri, to Wiley Kennedy and Zella Rae Jackman Kennedy, an African-American family. Her father Wiley Kennedy was a Pullman porter, and later had a taxi business. The second of her parents' five daughters, she had a happy childhood, full of support from her parents, despite experiencing poverty in the Great Depression and racism in her mostly white neighborhood. Kennedy remembered a time when her father had to be armed with a shotgun in order to ward off the strong neighborhood Ku Klux Klan presence that was trying to drive her family out. She later commented: "My parents gave us a fantastic sense of security and worth. By the time the bigots got around to telling us that we were nobody, we already knew we were somebody."

Kennedy graduated at the top of her class at Lincoln High School, after which she worked many jobs including owning a hat shop and operating elevators. After the death of her mother Zella in 1942, Kennedy left Missouri for New York City, moving to an apartment in Harlem with her sister Grayce. Of the move to New York she commented, "I really didn't come here to go to school, but the schools were here, so I went." In 1944 she began classes at Columbia University School of General Studies, majoring in pre-law and graduated in 1949. However, when she applied to the university's law school, she was refused admission. In her autobiography Kennedy wrote,

The Associate Dean, Willis Reese, told me I had been rejected not because I was a Black but because I was a woman. So I wrote him a letter saying that whatever the reason was, it felt the same to me, and some of my more cynical friends thought I had been discriminated against because I was Black.

Kennedy met with the dean and threatened to sue the school. They admitted her. She was the only black person among eight women in her class. In a 1946 sociology class at Columbia University Kennedy wrote a paper that analogized the discourses of race and sex. "Kennedy hoped that comparing 'women' and 'Negroes' would hasten the formation of alliances".

Kennedy aimed to make white people nervous by wearing her typical cowboy hat and pink sunglasses.

== Career and acting ==
Kennedy graduated from Columbia Law School in 1951.

By 1954, she had opened her own office, doing matrimonial work, and some assigned criminal cases. She was a member of the Young Democrats. In 1956, she formed a legal partnership with the lawyer who had represented Billie Holiday in regards to drug charges. Kennedy then came to represent Holiday's estate, and also that of Charlie Parker.

Kennedy acted in the films The Landlord (1970), adapted from Kristin Hunter's 1966 novel, in which she played "Enid", and the independent political drama Born In Flames (1983), directed by Lizzie Borden, in which she played "Zella".

Kennedy also acted in Who Says I Can't Ride a Rainbow alongside Morgan Freeman (directed by Edward Mann) and was seen on the TV series Some of My Best Friends are Men (1973).

Kennedy was one of many narrators in the second volume of a film entitled Come Back, Africa: The Films of Lionel Rogosin, which discussed African-American history as well as apartheid in South Africa. This film was created to "serve as a unique piece of African American oral history".

In 1997, Kennedy received a Lifetime Courageous Activist Award, and the following year was honored by Columbia University with their Owl Award for outstanding graduates. In 1999, the City University of New York awarded her the Century Award.

== Activism ==
Kennedy used Intersectionality as her approach to activism. Sherie Randolph, in her book Florynce "Flo" Kennedy: The Life of a Radical Black Feminist, quotes Flo as saying: "My main message is that we have a pathologically, institutionally racist, sexist, classist society. And that niggerizing techniques that are used don't only damage black people, but they also damage women, gay people, ex-prison inmates, prostitutes, children, old people, handicapped people, native Americans. And that if we can begin to analyze the pathology of oppression… we would learn a lot about how to deal with it." Kennedy kept revisiting the same aim: "urging women to examine the sources of their oppression. She spoke of day to day acts of resistance that we can all take and hold her own arrests and political actions." Kennedy summed up her protest strategy as "Mak[ing] white people nervous".

Kennedy often dressed in a cowboy hat and pink sunglasses. Another trademark in public appearances were false eyelashes, which she referred to as her "Daffy Duck" lashes, and which she used to great effect. Kennedy had a summer home on Fire Island, and was a popular fixture on the social scene there, entertaining many activists whom she invited to visit her.

Kennedy held regular salons in her apartment on East 48th Street, off Fifth Avenue, in New York City. She would preside over networking and facilitate people meeting each other, sharing ideas, and was always coming up with projects. She would give tours of her apartment, directing guests to the "filthy room" and the "dirty room".

=== Early activism ===
Her activism began early. According to Jason Chambers in his book Madison Avenue and the Color Line: African Americans in the Advertising Industry, "After graduating high school, [Kennedy] organized a successful boycott against a Coca-Cola bottler who refused to hire black truck drivers."

"Kennedy recalled being arrested for the first time in 1965 when she attempted to reach her home on East 48th Street and police refused to believe she lived in the neighborhood. From that point on, she focused her attention on combatting racism and discrimination."

She worked as an activist for feminism and civil rights, and the cases she took on increasingly tended to be related to these causes. She was close friends with fellow Columbia law graduate Morton Birnbaum MD, whose concept of sanism she influenced during the 1960s.

Kennedy established the Media Workshop in 1966, "[using] these sessions to discuss strategies for challenging the media and to stress the importance of sharing tactical information across movement lines." She and others would picket and lobby the media over their representation of Black people. She stated that she would lead boycotts of major advertisers if they did not feature black people in their ads. She attended all three Black Power conferences and represented H. Rap Brown, Assata Shakur and the Black Panthers. Kennedy also represented prominent radical feminist Valerie Solanas, who was on trial for the 1968 attempted murder of Andy Warhol.

Kennedy played a significant role in formulating the Miss America protest of 1968. The Miss America protest was used as a tool to demonstrate the "exploitation of women". Randolph noted in her book, Florynce "Flo" Kennedy: The Life of a Black Feminist Radical, that the responsibility lay with Kennedy to recruit other black feminists to this protest. During the protest multiple women were arrested and Kennedy took on their cases as their attorney.

In the 1970s, Kennedy traveled the lecture circuit with writer Gloria Steinem. If a man asked the pair if they were lesbians – a stereotype of feminists at the time – Kennedy would quote Ti-Grace Atkinson and answer: "Are you my alternative?" She was an early member of the National Organization for Women, but left them in 1970, dissatisfied with their approach to change. In 1971, she founded the Feminist Party, which nominated Shirley Chisholm for president. She also helped found the National Women's Political Caucus. Beginning in 1972 she served on the advisory board of the Westbeth Playwrights Feminist Collective, a New York City theatre group that produced plays on feminist issues. Kennedy's "position on the role of black feminists was diplomatic without being evasive."

Kennedy supported abortion rights and co-authored the book Abortion Rap with Diane Schulder. The phrase "If men could get pregnant, abortion would be a sacrament" is sometimes attributed to Kennedy, although Gloria Steinem attributed it to "an old Irish woman taxi driver in Boston" whom she said she and Kennedy met. In 1972, Kennedy filed tax evasion charges with the Internal Revenue Service against the Catholic Church, saying that their campaign against abortion rights violated the separation of church and state.

Sherie Randolph outlines in her article "Not to Rely Completely on the Courts" that Kennedy was one of the lawyers in the Abramowicz v. Lefkowitz case, the class action suit that wanted to repeal New York's strict abortion laws. Randolph stated: "This case was one of the first to use women who suffered from illegal abortions as expert witnesses instead of relying on physicians." "These tactics were eventually used in the Roe v. Wade case, in 1973, which overturned restrictive abortion laws." Kennedy was a lawyer for the Women's Health Collective and 350 plaintiffs in a similar lawsuit about abortion in New York.

=== Later activism ===
After the 1971 rebellion at Attica Prison in New York State arose as a result of human rights abuse, the issue of solidarity arose between the black power movement and the feminist movement, often forcing activists to choose between the two. Kennedy addressed the discord that feminists had against those who supported both the black power movement and feminism by saying: "We do not support Attica. We ARE Attica. We are Attica or we are nothing." In 1973 Kennedy co-founded with Margaret Sloan-Hunter the National Black Feminist Organization (NBFO), which also dealt with race and gender issues such as reproductive rights and sterilization campaigns that were aimed at specific races.

In 1973, to protest the lack of female bathrooms at Harvard University, women poured jars of fake urine on the steps of the university's Lowell Hall, a protest Kennedy thought of and participated in. When asked about this, she said:

I'm just a loud-mouthed middle-aged colored lady with a fused spine and three feet of intestines missing and a lot of people think I'm crazy. Maybe you do too, but I never stop to wonder why I'm not like other people. The mystery to me is why more people aren't like me.

In 1974, People magazine wrote that she was "The biggest, loudest and, indisputably, the rudest mouth on the battleground."

In 1977, Kennedy became an associate of the Women's Institute for Freedom of the Press (W.I.F.P.). W.I.F.P. is an American nonprofit publishing organization. The organization works to increase communication between women and connect the public with women-based news media.

A strong opponent of military and interventionist wars, especially the Viet Nam War, Kennedy coined the term "Pentagonorrhea".

== Personal life ==
In 1946, Kennedy wrote a monograph called "The Case Against Marriage", which she later summarized in her autobiography:

...the idea being that marriage is a crock. Why should you lock yourself in the bathroom just because you have to go three times a day?

In 1957, Kennedy married science fiction author Charles Dye, who had previously been married to fellow science fiction author Katherine MacLean. Dye suffered from alcoholism and died c. 1960, aged in his mid-30s. Kennedy never remarried or had children.

In 1986, on her 70th birthday, Kennedy had a birthday gala at the New York City Playboy Club, sponsored by Christie Hefner—daughter of Hugh Hefner and former CEO of Playboy Enterprises.

Kennedy contributed the piece "Institutionalized oppression vs. the female" to the 1970 anthology Sisterhood is Powerful: An Anthology of Writings From The Women's Liberation Movement, edited by Robin Morgan. In 1976, Kennedy wrote an autobiography, Color Me Flo: My Hard Life and Good Times (Englewood Cliffs, NJ: Prentice Hall), in which she wrote about her life and career. She also collaborated with William Francis Pepper on the book Sex Discrimination in Employment: An Analysis and Guide for Practitioner and Student. She died on December 21, 2000, at her home in New York, aged 84.

Kennedy was an atheist who was once noted as saying: "It's interesting to speculate how it developed that in two of the most anti-feminist institutions, the church and the law court, the men are wearing the dresses".

== In popular culture ==
Kennedy was featured twice in 2020 biopics of other women. In Mrs. America, an FX limited series about Phyllis Schlafly, Niecy Nash portrayed her, while in the 2020 Gloria Steinem biopic The Glorias, she was played by Lorraine Toussaint.

In Mel Brooks' 2023 sketch comedy limited series History of the World, Part II, Kennedy is portrayed by Kym Whitley.
