= Zenobia Powell Perry =

American classical composer (1908–2004)

- Born: Zenobia Powell; October 3, 1908; Boley, Oklahoma, United States
- Died: January 17, 2004 (aged 95); Xenia, Ohio, United States
- Education: Boley High School; Cecil Berryman Conservatory
- Alma mater: Hampton Institute; Eastman School of Music; Langston University; Colorado State College; Wyoming University
- Occupations: Composer, professor and civil rights activist
- Employer(s): University of Arkansas at Pine Bluff; Central State University
- Organization: National Association for the Advancement of Colored People (NAACP)
- Notable work: Tawawa House
- Children: 2

Zenobia Powell Perry (October 3, 1908 – January 17, 2004) was an American composer, professor and civil rights activist. She taught in a number of historically black colleges and universities and composed in a style that her biographer Jeannie Gayle Pool called "music with clear, classic melodies." Her work has been performed by the Cleveland Chamber Symphony, the Detroit Symphony and West Virginia University Band and Orchestra.

== Biography ==
=== Early life and education ===
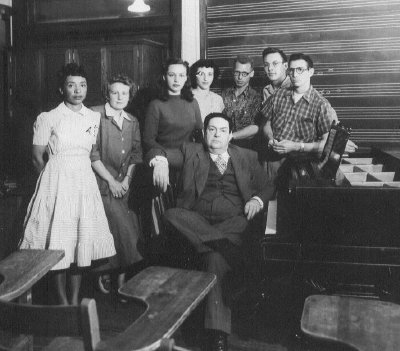
Perry (left) with music students and teachers in 1949, including Milhaud and Martens

Perry was born Zenobia Powell on October 3, 1908, in the once-predominantly African-American town of Boley, Oklahoma, to physician Calvin B. Powell and Birdie Thompson Powell (who had Creek Indian heritage). Her family was well educated and middle class. Her grandfather, who had been a slave, sang her traditional spirituals as a child, which later influenced her work.

As a child, Perry met Booker T. Washington and sang for him at his appearance in Boley on August 22, 1915, where he "declared she was a future Tuskegegian." Perry took piano lessons as a child with Mayme Jones, who had been taught by composer Robert Nathaniel Dett. She won a piano competition in 1919. Perry also learned to play violin as a child. One of her biggest musical influences, however, came from the experience of hearing Hazel Harrison in concert, after which she knew she wanted to study music.

In 1925, Perry graduated from Boley High School. Her father was not supportive of her decision to study music, but her mother was, and sent her to Omaha, Nebraska, to study at the Cecil Berryman Conservatory in 1929. After her return to Boley, Dett visited her family to ask them to send her to the Hampton Institute in Virginia, where she could study with him. However, soon after, Dett left Hampton for the Eastman School of Music and Perry decided on her own to study privately with Dett in Rochester, New York. Perry studied with Dett until May 1932. She studied composition briefly during this time with Cortez Reece at Langston University in Oklahoma.

In 1935, she went on to study at the Tuskegee Institute, and, because of her family's connection with Washington and her promise to study education as well as music, she was allowed to attend. At Tuskegee she studied with William L. Dawson who encouraged her to compose original work; she was already preparing arrangements for the Tuskegee Institute Chorus. Perry graduated in 1938.

After Tuskegee, Perry became part of a teacher training program for Black Americans that was headed by Eleanor Roosevelt. Roosevelt would become a mentor and friend to Perry and even helped sponsor her graduate studies. Perry took classes at the Colorado State Teachers College and started teaching first grade in 1942. In 1945, she received her Master of Arts degree from Colorado State College.

She began "earnestly" writing her own music during the 1950s. From 1952 to 1954, Perry worked on her master's degree in music composition at Wyoming University, where she studied under Allan Arthur Willman, Darius Milhaud, and Charles Jones.

=== Career ===
Perry worked as a professor for much of her life and began seriously composing when she was in her forties. From 1941 to 1945 Perry taught while attending the Colorado State Teachers College. Two years later, she held a faculty position at the University of Arkansas at Pine Bluff (UAPB), where she remained until 1955. During the years of 1949 and until she left UAPB, Perry toured with Kelton Lawrence as a piano duo in order to recruit students for UAPB.

From 1955 to 1982, Perry was a faculty member and composer-in-residence at Central State University in Wilberforce, Ohio. She continued to volunteer "on behalf of the African American community" after she retired.

In 1998 she was honored by the University of Wyoming, winning the Arts and Sciences Outstanding Alumni Award.

=== Work ===
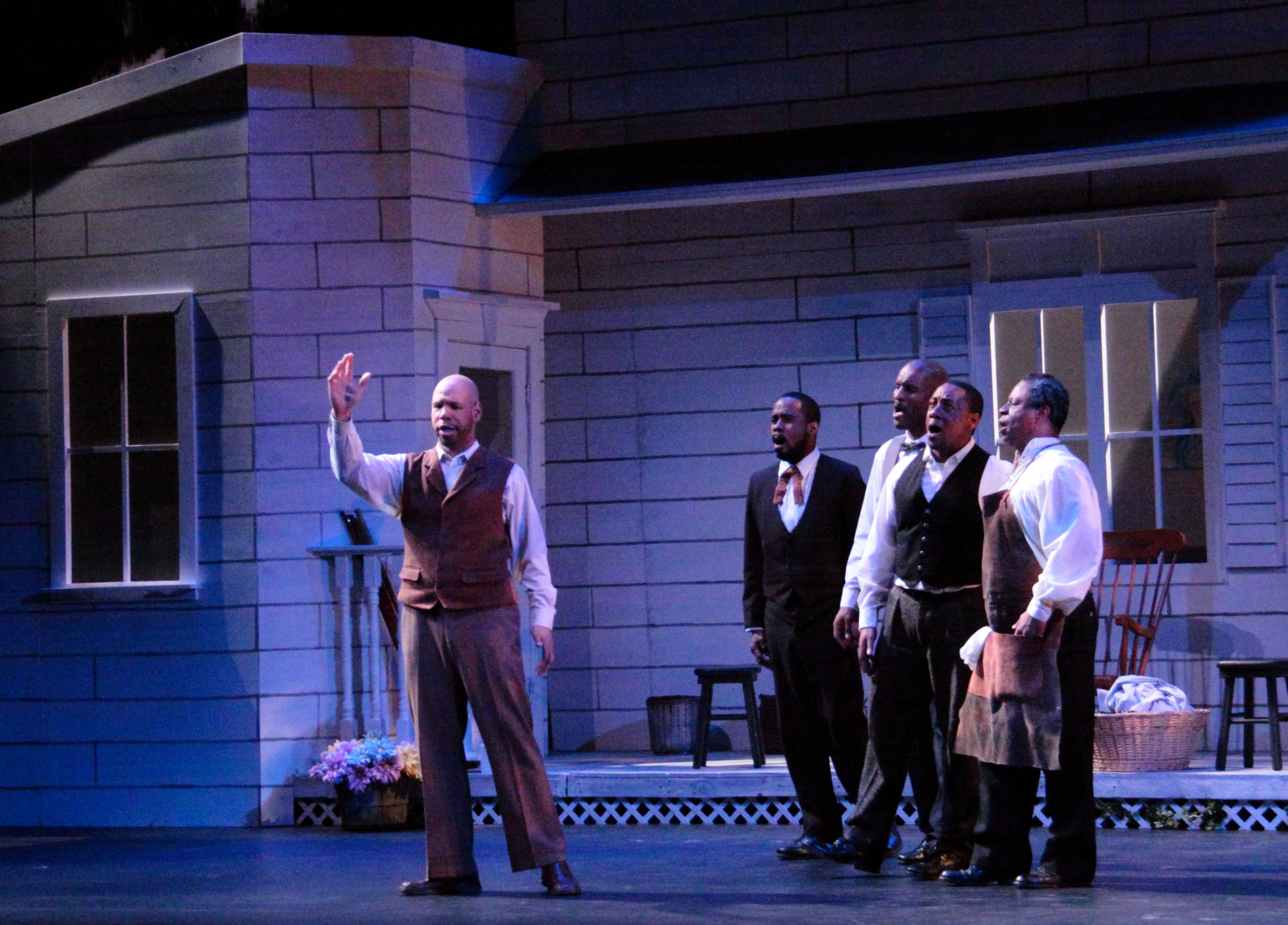
Scene from a 2014 revival of Tawawa House in Modesto, California

Perry's music is classical and "incorporates contrapuntal, tonal, mild dissonance, with some jazz and folk influence." According to biographer Jeannie Gayle Poole, she was "also influenced by black American and Native American folklore, music, language and poetry." She wrote an opera, Tawawa House, first performed in 1987 and revived in 2014. Perry also wrote for orchestra, bands and composed a mass. One of her most widely performed pieces is Threnody, a song cycle composed for her daughter set to the poetry of Donald Jeffrey Hayes. It was initially filed for copyright under the title Atmosphere: A Cycle of Songs in 1974, labeled as Op. 12.

==== Archival collection ====
Zenobia Powell Perry's papers are held at the Center for Black Music Research at Columbia College in Chicago, Illinois. The collection is titled Zenobia Powell Perry Scores and Music Manuscripts. The collection as a whole consists primarily of original compositions and manuscripts produced by Powell herself.

Her pedagogical piano works are included in the University of Colorado Boulder's Hidden Voices: Piano Music by Black Women Composers.

=== Personal life ===
In 1932, Zenobia Powell married violinist "King" Earl Gaynor. While she was pregnant, Gaynor left and she raised their son on her own. They later divorced in 1933. Her son, Lemuel, died in 1944 at age 11 of a ruptured appendix. In 1941, she married Jimmie Rogers Perry and they had a daughter, soprano Janis-Rozena Peri, in 1943. Perry was divorced again while her daughter was young. Perry raised her daughter alone while working towards her advanced degrees and studies and also while also working as a professor. Perry also supported her elderly mother for many years.

In 1962, Perry joined the National Association for the Advancement of Colored People (NAACP) to aid in the civil rights struggle.

In 1989, Perry was diagnosed and treated for breast cancer, and her health deteriorated until her death, nearly 15 years later. She died on January 17, 2004, in Xenia, Ohio, aged 95.

== Works list ==
=== Opera ===
- Tawawa House: A Musical Drama in Two Acts (soloists, SATB choir, chamber orchestra), 1985; revised 2014

=== Choral ===
- Choral Suite No. 1 (SATB corus, percussion, piano, tape sounds), 1963
- Done Made My Vow to the Lord (SATB), 1974
- Didn't My Lord Deliver Daniel? (soprano solo, SATB chorus and chamber orchestra)
- Hallelujah (soprano, SATB, and piano)
- Hymn of Praise (SATB)
- Jubilee: Fare You Well (SATB chorus, tenor and bass soloists, and chamber orchestra)
- Kingdom's Coming (SATB choir and chamber orchestra)
- O Christians, What Cha Gonna Do? (SATB choir and chamber orchestra)
- O Peter, Go Ring Dem Bells (SATB choir and chamber orchestra)
- Up Over My Head (soprano solo, SATB, and piano)
- Walk Together Children (SATB and piano)
- A Wheel in a Wheel (SATB chorus and chamber orchestra)

=== Vocal ===
- Ah Got a Home in a Dat Rock, soprano and piano (1969)
- Threnody Song Cycle, soprano and piano, Text: Donald Jeffrey Hayes (1968-1972)
- Threnody (1969)
- Alien (1970)
- Benediction (1972)
- Poet (1969)
- Pastourelle (1971)
- Cycle of Songs on Poems by Paul Laurence Dunbar, for high voice and piano (1977-1983; revised 1995)
- Sunset
- On a Clean Book
- Spring Song
- Drizzle
- Life
- Certainly Lord, tenor and piano (1974)
- They Call the Sun Ol' Hannah (baritone and chamber orchestra)
- Shine Along (baritone and chamber orchestra)
- Sinna Man, So Hard, Believe! (tenor and chamber orchestra)
- Oh I Want Two Wings (soprano and orchestra)
- I Gotta Move When the Spirit Say Move (baritone and orchestra)
- I Am a Poor Wayfaring Stranger (soprano and orchestra)
- Hallelujah to the Lamb (tenor and chamber orchestra)
- Follow the Drinking Gourd (baritone and orchestra)
- I Gotta Home in Dat Rock (soprano and orchestra)
- O de Angels Down Bowed Down (high voice and piano)
- Kid Stuff (soprano and piano)
- The Cottage, soprano and chamber orchestra/piano (1964)
- Couldn't Hear Nobody Pray, baritone and piano (1978)
- How Charming is the Place (soprano and organ/piano)
- Trouble, Trouble (baritone and chamber orchestra)
- The Hidden Words of Baha'u'llab (soprano, flute and piano)

=== Instrumental ===
- Arkansia, suite for violin and piano (1955)
- Benediction, for violin and piano (see Threnody)
- Conversations, two flutes and piano (1975)
- String Quartet no. 1
- Three Designs for Four Strings
- Two Letters for Clarinet, Cello and Piano
- Three Pieces for Horn and Piano
- Pastels for orchestra
- Mass in F-sharp minor
- Sonatine for clarinet and piano
- Four Seasons for clarinet and Piano
- Four Mynyms for Three Players (flute, oboe/clarinet, and piano)

=== Piano ===
- Vignette no. 1
- Vignette no. 2
- Times Seven
- Ties
- Teeta
- Sonatine
- Soliloquy
- Round and Round
- Rhapsody
- Promenade
- Pavanne
- Nocturne
- A Jazz Trifle
- Flight
- Childhood Capers
- Blaize
- Character Matters
- Orrin and Echo
- Suite from Tawawa House (piano 4-hands)

== Legacy ==
In 1981, Perry's daughter soprano Janis-Rozena Peri performed the song cycle Threnody at Carnegie Recital Hall in New York City.

== Honors ==
Her most important honors include:

- 1999 Woman of the Year Award, Paul Laurence Dunbar House State Memorial, Dayton, Ohio.
- 2002 Member of the American Society of Composers, Authors and Publishers.
- 2003 Elizabeth Mathias Award from the Mu Phi Epsilon fraternity of professional musicians.

Awards from Ohio institutions for her life achievements and contributions to Ohio culture:

- 1987 Honored with a Music Citation for distinguished service to Ohio in the field of music at the Ohioans Library Association.
- 1988 Honored by Ohio National Organization of Women at the NOW Banquet in Columbus, as a part of their second annual women's history celebration.
- 1991 Inducted into the Greene County [Ohio] Women's Hall of Fame.
- 1993 Inducted into the Ohio Senior Citizens Hall of Fame.
- 1998 Named as one of Top Ten women for 1998 by Dayton Daily News.
- 1999 Woman of the Year Award, Paul Laurence Dunbar House State Memorial, Dayton, Ohio.
- 2000 Named 2000 Outstanding Senior Citizen of Green County, Ohio.
- 2002 Cultural Arts Award for outstanding contributions in the field of Music Education, National Afro-American Museum, Wilberforce, Ohio.
