= Russell Sugarmon =

American politician and judge (1929–2019)

Judge Russell B. Sugarmon, Jr.

Member of the Tennessee House of Representatives from the 10th district
- In office 1967–1969

Personal details
- Born: Russell Bertram Sugarmon Jr. May 11, 1929 Memphis, Tennessee
- Died: February 18, 2019 (aged 89) Memphis, Tennessee
- Party: Democrat
- Spouse(s): Miriam DeCosta (divorced); Regina Spence
- Education: Morehouse College; Rutgers University; Harvard Law School; Boston University
- Occupation: Attorney; Judge

Military service
- Branch/service: U.S. Army
- Rank: Corporal
- Unit: Adjutant General Corps

Russell Bertram Sugarmon Jr. (May 11, 1929 – February 18, 2019) was an American politician and judge in the state of Tennessee.

== Early life ==
Sugarmon was born in Memphis, Tennessee to Russell and Lessye Hank Sugarmon. He grew up in South Memphis and attended Co-Operative Grammar School.

In 1946, Sugarmon graduated from Booker T. Washington High School when he was 15 years old.

Sugarman attended Morehouse College for one year. He received an A.B. in Political Science from Rutgers University in 1950. In 1953 he received a law degree Harvard Law School and attended Boston University's Graduate School of Finance.

== Career ==
He practiced as an attorney in Memphis, Tennessee in the firm Ratner, Sugarmon, Lucas, Willis and Caldwell.

In 1959, Sugarmon ran for Public Works Commissioner, the first African-American in Memphis to run for a major city office. The outgoing commissioner, Henry Loeb, forced most of the other candidates to withdraw from the election, so as not to split the white vote among several candidates. Bill Farris, the only white man remaining on the ballot, won the post.

Sugarmon served in the Tennessee House of Representatives as a Democrat from the 11th District from 1967 to 1969.

== Personal life ==
From the mid-1950s to mid-1960s, he was married to the educator and activist Miriam DeCosta, with whom he had four children. Their son Tarik B. Sugarmon is a Memphis City Court judge who in 2014 ran for Memphis-Shelby County Juvenile Court. He died on February 18, 2019, aged 89.

== Works and publications ==
- Sugarmon, Russell B, and Hans-Thomas Ryan. Russell B. Sugarmon, Jr., Papers, 1959-1976: guide to the Papers. Memphis: Memphis State University, 1977. See also: Mississippi Valley Collection, Memphis State University.

== See also ==
- Civil Rights Movement
