= Miriam DeCosta-Willis =

American educator and civil rights leader (1934–2021)

- Born: Miriam Dolores DeCosta; November 1, 1934; Florence, Alabama, U.S.
- Died: January 7, 2021 (aged 86); Memphis, Tennessee, U.S.
- Education: Wilkinson High School; Westover School; Wellesley College; Johns Hopkins University
- Occupations: Educator; Writer; Civil rights activist
- Years active: 1957–1999
- Employer(s): LeMoyne College; Memphis State University; Howard University; George Mason University; University of Maryland, Baltimore County
- Known for: The first African-American faculty member at Memphis State University
- Notable work: Blacks in Hispanic Literature: A Collection of Critical Essays (1977); Erotique Noire / Black Erotica (1992); The Memphis Diary of Ida B. Wells (1995); Daughters of the Diaspora: Afra-Hispanic Writers (2003); Notable Black Memphians (2008); Black Memphis Landmarks (2010)
- Board member of: Du Bois Scholars Program
- Spouse(s): Russell Sugarmon 1952–1967 (div.); Archie Walter Willis Jr. 1972–1987 (his death)
- Children: Tarik, Elena, Erika, Monique

Miriam DeCosta-Willis (November 1, 1934 – January 7, 2021) was an American educator, writer, and civil rights activist. The first African-American faculty member at Memphis State University, having previously been denied admission to the school as a graduate student due to her race, she spent her career as a professor of Romance languages and African-American studies at a variety of colleges in Memphis, Tennessee, and the Washington, D.C., area. From the 1960s, she was active in the National Association for the Advancement of Colored People (NAACP). She published more than a dozen books throughout her career, largely dealing with Afro-Latino literature and Black Memphis history.

== Early life and education ==
Miriam DeCosta-Willis was born Miriam Dolores DeCosta in Florence, Alabama, in 1934. The granddaughter of Zachary Hubert, who had been enslaved in Georgia, Alabama, she was born to a pair of African-American educators. Her mother, Beautine Hubert DeCosta, had graduated from Spelman College and Atlanta University, and her father, Frank A. DeCosta, held degrees from Lincoln University, Columbia University, and the University of Pennsylvania. She and her brother, Frank, grew up on the college campuses across Georgia, Alabama, Pennsylvania, and South Carolina where her parents worked.

DeCosta first became engaged in activism as a child, staging a student protest as a junior at Wilkinson High School. In 1950, she became the first Black student to attend Westover School, a college prep school in Connecticut, where she was known as "Laurie." She had been chosen by local advocates to integrate the school because she seemed like the kind of "nice Negro girl" whom Westover would be hard-pressed to reject.

She then attended Wellesley College, where she excelled academically, beginning in 1952. At the women's college, she was one of only a handful of Black students at the time. In 1955, she participated in the Montgomery bus boycott while visiting her mother in Alabama; observing her mother's own activism would have a lasting impact on her. During her junior year at Wellesley, she married the civil rights lawyer Russell Sugarmon, and they moved to his hometown of Memphis, Tennessee, after she graduated in 1956. The couple had four children between 1956 and 1964: Tarik, Elena, Erika, and Monique.

== Career ==
Her four-decade-long career as a college professor and administrator began in 1957, when she was hired to teach French at LeMoyne College. That year, she sought to pursue graduate studies at Memphis State University, now the University of Memphis, but was denied admission due to her race. Instead, she applied to Johns Hopkins University under her husband's name, Sugarmon, and was accepted under the assumption that she was Jewish, although the admissions officer still questioned whether a "good Jewish wife and mother" would actually leave home and enroll. She graduated from Johns Hopkins with a master's degree in 1960 and PhD in Romance languages in 1967. She was one of the first Black women to earn a doctorate at Johns Hopkins.

=== Memphis State University ===
In 1966, she was hired to teach Spanish at Memphis State University, where she had been denied admission less than a decade earlier, becoming the school's first Black faculty member. At the university, she advised the school's Black Student Association, helping to organize a sit-in of the president's office. An active participant in civil rights organizing, she served as chair of the Memphis NAACP's Education Committee in the 1960s, leading a boycott of local public schools. She was arrested multiple times for participating in civil rights protests, she and her children were maced, and she received threatening anonymous calls to her home. She would remain a lifelong member of the NAACP.

=== Howard University ===
She and her husband Russell divorced in 1967, and in 1970 she moved with her children to Washington, D.C., where she joined the faculty of Howard University.

In Washington, DeCosta married the Memphis lawyer and politician Archie Walter Willis Jr. in 1972. At Howard, she was elected chair of the Department of Romance Languages in 1974, and she established the university's doctoral programs in French and Spanish. While living in Washington in the 1970s, she became involved in other activist protest movements, including the women's liberation and LGBT rights movements.

=== LeMoyne–Owen College ===
DeCosta-Willis moved back to Memphis with her husband in 1976. Back in Memphis, she spent a decade beginning in 1979 as a professor of Romance languages at LeMoyne–Owen College. There, she founded and directed the Du Bois Scholars Program.

=== George Mason and University of Maryland ===
In 1988, a year after her husband's death, DeCosta-Willis left Memphis for an appointment as commonwealth professor of Spanish at George Mason University in the Washington, D.C., area. In 1991, she moved to the University of Maryland, Baltimore County (UMBC), where she became a professor in the Department of African American Studies and the department's director of graduate studies. She worked at UMBC until her retirement in 1999.

== Writing ==
As an academic, DeCosta-Willis was particularly engaged in African, Caribbean, African-American, Afro-Latino, and Latin American literature and culture, traveling across the Americas and to Ghana and Spain for research, and serving as associate editor of SAGE: A Scholarly Journal of Black Women and on the editorial board of the Afro-Hispanic Review. Howard University associate dean James Davis described her as "the godmother of Afro-Hispanic literature and culture." She also conducted research on the history of Memphis' African-American community. In addition to dozens of articles and reviews, she wrote, edited, or co-edited 15 books. Notable works included Blacks in Hispanic Literature: A Collection of Critical Essays (1977), Erotique Noire / Black Erotica (1992), The Memphis Diary of Ida B. Wells (1995), Daughters of the Diaspora: Afra-Hispanic Writers (2003), Notable Black Memphians (2008), and Black Memphis Landmarks (2010).

== Death and legacy ==
In 2011, DeCosta-Wills donated her personal archive to the Memphis Public Library. The University of Memphis dedicated a historical marker and renamed a building in her honor in December 2020. She died the following month, at her home in Memphis, aged 86.
