= Beverly Guy-Sheftall =

American Black feminist scholar, writer and editor (born 1946)

- Born: June 1, 1946 (age 80); Memphis, Tennessee, United States
- Education: Spelman College; Atlanta University, Emory University
- Occupations: Scholar, writer, editor
- Known for: Founding director of the Spelman College Women's Research and Resource Center

Beverly Guy-Sheftall (born June 1, 1946) is an American Black feminist scholar, writer and editor, who is the Anna Julia Cooper Professor of Women's Studies and English at Spelman College, in Atlanta, Georgia. She is the founding director of the Spelman College Women's Research and Resource Center, the first at a historically Black college or university.

== Biography ==
Beverly was born on June 1, 1946, to Walter and Ernestine Varnado-Guy in Memphis, Tennessee. She graduated high school at the age of 16 and attended Spelman College, where she graduated in 1966. She received an M.A. from Atlanta University in English and a PhD from Emory University in 1984 from the Institute of Liberal Arts. She founded the Spelman Women's Research and Resources Center in 1981, the first of its kind at a historically Black college or university. The Center also hosts the first Women's Studies program at a historically Black college or university. In 1983, she became one of the founding co-editors of Sage: A Scholarly Journal on Black Women.

Guy-Sheftall's publications include the 1995 anthology Words of Fire, about which one reviewer (Kamili Anderson) has written: "Fire can be used to burn down, burn away or burn through. Metaphorically, Words of Fire does all three. The works it includes are conventional and controversial, reaffirming and disarming. Their overall effect is overwhelming. With uncommon command and unparalleled thoroughness, the image of African-American women as progenitors, participants and propellants in the feminist movement emerges from Words of Fire — 'a stronger soul within a finer frame'."

She contributed the piece "African American Women: The Legacy of Black Feminism" to the 2003 anthology Sisterhood Is Forever: The Women's Anthology for a New Millennium, edited by Robin Morgan.

In 2004, students in her Feminist Theory class touched off a national conversation regarding the lyrics and depictions of women in music videos when they decided to engage rapper Nelly about his video "Tip Drill." The students argued that if Nelly was able to come to campus for a fundraising event, he could spend the time to engage in debate and conversation about the depiction of Black women in his videos. The foundation canceled its event when the College could not guarantee there would be no student protest.

In 2013, she was a featured feminist in the 2013 PBS documentary Makers: Women Who Make America, which highlighted feminist history. In 2017, Dr. Guy-Sheftall was elected to the American Academy of Arts and Sciences.

== Books ==
- Bell, Roseann P.; Bettye J. Parker; Beverly Guy-Sheftall, eds. (1979). Sturdy Black Bridges: Visions of Black Women in Literature. Garden City, NY: Anchor Press. ISBN 978-0-385-13347-0.
- Guy-Sheftall, Beverly (1990). Daughters of Sorrow: Attitudes toward Black Women, 1880–1920. Carlson Pub. ISBN 978-0-926019-17-1.
- Guy-Sheftall, Beverly, ed. (1995). Words of Fire: An Anthology of African American Feminist Thought. The New Press. ISBN 978-1-56584-256-4.
- Guy-Sheftall, Beverly; Byrd, Rudolph P., eds. (2001). Traps: African American Men on Gender and Sexuality. Indiana University Press. p. 342. ISBN 978-0-253-33901-0.
- Guy-Sheftall, Beverly; Cole, Johnnetta (2003). Gender Talk: The Struggle for Equality in African American Communities. One World/Ballantine Books. ISBN 978-0-345-45412-6.
- Guy-Sheftall, Beverly (2025). Black! Feminist! Free!. Third World Press. ISBN 978-0-883-78433-4.

== Awards ==
- Candace Award for Education, National Coalition of 100 Black Women, 1989
