= Brenda Eichelberger =

American black feminist, writer and counselor

Brenda Eichelberger (October 21, 1939 – November 4, 2017) was an American black feminist, writer, and counselor. She is known for being a founding member of the National Black Feminist Organization and the founder of the National Alliance of Black Feminists.

== Early life ==
Eichelberger was born and raised in Washington, D.C. where she graduated from McKinley High School and the District of Columbia Teachers College. She received degrees in English, guidance and counseling, and educational administration. She worked as a teacher and counselor in public schools in the Chicago area. She also was an adviser for a women's liberation group at a high school she taught at.

== Feminism ==
Eichelberger began her feminist work in 1974 when she co-founded The National Association of Black Feminists. She also served as the president of the organization's Chicago chapter. She acted as a therapist leading conscious raising sessions. She crafted the “C-R Guidelines for Black Men and Women” which openly discussed issues of race as well as the presence of men in the movement. The sessions aimed to inform members and assist them in being socially aware of issues that African American faced in their political climate. It was suggested that black women should engage in session by themselves (excluding black men and white women) since black women face issues unique to themselves. Some topics that were discussed were employment, health care, sexuality, drug abuse, alcoholism, women prisoners, ex-offenders, child care, and rape.

Eichelberger explained the working of consciousness-raising sessions as follows: "Before one can solve a problem, one must be aware of what the problem is. A consciousness-raising session is an excellent tool through which one can reach this awareness. After going through this process Black men and women can come together to effectuate mutual goals, arriving at the rest of the solutions. Because the raising of one’s consciousness is such a powerful force, I consider it the first step." Eichelberger encouraged Black men who intended to help the movement to provide transportation to and from the meetings, to share in household chores and caring for children so that women could be free to participate, and even to start their own group.

After the National Black Feminist Organization was disbanded in 1975 she founded The National Alliance of Black Feminists the following year. A change she enacted was to include black men and white women who were previously excluded from her previous organization. The National Alliance of Black Feminists was disbanded in 1976 due to inactivity.

In 1977, she created the survey “Voices of Black Feminism” which covered topics such as white racism, fear of dividing the Black community, and social change. Brenda took a traditional approach to black feminism focusing on intersectionality and issues black women solely face.
