= SAGE (journal) =

Academic journal

- Discipline: Women's studies, black studies
- Language: English
- Edited by: Beverly Guy-Sheftall; Patricia Bell-Scott

Publication details
- History: 1984–1995
- Publisher: Sage Women's Educational Press (United States)
- Frequency: Biannual

Standard abbreviations
- ISO 4: Sage

Indexing
- ISSN: 0741-8639
- LCCN: 89656254
- OCLC no.: 1132073552

SAGE: A Scholarly Journal on Black Women was a biannual peer-reviewed academic journal which was published by the Sage Women's Educational Press. It was established in 1984 by co-editors-in-chief Beverly Guy-Sheftall and Patricia Bell-Scott. It was "the only journal of its kind devoted exclusively to the experience of black women", and its operations had been completely overseen by black women. The journal was published from 1984 until 1995.

== Abstracting and indexing ==
The journal is/was abstracted and indexed in:

- EBSCO databases (America: History and Life, International Bibliography of Theatre & Dance)
- Modern Language Association Database
- ProQuest (Periodicals Index Online)

== Editors-in-chief ==
The following persons have been editor-in-chief:

- Beverly Guy-Sheftall
- Patricia Bell-Scott
