= National Black Feminist Organization =

American political organization

- Formation: 1973; 53 years ago
- Dissolved: 1980; 46 years ago
- Region served: United States

The National Black Feminist Organization (NBFO) was founded in 1973. The group worked to address the unique issues affecting black women in America. Founding members included Florynce Kennedy, Michele Wallace, Faith Ringgold, Doris Wright and Margaret Sloan-Hunter. They borrowed the office of the New York City chapter of the National Organization for Women. According to Wallace, a contributing author to the anthology All the Women Are White, All the Blacks Are Men, But Some Of Us Are Brave: Black Women's Studies, Wright "called (the first) meeting to discuss Black women and their relationship to the Feminist Movement."

== History ==
One of two earliest organizations formed in the Black feminist movement, the National Black Feminist Organization clearly reflected the goals put forth in the Combahee River Collective Statement, which was being developed at around the same time by some of the same women. The 1973 Statement of Purpose for the NBFO declared the organization was formed, "to address ourselves to the particular and specific needs of the larger, but almost cast-aside half of the black race in America, the black woman."

Members of the NBFO such as Florynce Kennedy and many others were culled from the civil rights/Black Power movement and the feminist movement. Many of the members did not feel completely accepted in either camp. They felt that the white women who dominated the feminist movement had internalized racist, white supremacist beliefs and that many were guilty of overt racial discrimination. The women active in the civil rights movement fared no better; their leadership was frequently ignored, downplayed, or challenged. They were also expected to subordinate themselves to the men in the movement and were frequently relegated to menial tasks. Lesbians had to deal with the homophobia or Lesbophobia prevalent in both movements. Brenda Eichelberger, one of the founding members of the Chicago chapter said this in an undated interview, "...I didn't know any other black woman felt the way that I did about feminism. I knew white women who were my friends, but they didn't have the added oppression of race. A lot of black groups were macho. I couldn't completely identify with any group. Anyway, all I need to know was that one woman anywhere who felt like I did..."

The NBFO focused its energies on the interconnectedness of many prejudices that faced African-American women: racism, sexism, classism, homophobia, and Lesbophobia. The women elected Margaret Sloan-Hunter, one of the early editors of Ms. Magazine and an associate of Gloria Steinem, as their chair. In 1974, the group was interviewed on the Ms. Magazine television program, Woman Alive! about their historic first convention. They then established chapters in several U.S. cities including Chicago and New York.

== Important events ==
=== November 30th-December 2nd ===
400 women attended the first regional conference of NBFO in NYC at the cathedral of St. John the divine. This date is important because it was at this conference where ten chapters were established. The ten chapters went on to spread over across other areas in the United States making the NBFO a more successful organization.

=== 1974-Boston Chapter: Combahee River Collective ===
The Boston chapter of the NBFO breaks away from the main organization to form the Combahee River Collective to work in a smaller group to more successfully approach issues, such as sexuality and economic development. The C.R.C. wrote in their 1977 statement that they "had serious disagreements with NBFO's bourgeois-feminist stance and their lack of a clear political focus."

== Predecessor movements ==
The group, now defunct, stopped operating on a national level in 1975 with the last local chapter ending in 1980. In her Feminist history, Daring to Be Bad: Radical Feminism in America, 1967-1975, cultural critic Alice Echols quotes E. Frances White's essay Listening to the Voices of Black Feminism, "Some attribute the National Black Feminist Organization's demise to its inability to reach any workable consensus around what constituted a Black feminist politic." After the NBFO was dissolved in 1975, Brenda Eichelberger continued her activism with the Chicago chapter of the NBFO by starting the National Alliance of Black Feminists in 1976. The new organization worked to further the goal of achieving full equality for black women whilst accepting diversity in its membership. It quickly expanded with a strong membership base and operated through 1997

== See also ==
- Black feminism
- Womanism
- second-wave feminism
