= Tangent (club) =

Social networking organization for older British ladies

Tangent is a social networking organisation for ladies aged over 45, originally intended for former members of Ladies Circle, now open to any ladies. It is part of the Round Table Family of clubs, together with Round Table (club), Ladies Circle and 41 Club.

Round Table itself was formed in 1927, a social networking and community group exclusively for men aged under 40. Within three years, their wives had formed their own group, Ladies Circle. Like Round Table, Ladies Circle was specifically intended for younger ladies, and so was only open to under 40s. In 1953, former members of Bournemouth Ladies Circle formed their own group, Tangent.

In the 1990s, Ladies Circle opened up membership to non wives/female partners of Tablers/ ex Tablers

Like the three other clubs in the movement, there are various Tangent clubs in towns and cities across the UK, and overseas.

Tangent clubs have opened their doors to non ex Circlers.

Tangent clubs are affiliated to the National Association of Tangent Clubs (NATC). The members of each club will usually meet monthly, and organise various social events, and also activities to raise funds for charity or to support the community. Clubs will often hold Friendship or Fellowship evenings and invite other clubs in the neighbourhood to attend. Members of different clubs also have the opportunity to meet at a number of Regional Lunches held throughout the year.

A National AGM is held in April each year at a different venue. The members of the National Executive are elected at this meeting, and various proposals will be debated and voted on.

The Club motto is "Let Friendship Continue".
