= Archie Walter Willis Jr. =

Tennessee politician

Tennessee House of Representatives

Personal details
- Born: March 16, 1925 Birmingham, Alabama
- Died: July 14, 1988 (aged 63) Memphis, Tennessee
- Resting place: Elmwood Cemetery, Memphis, Tennessee
- Occupation: Politician

Archie Walter Willis Jr. (March 16, 1925 – July 14, 1988) was a lawyer, businessman, and state representative in Tennessee. Elected in 1964, he was the first African American elected to state office in Tennessee in more than 70 years.

He was born in Birmingham, Alabama. He moved to Memphis in 1953 and helped establish the city's first integrated law firm. He represented James Meredith who was being blocked from attending the University of Mississippi in Oxford, Mississippi.

Part of Auction Avenue in downtown Memphis is named in his honor. The A. W. Willis Bridge is named for him. He was married to the educator and activist Miriam DeCosta-Willis from 1972 until his death in 1988.

== See also ==
- African Americans in Tennessee
- African American officeholders from the end of the Civil War until before 1900
