= Ms! =

- Genre: Women's issues
- Presented by: Margo Lane
- Country of origin: Canada
- Original language: English
- No. of seasons: 1

Production
- Running time: 30 minutes

Original release
- Network: CBC Television
- Release: 28 June – 20 September 1973

Ms! is a Canadian current affairs television program that aired on CBC Television in 1973.

== Premise ==
CBC's 1972 attempt to produce a women's issues program, All About Women, was cancelled before its first broadcast on grounds that it excessively focused on sexuality. This effort featured a wider scope of topics including abortion, cosmetic surgery and spousal abuse. Margo Lane, who was selected to host All About Women, was host of this series.

== Scheduling ==
This half-hour series was broadcast Thursdays at 10:00 p.m. (Eastern) from 28 June to 20 September 1973.
