= Margaret Sloan-Hunter =

American feminist (1947–2004)

- Born: May 31, 1947; Chattanooga, Tennessee, U.S.
- Died: September 23, 2004 (aged 57); Oakland, California, U.S.
- Writing career
- Literary movement: Congress of Racial Equality; National Black Feminist Organization

Margaret Sloan-Hunter (May 31, 1947 – September 23, 2004) was a Black feminist, lesbian, civil rights advocate, and one of the early editors of Ms. magazine.

== Early life ==
Margaret Sloan-Hunter was born in Chattanooga, Tennessee on May 31, 1947. She grew up in Chicago.

== Career ==
When Sloan-Hunter was 14, she joined the Congress of Racial Equality (CORE), a group that worked on poverty and urban issues on behalf of the African-American community in Chicago. At the age of 17, she founded the Junior Catholic Inter-Racial Council, a mix of suburban and inner-city students who talked about and worked on racial problems. In 1966, Sloan-Hunter worked with Dr. Martin Luther King Jr. at the Southern Christian Leadership Conference and in the "Open Housing Marches".

Sloan-Hunter also became one of the first editors of Ms., a magazine supporting the feminist movement. Along with editing, she traveled to speak on issues of sexism and racism throughout the United States, Canada, and Europe.

Sloan-Hunter was a founding member of Lavender Women in 1971

Sloan-Hunter paired up with Jane Galvin-Lewis, a former writer of Ms., to challenge racism and sexism as interlocking oppressions. To get involved further, Sloan-Hunter and Galvin-Lewis paired up with Florynce Kennedy in 1973 to speak on college campuses around the country. Their events became places for other black feminists to find each other and create support groups. This led Sloan-Hunter, Kennedy, and others to create the NBFO or National Black Feminist Organization. In the NBFO, many women worked to define the specific oppression black women face. Through the NBFO, Sloan-Hunter tackled some of the same race and feminist issues she grew up fighting for.

In 1975, she and her daughter Kathleen Sloan moved to Oakland, California, where they established the Women's Foundation. She also helped organize the Berkeley Women's Center and the Feminist School for Girls. Sloan-Hunter was an intersectionality activist, fighting for African American, feminist, and lesbian causes.

Sloan-Hunter published a book of poetry called Black & Lavender in 1995. This was a series of thirty-eight poems written about Sloan-Hunter's life.

== Education ==
Margaret Sloan-Hunter won many awards for public speaking in high school. Margaret Sloan-Hunter went on to Chicago City College and Malcolm X College to major in speech. After this, she received a degree in Women's Studies at Antioch University in San Francisco.

== Portrayal in the media ==
The political activism of Sloan-Hunter was portrayed by Bria Henderson in the television show Mrs. America, which aired on Hulu in the spring of 2020.

== Death ==
Margaret died in Oakland, California, when she was 57 years old. On September 23, 2004, her family confirmed she faced a prolonged illness.
