= Tawawa House =

Opera

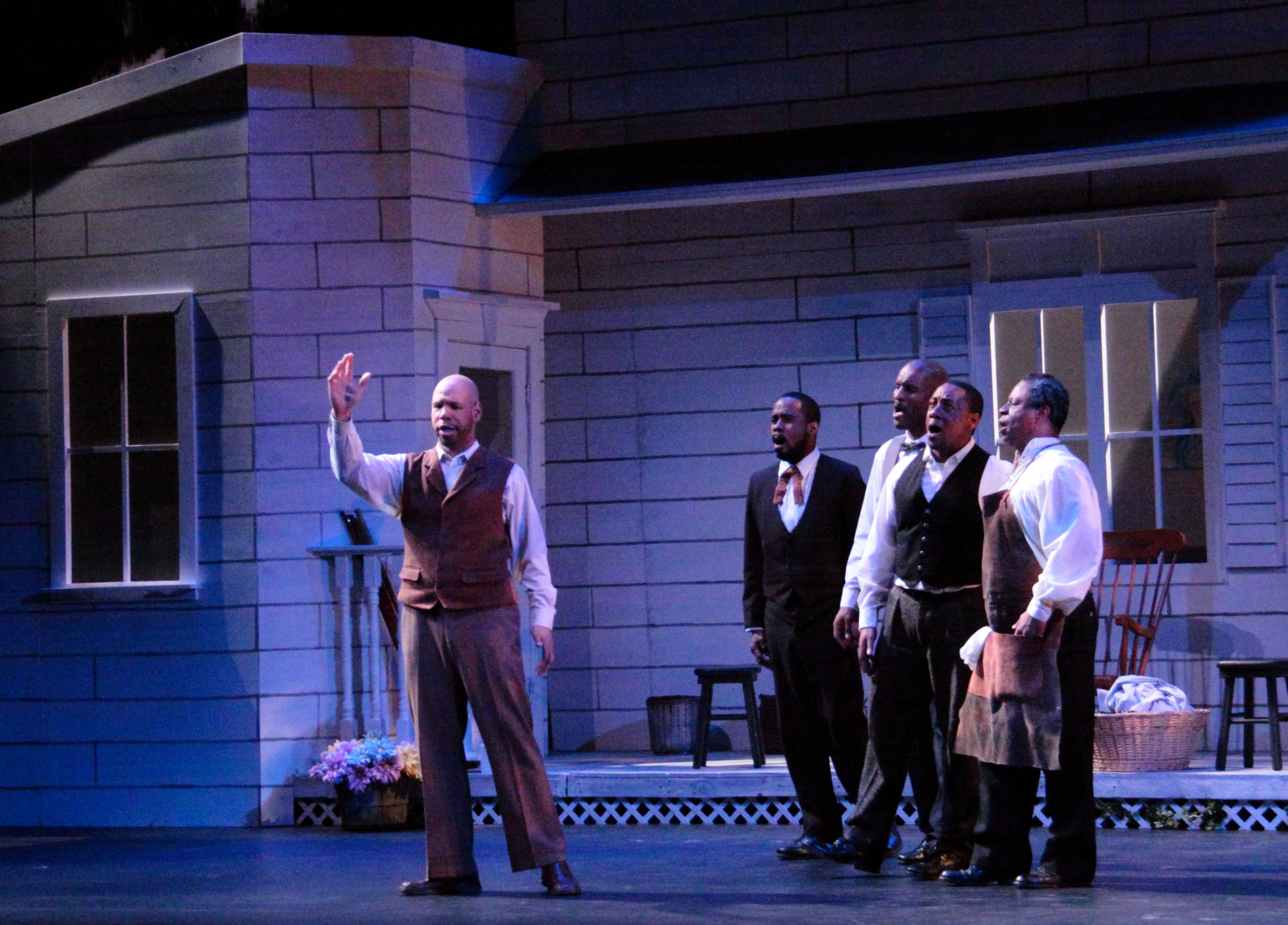
Scene from a 2014 revival of Tawawa House in Modesto, California

Tawawa House is an opera written by Zenobia Powell Perry in 1985. It premiered at Central State University in 1987. A fully staged revival took place in 2014 in Modesto, California.

== Background ==
Tawawa House is based on a real-life place in Ohio and set in 1852. In the town of Wilberforce, Ohio, there was a watering hole called Tawawa by the Native Americans in the area. A large, 300 room house, that served as a hotel in Wilberforce eventually became known as "Tawawa House." Tawawa House was "notorious for its popularity among slaveholders and their enslaved mistresses" during the 1850s. Travelers and vacationers were drawn to the natural springs in the area and stayed at the resort owned by lawyer and state legislator, Elias Drake. Slaves that worked at the hotel were able to earn their freedom and get an education. The house was also part of the underground railroad. Later, the site became Wilberforce University. Wilberforce was the first black-owned college in the United States.

Perry found the story of Tawawa House especially interesting due to her own multiracial heritage. When she first moved to Wilberforce, Ohio, she began to research the history of the town and found the story of Tawawa House. Powell dedicated the opera to her parents.

== About ==
Powell started writing the libretto in 1974. The first performance of Tawawa House took place at Central State University in the Paul Robeson Cultural and Performing Arts Center in 1987. It was staged by Lois McGuire and Cheryl Welch and the orchestra was directed by Donald Carroll. Perry's daughter, Janis, performed as a singer in the first performance of the opera. The first fully staged production with sets and complete score was not performed until 2014 at the Townsend Opera in Modesto, California.

The opera starts with an overture using "pentatonic melodic lines and harmonies based on seventh, ninth and eleventh chords. The first chorus is made up of the entire cast. Tawawa House's score, reflects the influence of her teachers, Dett, Dawson and Milhaud. Tawawa House features a "unique fusion of traditional Negro Spirituals and western classical music." Songs written for Tawawa House include "Jumping Over the Broom" and "Follow the Drinkin' Gourd." With intermission, the piece is 2 hours long. The story told in the opera involves the lives of escaped slaves.
