= 41 Club =

British social networking organization for men aged over 40

41 Club is the more commonly used shorter name for The Association of Ex-Round Tablers' Clubs a social networking organisation for men aged over 40 who are also former members of Round Table. Thus, 41 Club forms part of the Round Table Family of clubs, together with Round Table, Ladies Circle, Tangent and Agora Club International.

Round Table itself was formed in 1927, exclusively for men aged under 40, with the intention of offering younger men the benefits afforded by similar groups such as Rotary Club, which were dominated by older people. It took off quickly, and within a few years there were more than a hundred Tables in towns and cities across the UK.

It became common practice for retiring Tablers to stay on after retiring age as so-called "honorary members", however it soon became clear that Table risked itself becoming over time a group largely of older people.

The first Ex-Tablers Club was formed in Liverpool in 1936. Former Round Table members from other parts of the UK quickly followed suit, as later did former Tablers overseas (Round Table having become an international group in the post-war years).

The Association was formed in 1945 at a meeting of 41 Clubs in Wakefield and the first President, John Shuter of London Old Tablers Society, was elected. Today there over 18,000 members in 820 clubs across Great Britain and Ireland . Their primary objective remains to support The Round Table in its activities.

Members of Round Table are obliged to end their membership when they reach the age of 40 or 45, according to the country in which they reside.

Round Table was formed by Louis Marchesi in Great Britain in 1927 and 41 Clubs, which are clubs for former members of Round Table (‘Ex-Tablers’ or ‘Old Tablers’), started to be formed in the early 1940s. The Association of Ex-Tablers’ Clubs – 41 Club of Great Britain and Ireland – was formed in 1945.

41 International was formed in 1975 and is the association of (currently) twenty-eight 41 Clubs throughout the world. 41 Club is an organisation which further develops the friendship and comradeship that the members enjoyed when they were members of Round Table.

Today the associations of Austria, Belgium, Cyprus, Denmark, Finland, Germany, Great Britain & Ireland, Hungary, Iceland, India, Israel, Italy, Kenya, Malta, Mauritius, Morocco, Netherlands, Norway, Portugal, Romania, Senegal, South Africa, Sri Lanka, Suriname, Sweden, Switzerland, USA and Zambia are the full members of 41 International, but there are individual 41 Clubs in many other countries throughout the world, such as Club 41 Français in France with over 6,500 members.

41 International is led by a board which comprises a President, a Vice-President, a Secretary, a Treasurer and an Immediate Past President. An Annual General Meeting and a Half Yearly Meeting are held by the members each year. The main objectives of 41 International are to maintain, at international level, contacts between clubs and their members throughout the world and to maintain the bonds of friendship that unite all Ex-Tablers. 41 International has approximately 35,000 individual members, plus members of other 41 Clubs in many countries throughout the world.
