= Rosebud (magazine company) =

American literary magazine

Rosebud is an American literary magazine headquartered in Rockdale, Wisconsin. It was founded in 1993 by John Lehman, Publisher, Roderick Clark, Chief Editor, and Tom Pomplun, Art Director. Lehman retired from publication duties in 1998 but remains Editor-at-Large. Roderick Clark is Rosebud's current publisher and managing editor. The magazine is published three times a year, and places an emphasis on its reading and enjoyment as printed material, though it does maintain an online presence.

== History ==
Lehman first approached Clark in 1992 to help create a magazine with short stories that would be distributed from coast to coast. The first issue of Rosebud appeared in November 1993, the second issue in June 1994, having subsequent issues published each year without interruption. Usually, there have been three, sometimes two, issues published each year. Though the magazine's emphasis is on encouraging emerging writers, Rosebud has published well-known writers as well

== Contributors ==
Rosebud publishes a mix of established and emerging writers, as well as featuring the work of fine and graphic artists. Doug Moe, reporter for The Wisconsin State Journal, said in his review of Rosebud, "The writing has consistently shined, with the odd big name flavoring the mix." Following is a partial list of notable contributors.

- Achebe, Chinua
- Algren, Nelson
- Baxter, Charles
- Bierce, Ambrose
- Blei, Norbert
- Bly, Robert
- Bockman, Janine Gordon
- Bradbury, Ray
- Brooks, Gwendolyn
- Bruchac, Joseph
- Castle, Mort
- Chan, David Marshall
- Christensen, Thomas
- Cisneros, Sandra
- Crumb, Robert
- De Shields, André
- Dick, Philip K.
- Ferlinghetti, Lawrence
- Gardner, John
- Ginsberg, Allen
- Gioia, Dana
- Hamilton, Jane
- Heaney, Seamus
- Hemingway, Ernest
- Hempel, Amy
- Hughes, Frieda
- Jackson, Michael
- Kennedy, X.J.
- Kilcher, Jewel
- Kinsella, W.P.
- Langton, Daniel
- Lansdale, Joe R.
- Le Guin, Ursula K.
- Levertov, Denise
- Levine, Philip
- Mailer, Norman
- Maranhao, Salgado
- McCartney, Paul
- McGovern, Ann
- Mitchard, Jacquelyn
- Morrison, Jim
- Nimoy, Leonard
- Novakovich, Josip
- Percy, Benjamin
- Perry, Michael
- Pickering, Samuel F.
- Pierre-Roché, Henri
- Pinsky, Robert
- Raab, Diana
- Royko, Mike
- Shepard, Sam
- Shivani, Anis
- Smelcer, John
- Smith, Clark Ashton
- Snyder, Gary
- Stafford, William
- Stone, Ruth
- Strand, Mark
- Terkel, Studds
- Thomas, Aeronwy
- Thomas, B. J.
- Tutu, Desmond (Bishop)
- Updike, John
- Valente, José Ángel
- Vukcevich, Ray
- Vukelich, George
- Walker, Alice
- Weaver, Gordon
- Wilbur, Richard
- Wildgen, Michelle
- Wiesel, Elie
- Wisniewski, Mark
- Wojtyla, Karol Jozef (Pope John Paul II)
- Liu Xiaobo
- Zapruder, Matthew
- Zeldis, Chayym

== Subject-matter and style ==
Subject-matter that was initially conservative in content and tone has changed to include more unconventional submissions. As of 2015, Rosebud embraces both the more traditional and established genres in literature, as well as advant-garde pieces.

"Rosebud embraced all genres, but the one constant is stellar prose that grips the reader within the first paragraph."

Visually, the magazine is illustrated with images, artwork, graphics, and calligraphy. Sir Paul McCartney's artwork was featured on the front cover of Rosebud Issue 34 and Toni Pawlowsky's art is featured throughout Issue 60, as well as gracing the front cover with "Dog Walker" and back with "She Took That Elephant Everywhere."

== Format ==
Rosebud is organized as an anthology magazine featuring fiction, non-fiction, short stories, essays, poetry and featured art, sometimes reviews, as well as behind-the-scenes insights from writers, artists and poets on their creative process. Each issue is formatted to contain five rotating tonal groups, for example, a female multi-role theme of "Mothers, Daughters, Wives" or, again, a compound theme of "Overtime," which included working, working overtime, and over working. Tonal groups contain stories, articles, profiles and poems with themes of love, alienation, travel, humor, nostalgia and unexpected revelation, all punctuated by showcased artwork.

"Among Rosebud’s hallmarks is a blurb accompanying each story or poem describing the origin of the piece or the author’s intention for creating it—‘like a window into the interior landscape of the writer,’ says Shoshauna Shy, whose work has appeared in the magazine."

== Educational outreach and awards ==
During the school year, Rosebud is either subscribed by or donated to many schools and colleges, sometimes being used as an example of what an unconventional literary magazine looks and reads like. In addition, issues are regularly sent to urban and rural libraries. As a third method of outreach, complimentary copies are given for free to institutions housing residents.

Alongside its educational efforts to encourage literacy and reading, Rosebud recognizes fine writers and poets with several annual awards.

== Organization and directors ==
Rosebud, Inc. is a non-profit, Wisconsin educational corporation, recognized by the IRS in 1994 as a 501(c)(3) tax-exempt organization. The founding board of directors was composed of: John Lehman, Roderick Clark and Tom Pomplun. As of 2015, the board of directors consists of: Roderick Clark, president and treasurer; Johnny Smelcer, vice president; Brian Soper, secretary; and Parnell Nelson, director.

== Subscription-base and distribution ==
Rosebud is a subscription-based periodical publication with direct mailing to subscribers from its headquarters in Wisconsin. It has a circulation of about 6,000, "a massive number for a small literary journal." The national bookstore and newsstand distribution of all copies is handled by Ingram Content Group. Rosebud is sold in large chain-bookstores and many independent book retailers throughout the United States and Canada. The magazine is available to schools and libraries through EBSCO and Turner Subscription Agency, Inc. It is also available in public and university libraries.

== Affiliations and sustainability ==
Rosebud is sustained almost entirely by subscriptions, bookstore sales and small donations from readers. Rosebud pays writers for each story, poem and article in addition to offering annual awards.

Rosebud has been and is a member of several professional organizations, including the Association of Independent Publishers, Council of Small Literary Magazines and the American Booksellers Association. Articles about its work have appeared in the Milwaukee Journal Sentinel, Wisconsin State Journal, Boston Globe, Baltimore Sun and Library Journal.

On January 25, 2016 and regarding sequel films to "Fifty Shades of Grey,' namely :Fifty Shades Darker" and "Fifty Shades Freed," Universal Pictures requested permission from Clark "to use several issues of 'Rosebud' magazine as set dressing in scenes throughout the film, in order to help achieve professional authenticity, as some scenes as set in a publishing firm." Clark granted permission the following day.

== Namesake and tagline ==
"The magazine's name, with its allusion to ‘Citizen Kane,’ was Lehman's idea.

Rosebud’s tagline was "The Magazine for People Who Enjoy Good Writing," and is now "The Biggest Little Literary Magazine in the World."
