= Ora Williams =

American historian (1926–2009)

Ruby Ora Williams (1926–2009) was an American literary scholar and bibliographer, known for her bibliographies of black women's writing.

== Life ==
Ora Williams was the daughter of Ida Bolles (Roach) Williams. She became professor at California State University, Long Beach in 1968. A participant in the university's pioneering equal opportunities program, she and Clyde Taylor designed and shaped the black studies program at CSU in the early 1970s. She retired in 1988.

== Works ==
- 'A Bibliography of Works Written by American Black Women', College Language Association Journal, 1972. Published in book form as American Black women in the arts and social sciences : a bibliographic survey, Metuchen, N.J. : Scarecrow Press, 1973.
- An In-Depth Portrait of Alice Dunbar-Nelson, Ph.D. dissertation, University of California, Irvine, 1974
- (ed.) Works of Eva Jessye
- An In-Depth Portrait of Alice Dunbar-Nelson, 1975
- 'Works by and About Alice Ruth (Moore) Dunbar-Nelson: A Bibliography', College Language Association Journal 19 (1976)
- (ed.) American Black Women in the Arts and Social Sciences: A Bibliographic Survey, 1978
- (ed.) An Alice Dunbar-Nelson Reader. Washington, DC: University Press of America, 1979.
- Just like a meteor: a bio-bibliography of the life and works of Charles William Williams, a New Jersey African-American, Glassboro, N.J.: Meteor Books, 1994
