= Patricia Bell-Scott =

American scholar of women's studies and black feminism

- Born: United States
- Occupations: Scholar of women's studies and black feminism
- Notable work: All the Women Are White, All the Blacks Are Men, But Some of Us Are Brave ((co-edited with Gloria Hull and Barbara Smith, 1982); The Firebrand and the First Lady: Portrait of a Friendship (2016)
- Awards: Lillian Smith Book Award

Patricia Bell-Scott is an American scholar of women's studies and black feminism. She is currently a professor emerita of women's studies and human development and family science at the University of Georgia. As an author, she has been widely collected by libraries worldwide.

== Personal life ==
A native of Chattanooga, Tennessee, United States, Bell-Scott lives in Athens, Georgia, with her husband, Charles Vernon Underwood Jr., a retired Tennessee Valley Authority information technology manager.

== Career ==
Patricia Bell-Scott is an author and professor emerita of women's studies and human development and family science at the University of Georgia. Her 2016 book, The Firebrand and the First Lady: Portrait of a Friendship: Pauli Murray, Eleanor Roosevelt, and the Struggle for Social Justice, won the Lillian Smith Book Award and was named Booklist Best Adult Nonfiction Book of the Year by the American Library Association. This book was also named a finalist for the Andrew Carnegie Medal for Excellence in Nonfiction, and longlisted for the National Book Award.

Bell-Scott's previous books include Life Notes: Personal Writings by Contemporary Black Women (1994), which was a featured selection of the Quality Paperback Book Club; Flat-footed Truths: Telling Black Women's Lives (1998); Double Stitch: Black Women Write about Mothers and Daughters (1991), which won the Letitia Woods Brown Memorial Book Prize, and All the Women Are White, All the Blacks Are Men, But Some of Us Are Brave (co-edited with Gloria Hull and Barbara Smith, 1982), an award-winning textbook that was named to the Black Issues Books Review list of "Books that Made the Century Great."

Bell-Scott served for a decade as co-founding editor of SAGE: A Scholarly Journal on Black Women. She is a former contributing editor to Ms. Magazine. She is also a co-founder of the National Women's Studies Association, for which she served as co-convener of the inaugural coordinating council.

She has held post-doctoral fellowships at the John F. Kennedy School of Government and the W.E.B. DuBois Institute at Harvard University, as well as the Jane and Harry Willson Center for the Humanities and the Arts at the University of Georgia.

She has held professorial, research, and administrative appointments at the University of Connecticut, the Wellesley College Center for Research on Women, the Massachusetts Institute of Technology, and her alma mater, the University of Tennessee. A distinguished teacher, she is a co-founder of the University of Georgia Teaching Academy. She has also been honored by a diverse group of professional societies and institutions, including the Research on Women Special Interest Group of the American Educational Research Association, Division 35 (Psychology of Women) of the American Psychological Association, the Connecticut Chapter of the Coalition of 100 Black Women; The Journal of Negro Education; the National Council on Family Relations, the National Association for Women in Education, and the National Institute for Women of Color.

== Publications ==
- All the Women Are White, All the Blacks Are Men, But Some of Us Are Brave: Black Women's Studies (co-edited with Gloria Hull and Barbara Smith, 1982)
- Black Adolescence: Current Issues and Annotated Bibliography
- Double Stitch: Black Women Write about Mothers and Daughters (1991)
- Life Notes: Personal Writings by Contemporary Black Women (1994)
- Flat-Footed Truths: Telling Black Women's Lives (1998)
- The Firebrand and the First Lady: Portrait of a Friendship (2016)
