= George Washington Bridge =

Suspension bridge between New Jersey and New York

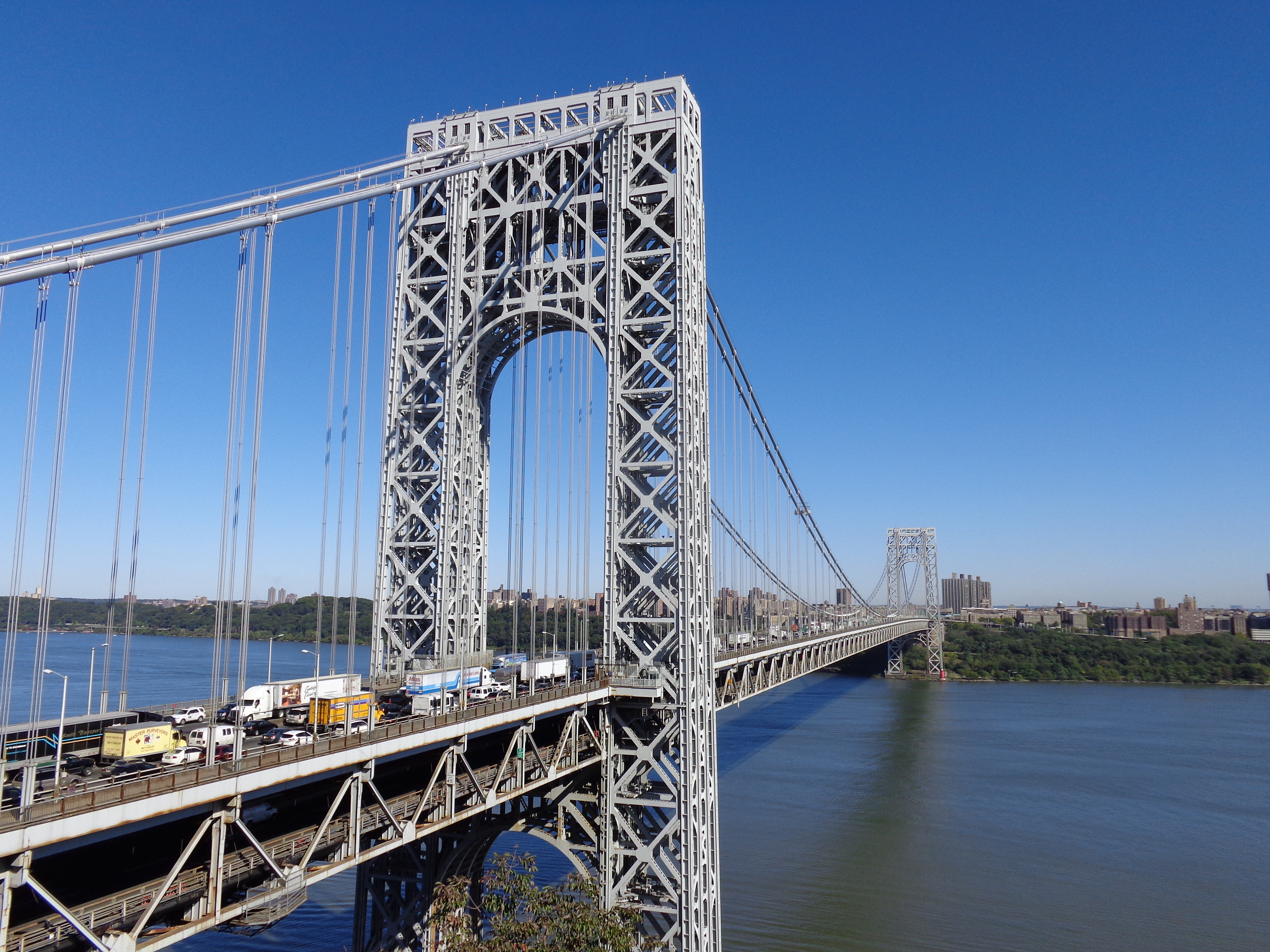
- The bridge as seen from Fort Lee, New Jersey, in September 2013
- Coordinates: 40.8517°N 73.9527°W
- Carries: 14 lanes (8 upper deck, 6 lower deck) of I-95 / US 1-9 (full length) / US 46 (NJ side); Upper deck sidewalk (north side): pedestrians and cyclists
- Crosses: Hudson River
- Locale: Fort Lee, New Jersey–New York City (Washington Heights, Manhattan), New York
- Other names: GWB; GW; GW Bridge; The George; G-Dub
- Named for: U.S. President George Washington
- Maintained by: Port Authority of New York and New Jersey

Characteristics
- Design: Double-decked suspension bridge
- Material: Steel
- Total length: 4,760 ft (1,450 m)
- Width: 119 ft (36 m)
- Height: 604 ft (184 m)
- Longest span: 3,500 ft (1,067 m)
- Clearance above: 14 ft (4.3 m) (upper level), 13.5 ft (4.1 m) (lower level)
- Clearance below: 212 ft (65 m) at mid-span

History
- Designer: Othmar Ammann (chief engineer); Edward W. Stearns (assistant chief engineer); Allston Dana (design engineer); Cass Gilbert (architect); Montgomery Case (construction engineer)
- Construction start: September 21, 1927; 99 years ago (bridge construction/upper level); June 2, 1959; 67 years ago (lower level)
- Opened: October 25, 1931; 95 years ago (bridge construction/upper level); August 29, 1962; 64 years ago (lower level)

Statistics
- Daily traffic: 278,000 (2025 average)
- Toll: For cars, eastbound only, as of July 12, 2026: Tolls by Mail: $23.30; E-ZPass Mid-Tier: $19.55; E-ZPass Peak: $16.79 (Weekdays: 6‍–‍10 am & 4‍–‍8 pm; Weekends: 11 am‍–‍9 pm); E-ZPass Off-peak: $14.79

Location
- Interactive map of George Washington Bridge

The George Washington Bridge is a double-decked suspension bridge spanning the Hudson River, connecting Fort Lee in Bergen County, New Jersey, with the Washington Heights neighborhood of Manhattan, New York City. It is named after George Washington, a Founding Father of the United States and the country's first president. The George Washington Bridge is the world's busiest motor vehicle bridge, carrying a traffic volume of over 101 million motor vehicles in 2025, and is the world's only suspension bridge with 14 vehicular lanes. The George Washington Bridge measures 4,760 feet (1,450 m) long, and its main span is 3,500 feet (1,100 m) long. It was the longest main bridge span in the world from its 1931 opening until the Golden Gate Bridge in San Francisco opened in 1937.

The bridge is informally known as the GW Bridge, the GWB, the GW, or the George, and was known as the Fort Lee Bridge or Hudson River Bridge during construction. It is owned by the Port Authority of New York and New Jersey, a bi-state government agency that operates infrastructure in the Port of New York and New Jersey. The George Washington Bridge is an important travel corridor within the New York metropolitan area. It has an upper level that carries four lanes in each direction and a lower level with three lanes in each direction, for a total of 14 lanes of travel.

The speed limit on the bridge is 45 mph (72 km/h). The bridge's upper level also carries pedestrian and bicycle traffic. Interstate 95 (I-95) and U.S. Route 1/9 (US 1/9, composed of US 1 and US 9) cross the river via the bridge. U.S. Route 46 (US 46), which lies entirely within New Jersey, terminates halfway across the bridge at the state border with New York. At its eastern terminus in New York City, the bridge continues onto the Trans-Manhattan Expressway (part of I-95, connecting to the Cross Bronx Expressway).

The idea of a bridge across the Hudson River was first proposed in 1906. In 1925, the state legislatures of New York and New Jersey voted to allow for the planning and construction. Construction on the George Washington Bridge started in September 1927; the bridge was ceremonially dedicated on October 24, 1931, and opened to traffic the next day. The opening of the George Washington Bridge contributed to the development of Bergen County, New Jersey, in which Fort Lee is located. The upper deck was widened from six to eight lanes in 1946. The six-lane lower deck was constructed beneath the existing span from 1959 to 1962 because of increasing traffic.

== Design ==
The George Washington Bridge was designed by chief civil engineer Othmar Ammann, design engineer Allston Dana, and assistant chief engineer Edward W. Stearns, with Cass Gilbert as consulting architect. It connects Fort Lee in Bergen County, New Jersey, with Washington Heights in Manhattan, New York. The bridge's construction required 113,000 short tons (101,000 long tons; 103,000 t) of fabricated steel; 28,000 short tons (25,000 long tons; 25,000 t) of wire, stretching 106,000 miles (171,000 km); and 20,000 short tons (18,000 long tons; 18,000 t) of masonry.

=== Decks ===
The George Washington Bridge has a total length of 4,760 feet (1,450 m), while its main span is 3,500 feet (1,100 m) long. Accounting for the height of the lower deck, the bridge stretches 212 feet (65 m) above mean high water at its center, and 195 feet (59 m) above mean high water under the New York anchorage. The bridge's main span was the longest main bridge span in the world at the time of its opening in 1931, and was nearly double the 1,850 feet (560 m) of the previous recordholder, the Ambassador Bridge in Detroit. It held this title until the opening of the Golden Gate Bridge in 1937. Prior to the bridge's construction, engineers had believed that a suspension span's length was a large indicator of a suspension bridge's economic feasibility, but the bridge's completion proved that longer suspension bridges were both physically and economically feasible.

The George Washington Bridge's total width is 119 feet (36 m). When the upper deck was built, it was only 12 feet (3.7 m) thick without any stiffening trusses on the sides, resulting in a deck weighing 1,100 pounds per square foot (5,400 kg/m^{2}) and a length-to-thickness ratio of about 350 to 1. At the time of the bridge's opening, most long suspension spans had stiffening trusses on their sides, and spans generally had a length-to-thickness ratio of 60 to 1, which translated to a weight of 13,000 to 14,000 pounds per square foot (63,000 to 68,000 kg/m^{2}) and a thickness equivalent to an 11-story building.

==== Roadways and sidewalks ====
The bridge carries 14 lanes of traffic, seven in each direction. As such, it contains more vehicular lanes than any other suspension bridge and is the world's busiest vehicular bridge. The fourteen lanes of the bridge are split unevenly across two levels: the upper level contains eight lanes while the lower level contains six lanes. The upper level opened on October 25, 1931, and is 90 feet (27 m) wide. The upper level originally had six lanes, though two more lanes were added in 1946.

Although the lower level was part of the original plans for the bridge, it did not open until August 29, 1962. The upper level has a vertical clearance of 14 feet (4.3 m), and all trucks and other oversize vehicles must use the upper level. Trucks are banned from the lower level, which has a clearance of 13.6 feet (4.1 m). All lanes on both levels are 11 feet 0 inches (3.35 m) wide. Vehicles carrying hazardous materials (HAZMATs) are prohibited on the lower level due to its enclosed nature. HAZMAT-carrying vehicles may use the upper level, provided that they conform to strict guidelines as outlined in the Port Authority's "Red Book".

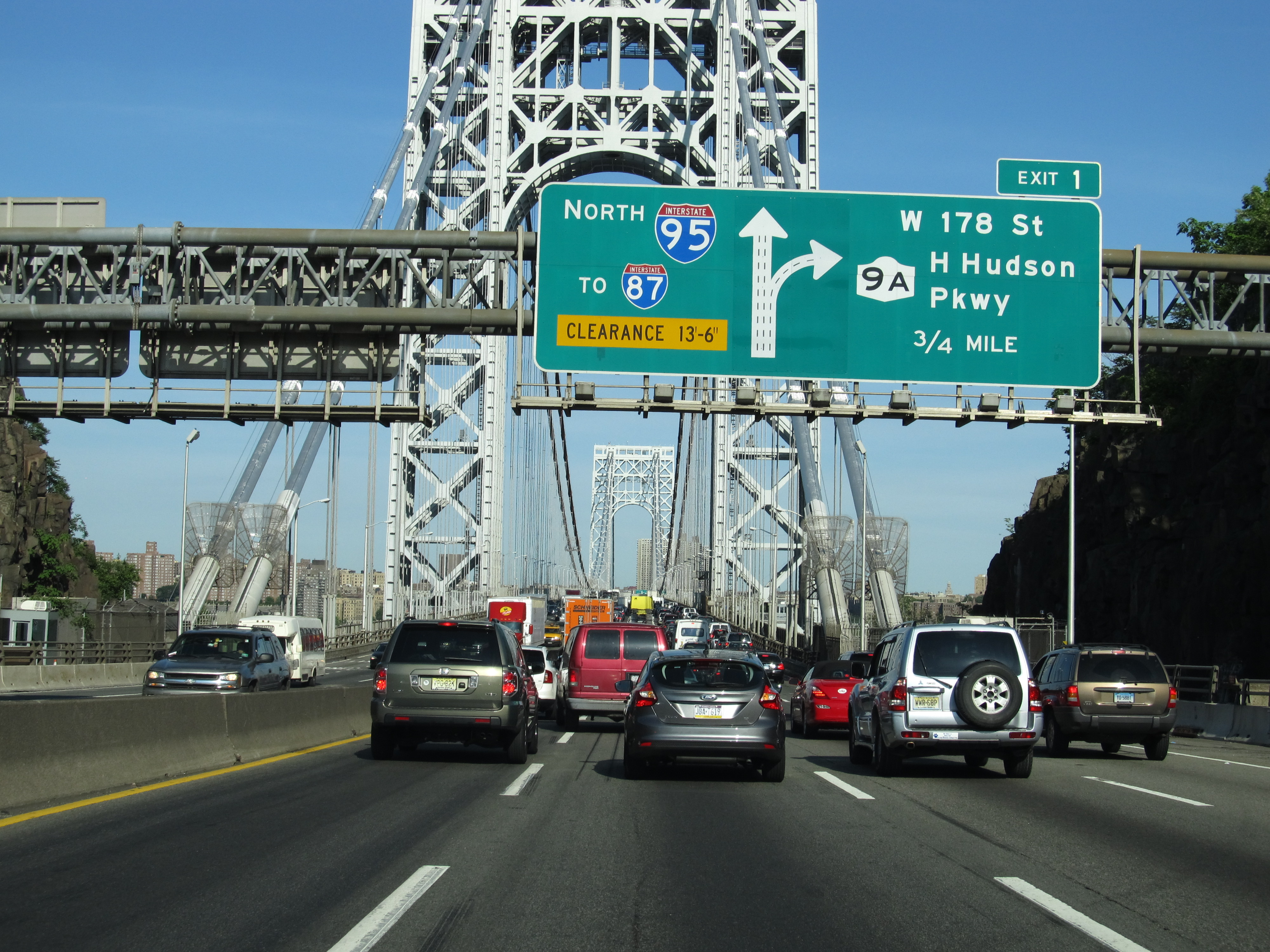
Manhattan-bound traffic on the upper deck of the bridge

There are two sidewalks on the upper span of the bridge, one on each side. The northern sidewalk was largely closed after the September 11 attacks; it reopened in 2017 while a temporary suicide prevention fence was installed on the southern sidewalk, in preparation for the installation of permanent fences on both sidewalks. Prior to the northern sidewalk's reconstruction in 2023, pedestrians had to traverse a total of 171 steps while using the northern sidewalk. As part of a renovation, the steps were replaced by a ramp, and two viewing platforms were added. As of 2024, the northern sidewalk is closed at night.

==== Stiffening trusses ====
During the planning process, Ammann designed the deck around the "deflection theory", an as-yet-unconfirmed assumption that a longer suspension deck did not need to be as stiff in proportion to its length, because the weight of the longer deck itself would provide a counterweight against the deck's movement. This had been tested by Leon Moisseiff when he designed the Manhattan Bridge in 1909, though it was less than half the length of the George Washington Bridge.

Stiffening trusses were ultimately excluded from the George Washington Bridge's design to save money. Instead, a system of plate girders was installed under the upper deck. This provided the stiffening that was necessary for the bridge deck, and it was replicated on the lower deck during its construction. The plate-girders underneath each deck, combined with an open-truss design on the bridge's side that connected the decks with each other, resulted in an even stiffer span that was able to resist torsional forces.

=== Cables ===
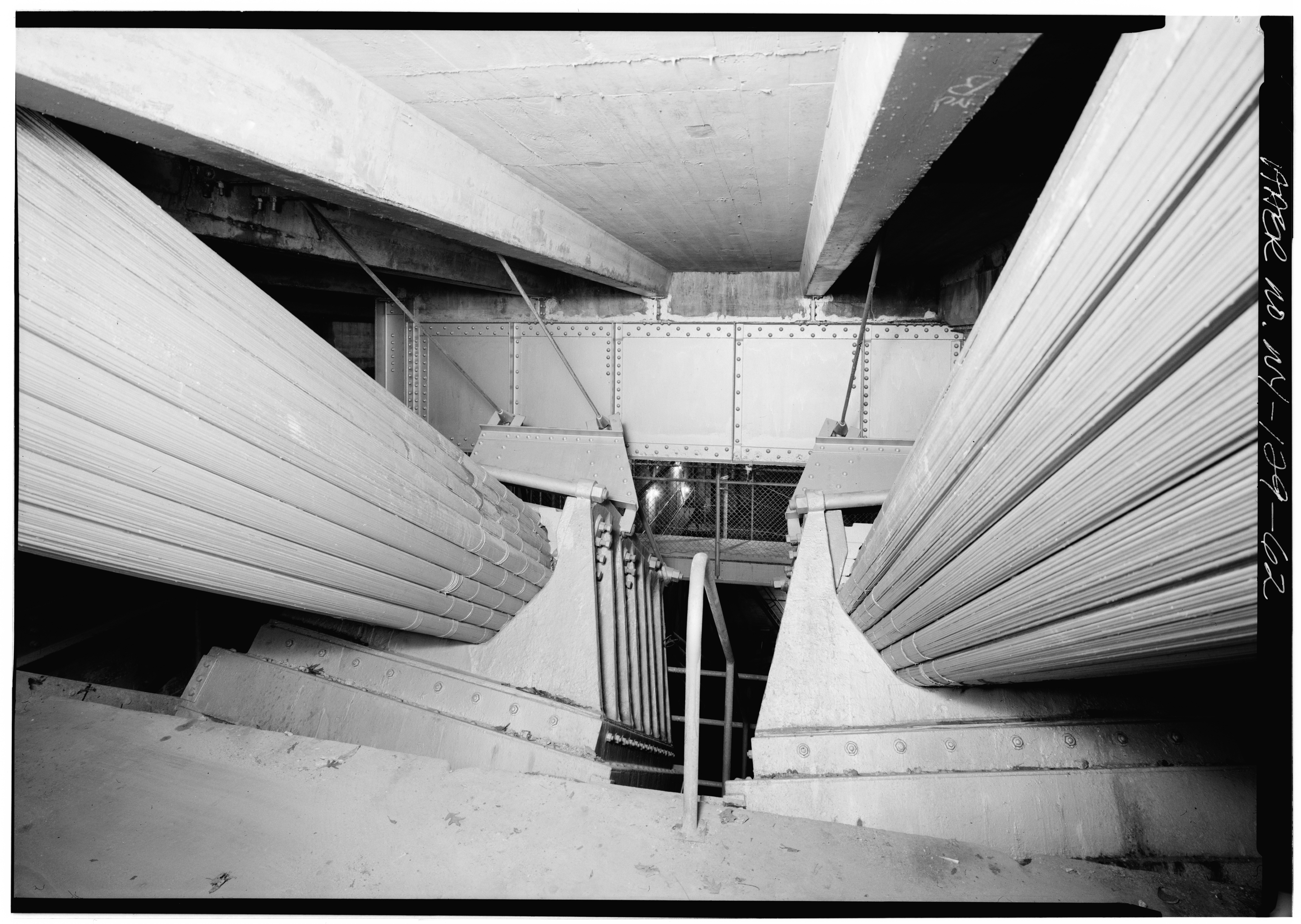
Detail of main cables in New Jersey anchorage

Four 3-foot (0.91 m)-diameter main cables support the bridge deck. Each main cable contained 61 strands of wire rope, with each strand made of 434 individual wires, for a total of 26,474 wires per main cable, and 105,986 in all. The cables are covered by a sheath of weather-resistant steel. The upper bridge deck is held by vertical suspender cables attached directly to the main cables by saddle connections; the lower deck is supported by girders attached to the upper. There are 592 suspender cables, which are 38 to 674 feet (12 to 205 m) long.

The main cables are anchored in concrete on both sides of the bridge, in a purpose-built anchorage on the New York side and bored and set directly into the cliffs of the Palisades on the New Jersey side. Originally, the end of each cable was supposed to receive one of several ornamental designs, such as a wing, fin, tire, or statue; cost-savings after the start of the Great Depression in 1929 preempted the flourishes.

=== Suspension towers ===
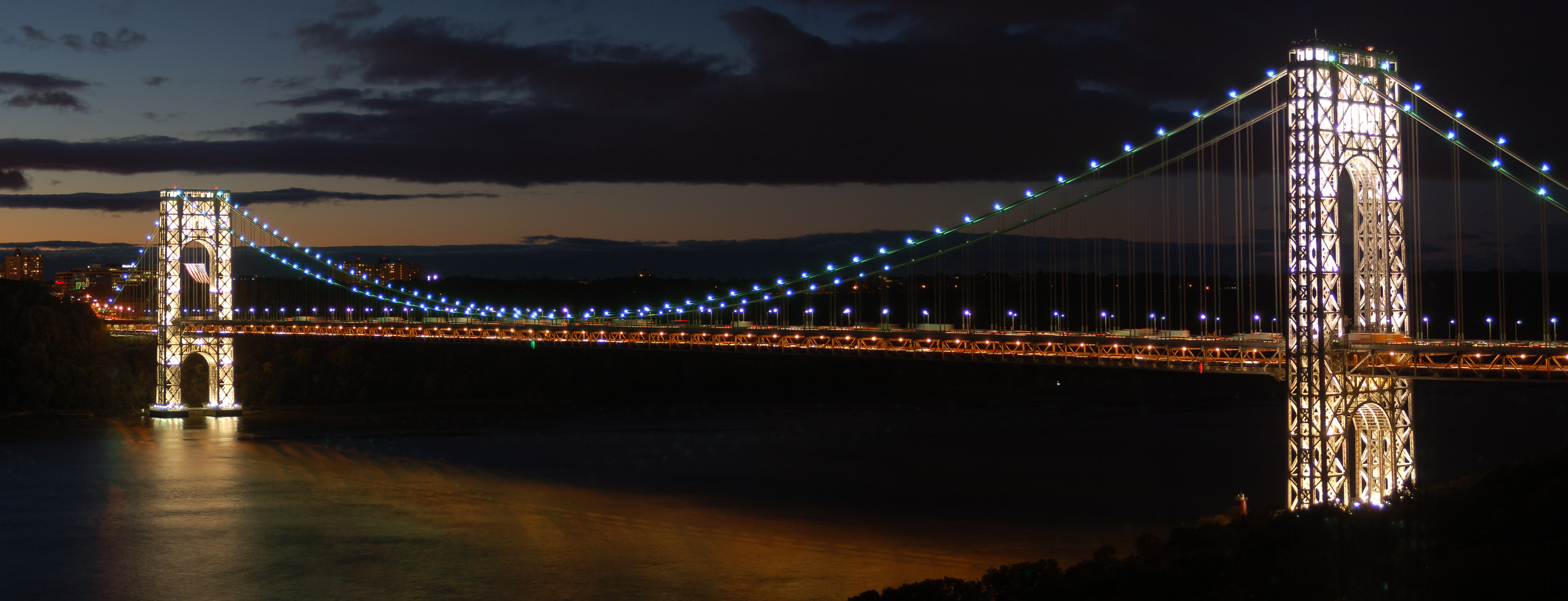
George Washington Bridge towers illuminated for President's Day, 2007

The suspension towers on each side of the river are each 604 feet (184 m) tall. They are composed of sections weighing between 37 and 40 short tons (33 and 36 long tons) and contain a combined 475,000 rivets. Each bridge has two archways, one above and one below the decks. The George Washington Bridge is classified as a fracture critical bridge, making it vulnerable to collapse if parts of the towers were to fail, although the towers are located offshore.

The original design called for the towers to be encased in concrete and granite in a Revival style, similar to the Brooklyn Bridge. Additional scrutiny of the proposed bridge's engineering found that the steel alone could support the towers, with only a decorative stone facade being retained in the plan. Elevators to carry sightseers to restaurants and observatory proposed decks at the top of each tower were also pared from the design. Ultimately, even stone facades were postponed in 1929 during the Great Depression due to rising material costs. Even though the steel towers had been left that way for cost reasons, some aesthetic critiques of the bare steel towers were favorable. Several groups, such as the American Institute of Steel Construction, believed that covering the steel framework with masonry would be both misleading and "fundamentally ugly".

While the exposed steel towers' design was negatively received by a few critics such as Raymond Hood and William A. Boring, the public reception at the bridge's opening was generally positive. The Swiss-French architect Le Corbusier wrote of the towers: "The structure is so pure, so resolute, so regular that here, finally, steel architecture seems to laugh." Milton MacKaye wrote in The New Yorker that the George Washington Bridge had established Ammann as "one of the immortals of bridge engineering and design, a genius." Ammann never incorporated masonry towers in his bridge plans again. He wrote that the "sturdy appearance and well-balanced distribution of steel in the columns and bracing" gave the bridge's towers "a good appearance, a neat appearance". Over time, the exposed steel towers, with their distinctive criss-crossed bracing, became one of the George Washington Bridge's most identifiable characteristics.

=== American flag ===
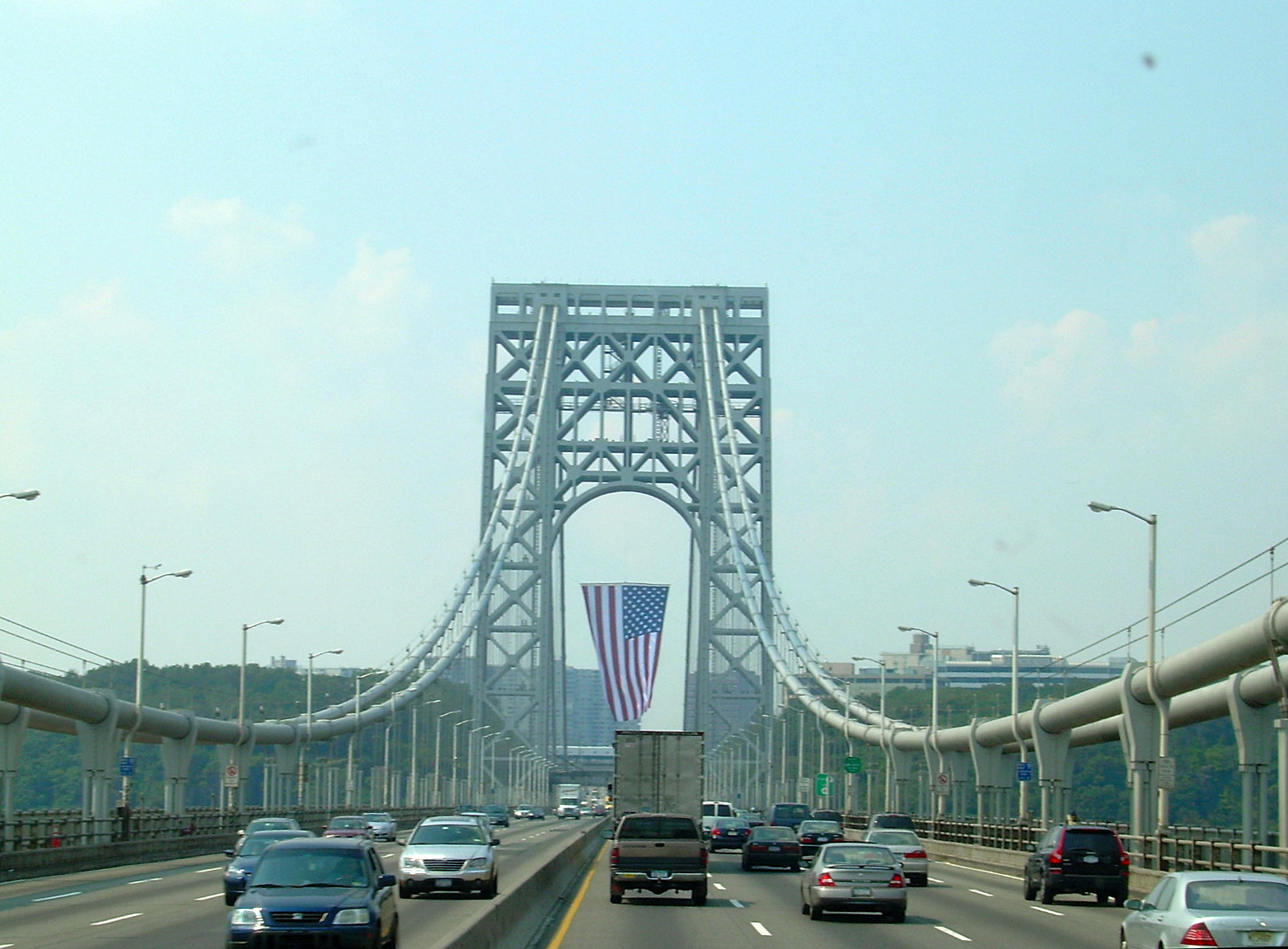
The George Washington Bridge's flag, the world's largest, is hung on special occasions

Since 1947 or 1948, (Note: A New York Times article from 1989 cites the flag as having flown since 1947, while the Port Authority gives a date of 1948.) the bridge has flown the world's largest free-flying American flag on special occasions. Hung inside the arch of the New Jersey tower, it measures 90 feet (27 m) long, 60 feet (18 m) wide, and 450 pounds (200 kg). Until 1976, the flag was taken out of a garage in New Jersey and manually erected on national holidays. During the United States' bicentennial, a mechanical hoisting system was installed, and the flag was stored along the bridge's girders when not in use.

When weather allows, it is hoisted on Martin Luther King Jr. Day, Presidents Day, Memorial Day, Flag Day, Independence Day, Labor Day, Columbus Day, and Veterans Day. Since 2006, the flag is also flown on September 11 of each year, honoring those lost in the September 11 attacks. On events where the flag is flown, the tower lights are lit from dusk until 11:59 p.m.

== History ==
The bridge sits near the sites of Fort Washington (in New York) and Fort Lee (in New Jersey), which were fortified positions used by General George Washington and his American forces as they attempted to deter the occupation of New York City in 1776 during the American Revolutionary War. Unsuccessful, Washington evacuated Manhattan by ferrying his army between the two forts. (Note: In 1910, the Washington Chapter of the Daughters of the American Revolution erected a stone monument to the Battle of Fort Washington. The monument is about 100 yards (91 m) northeast of the Little Red Lighthouse, near the eastern bridge anchorage.)

By the end of the 19th century there were more than 200 separate municipalities along the lower Hudson River and the New York Bay, with no unified agency to control commerce or transport in the area and no fixed crossing. The first was proposed in 1888 by civil engineer Gustav Lindenthal, who later became New York City's bridge commissioner. The Hudson and Manhattan Railroad and the Pennsylvania Railroad opened three pairs of tubes under the lower Hudson in the 1900s. The first vehicular crossing across the lower Hudson River, the Holland Tunnel, was opened in 1927, connecting Lower Manhattan with Jersey City.

=== Planning ===
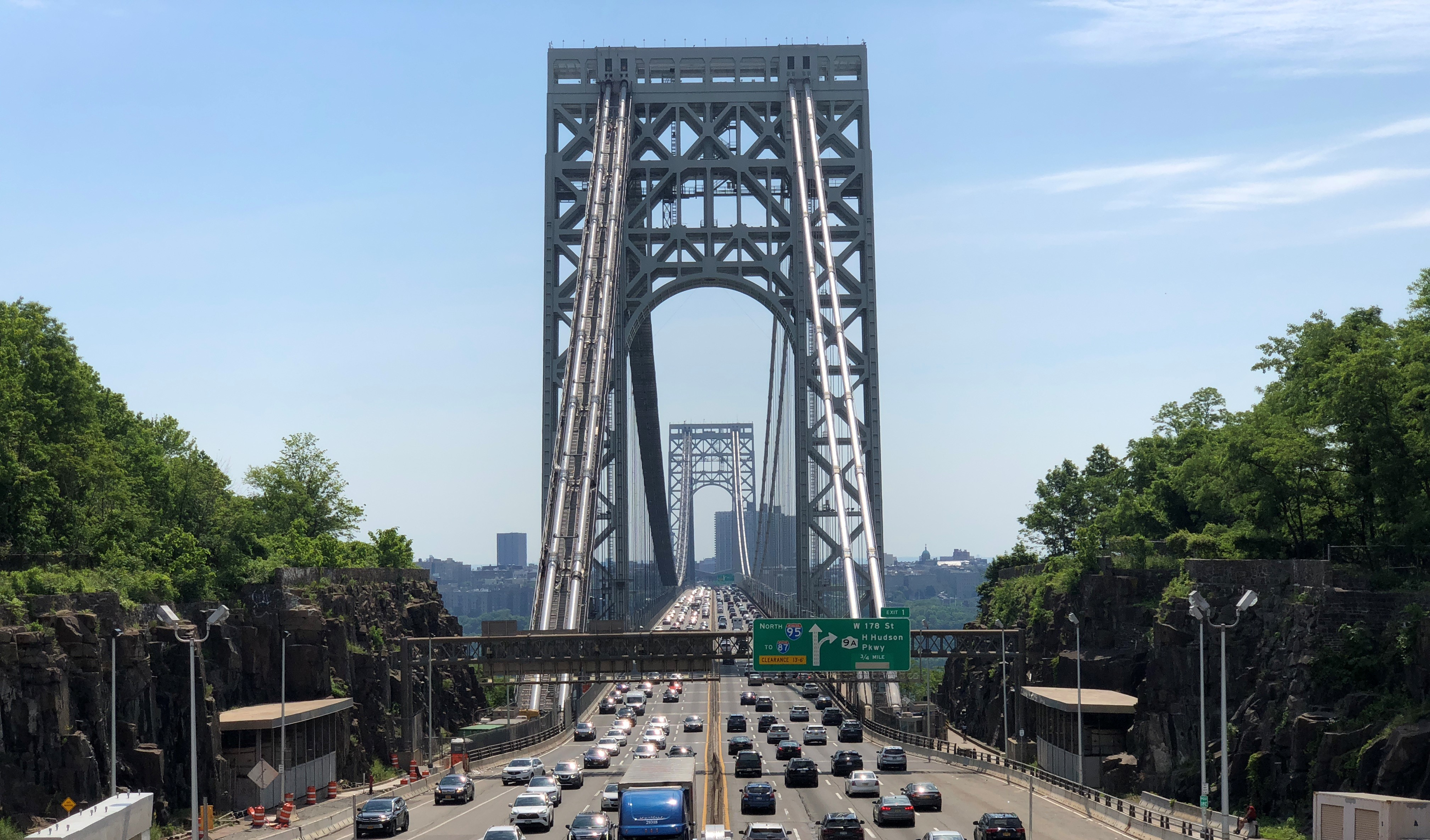
George Washington Bridge looking east from Fort Lee, New Jersey

A vehicular bridge across the Hudson River was being considered as early as 1906, during the planning for the Holland Tunnel. Three possible locations for a suspension bridge were considered in the vicinity of 57th, 110th, and 179th Streets in Manhattan, with others rejected on the grounds of aesthetics, geography, or traffic flows. In 1920, English architect Alfred C. Bossom proposed a double-decker bridge with room for vehicular and railroad traffic near 57th Street in Midtown Manhattan. The same year, Othmar Ammann and Gustav Lindenthal proposed a vehicular and railroad bridge to 57th Street in Manhattan, topped by an office building on the Manhattan end that would have been the world's tallest. Lindenthal's plan failed because it did not receive permits from the United States Army Corps of Engineers or approval from the city, and because Midtown Manhattan real estate developers and planners opposed the plan. Ammann unsuccessfully attempted to convince Lindenthal to build his bridge elsewhere, without a tower atop the bridge's terminus. In January 1924, the New York State Chamber of Commerce voted against the 57th Street location in favor of another upstream. Despite this, Lindenthal proposed that a bridge be built there, and carry 16 railroad tracks and 12 lanes of automotive traffic.

Meanwhile, Ammann became chief engineer of the Port of New York Authority (now the Port Authority of New York and New Jersey), which was created in 1921 to oversee commerce and transport along the lower Hudson River and New York Bay. He had disassociated himself from Lindenthal's proposal by 1923, conducting his own studies on the feasibility of a bridge from 178th Street in Fort Washington, Manhattan, to Fort Lee in New Jersey. Ammann's advocacy for the Fort Washington–Fort Lee bridge gained support from both New Jersey governor George Silzer and New York governor Alfred E. Smith by mid-1923. In May 1924, Colonel Frederick Stuart Greene, the New York Superintendent of Public Works, announced a plan to construct a suspension bridge between Fort Lee and Fort Washington. At that location, both sides were surrounded by steep cliffs (The Palisades on the New Jersey side, and Washington Heights on the New York side). Thus, it was possible to build the bridge without either impeding maritime traffic or requiring lengthy approach ramps from ground level.

A New Jersey state assemblyman introduced a bill for the Hudson River bridge that December. This bill was passed in the New Jersey Assembly in February 1925. After an initial rejection by Silzer, the Assembly made modifications before passing the bill again in March, after which Silzer signed the bill. Around the same time, the New York state legislature was also considering a similar bill. A dispute developed between New York civic groups, who supported the construction of the Hudson River Bridge; and the Parks Conservation Association, who believed that the bridge towers would degrade the quality of Fort Washington Park directly underneath the proposed bridge's deck. In late March 1925, the chairman of the Parks Conservation Association noted that the proposed New York state legislation would provide for the actual construction of the bridge, rather than just the planning. Ultimately, the Hudson River bridge bill was passed in the New York state legislature, and Smith approved the bill that April.

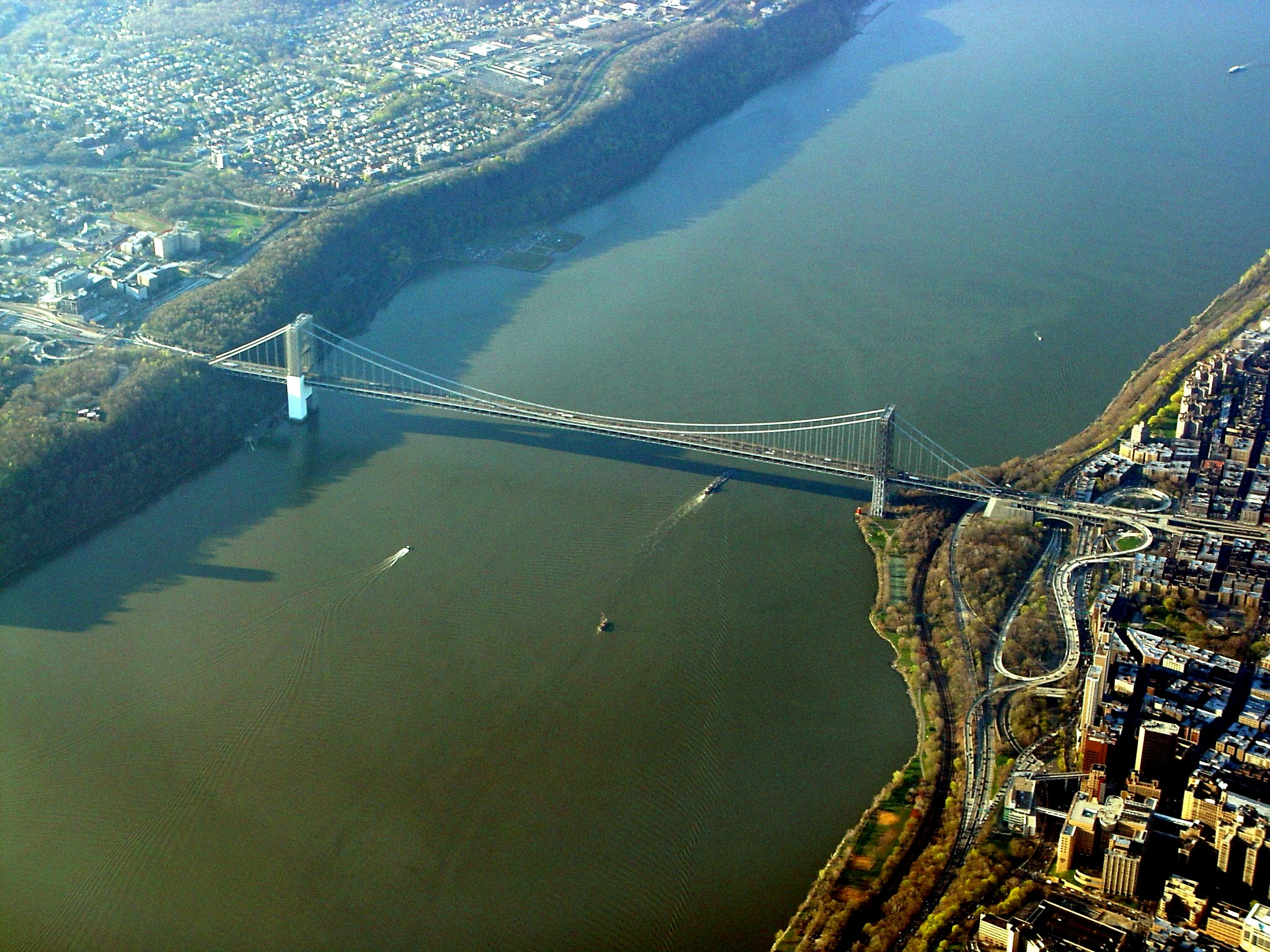
Aerial view of the bridge surrounded by cliffs on either side

In March 1925, Silzer asked Ammann to devise preliminary plans for the Hudson River bridge. Ammann found that the width of the Hudson River decreased by more than 1,000 feet (300 m) when it passed between Fort Lee and Fort Washington. The ledges of Fort Lee and Fort Washington were respectively 300 and 200 feet (91 and 61 m) above mean water level at this point, which was not only ideal geography for a suspension bridge, but also allowed the bridge to be high enough to give sufficient clearance for maritime traffic. However, the differing heights meant that a large cut had to be made through the Fort Lee ledge so that the bridge approach could be built there. The same month, the New Jersey legislature asked for funds for test bores to determine if the geological strata would support the bridge. In response to continuing concerns from park preservationists, Ammann stated that placing the New York suspension tower anywhere else would make the bridge look asymmetrical, which he believed was a worse outcome than placing the tower within the park.

The states conducted a study in mid-1925, which found that the Hudson River bridge would be able to pay for itself in twenty-five years if a 50-cent toll were to be placed on every vehicle. After funding was secured, surveyors began examining feasible sites for the future bridge's approaches in August 1925. By law, the New York end of the Hudson River Bridge could only be constructed between 178th and 185th Streets, and the New Jersey end had to be built directly across the river. Geologists made 300-foot (91 m) test bores on the New Jersey side to determine if the site was feasible for laying foundations for the bridge. Othmar Ammann was hired as the bridge's chief engineer. In Ammann's original plans for the bridge, which had been published in March 1925, he had envisioned that the bridge would contain two sidewalks; a roadway that could carry up to 8,000 vehicles per hour; and space for four railroad tracks, in case the two North River railroad tunnels downstream exceeded their train capacity. Cass Gilbert was hired in January 1926 to design architectural elements for the Hudson River bridge, including the suspension towers. The bridge design had yet to be finalized, and its cost could not even be estimated at that point due to the complexity of factors.

Gilbert released preliminary sketches of the Hudson River bridge that March; by then, the architect had decided that the span would be a suspension bridge. The sketch accompanied a feasibility report that Ammann and other engineers presented to the Port of New York Authority, which was to operate the bridge. The central span was to be 3,500 feet (1,100 m) long, longer than any other suspension bridge in existence at the time, and 200 feet above mean high water. The bridge would initially carry four lanes of vehicular traffic and sidewalk lanes; the plans called for three additional phases of expansion, culminating in an eight-lane bridge deck with four rapid-transit tracks underneath. The span would be supported by two towers, each 650 feet (200 m) tall. There would also be space to build a second deck in the future below the main deck. Ammann's team also found that the most feasible location for the bridge was at 179th Street in Manhattan (as opposed to 181st or 175th Streets). This was both because the 179th Street location was more aesthetically appealing than the other two locations, and because a 179th Street bridge would be cheaper and shorter in length than a bridge at either of the other streets. At this point in the planning process, the Hudson River bridge's estimated cost was $40 million or $50 million. Because of the proposed bridge's length, engineers also had to test the strength of materials, including suspension cables, that were to be used in the span. Ammann's research department constructed scale models of various designs for the bridge and tested them in wind tunnels.

By late 1926, one engineer predicted that construction on the Hudson River bridge would start the following summer. In December 1926, the final plans for the bridge were approved by the public and by the War Department. The Port Authority planned to sell off $50 million worth of bonds to pay for the bridge, and the initial $20 million bond issue was sold that December. Further issues arose when the New Jersey Assembly passed a bill in March 1927, which increased the New Jersey governor's power to veto Port Authority contracts. Smith, the New York governor, and Silzer, the now-former New Jersey governor who had been appointed Port Authority chairman, both objected to the bill since the Port Authority had been intended as a bi-state venture. Afterward, the then-current New Jersey governor A. Harry Moore worked with legislators to revise the legislation. The revised law was ultimately not a significant deviation from the Port Authority's practice at the time, wherein the Port Authority was already submitting its contracts to New Jersey government for review.

=== Construction ===
The George Washington Bridge's construction employed three teams of workers: one each for the New Jersey tower, the New York tower, and the deck. The construction process was relatively safe, although twelve or thirteen workers died during its construction. Of these, three were killed when the foundation for the New Jersey tower flooded; a fourth worker was killed by a blast at the New Jersey anchorage; and the others died because of their own carelessness, according to Port Authority records.

==== First contracts ====
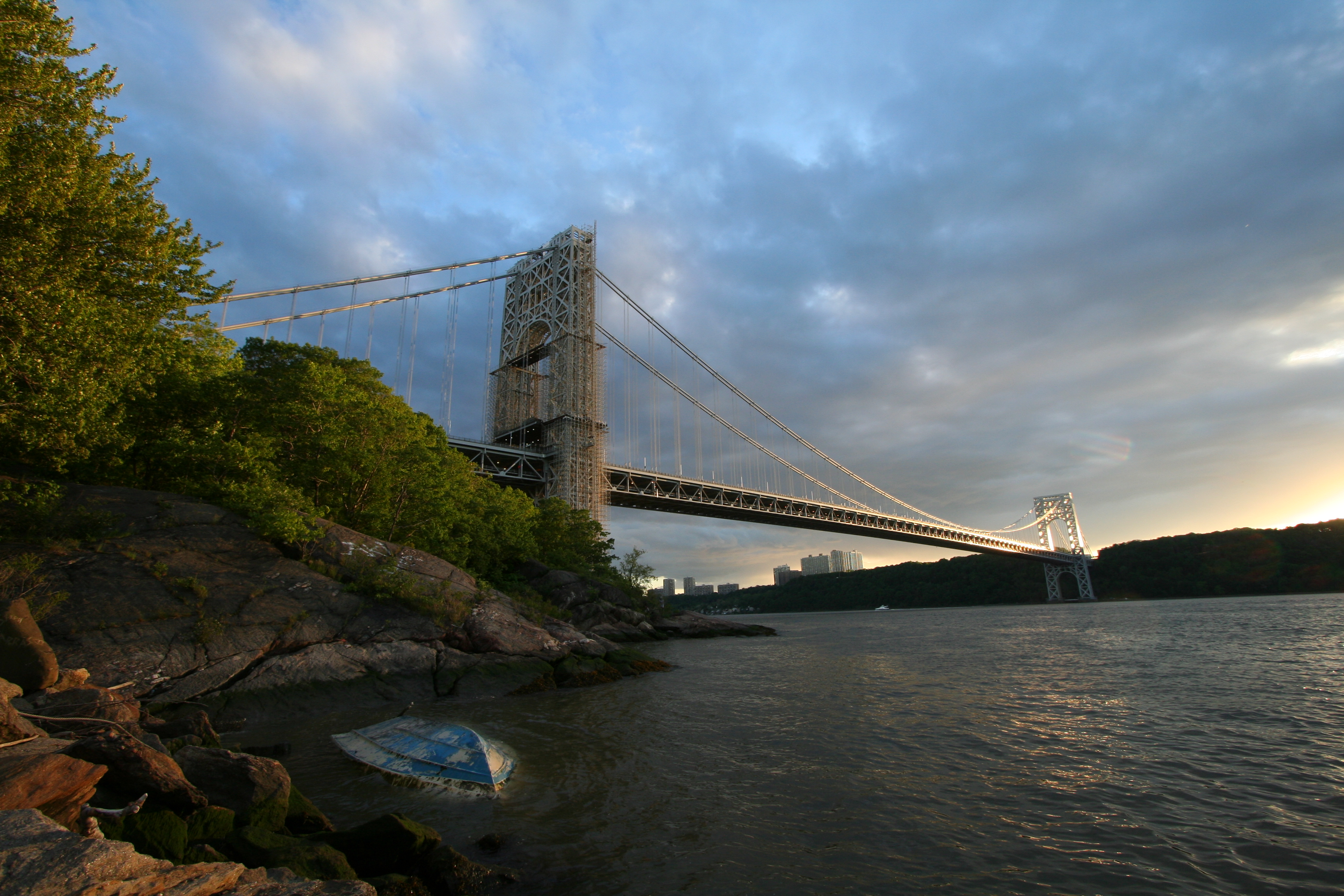
The bridge, looking south at sunset from the New York side of the Hudson River

In April 1927, the Port Authority opened the first bids for the construction of the Hudson River bridge. It was specifically seeking bids for the construction of the New Jersey suspension tower's foundation. The Manhattan suspension anchorage's location was still undecided at this time. A bid for the New Jersey tower was awarded later that month. In May, the Port Authority opened more bids for the construction of the bridge's approaches and anchorage on the New Jersey side. Dredging operations on the Hudson River, which would allow large ships to pass underneath the bridge, also started that May. By late August, the Port Authority had started condemning plots of land for the bridge's approaches.

Montgomery B. Case, the bridge's chief construction engineer, began construction on the Hudson River bridge on September 21, 1927, with groundbreaking ceremonies held at the sites of both future suspension towers. Each tower was to have a base with a perimeter measuring 89 by 98 feet (27 by 30 m), and descending 80 feet into the riverbed. The riverbed around the towers' sites was dredged first, and then steel pilings were placed in the riverbed to create a watertight cofferdam. The cofferdams for the bridge were the largest ever built at the time. In early October of that year, the Port Authority received bids for the construction of the bridge deck. There were two main methods being considered for the span's construction: the cheaper "wire-cable" method and the more expensive "eyebar" method. The wire-cable method, where the vertical suspender wires are attached directly to the main cables and the deck directly, would require a stiffening truss to support the deck. The eyebar method, where the suspender wires are attached to a chain of eyebars (metal bars with holes in them), would be self-supporting. Ultimately, the Port Authority chose the wire-cable design because of costs, and it awarded the contract for constructing the deck to John A. Roebling Sons' Company. The corresponding contract for manufacturing the steel was awarded to the McClintic-Marshall Company. The first serious accident during the bridge's construction occurred in December 1927, when three men drowned while working in a caisson on the New Jersey side.

==== Towers and anchorages ====
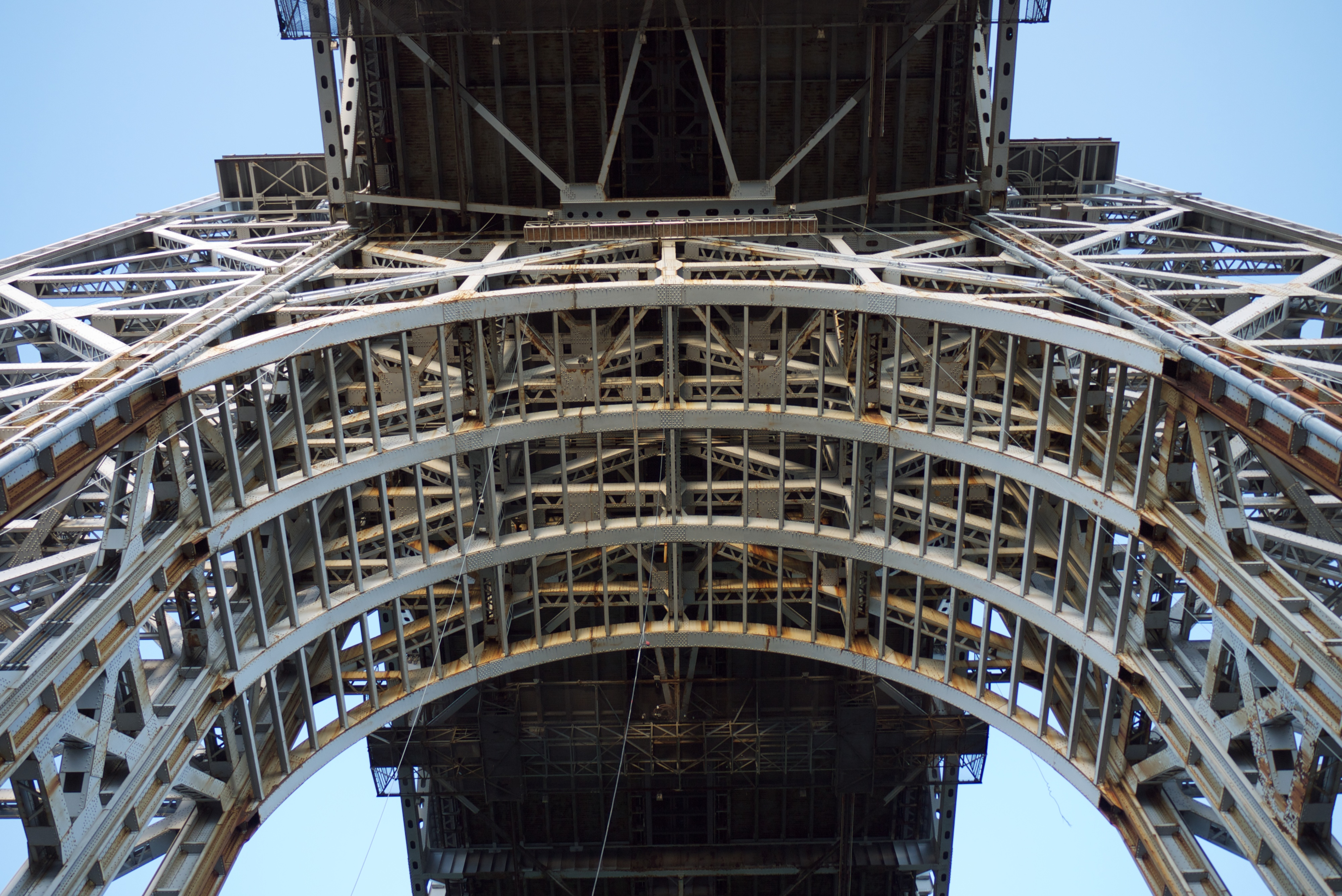
The Manhattan suspension tower, seen from below

Bids for the Manhattan suspension tower were advertised in March 1928. At this point, 64% of the total projected worth of construction contracts had been awarded. The piers that provided foundation for the New Jersey suspension tower and approaches were being constructed. The cliffs on both sides of the river were high enough that only minimal bridge approaches were required on either side. The towers' foundations could reach at most 190 feet (58 m) below mean low water, where the foundations would hit a layer of solid rock. In May 1928, builders started drilling a 50-foot-deep (15 m) cut through the Palisades on the New Jersey side so that the Hudson River bridge approach could be built. By June 1928, half of the money earned during the previous year's $20 million bond sale had been spent on construction. By that October, nearly all blasting operations had been completed. The suspension tower on the New Jersey side had been constructed to a height of 250 feet (76 m), and the tower on the New York side was progressing as well. The suspension towers consisted of 13 segments, each of which were almost 50 feet high.

The New York anchorage required 370,000 short tons (330,000 long tons; 340,000 t) of concrete, being freestanding, while the New Jersey anchorage was blasted into the Palisades. By March 1929, the concrete structure of the New York anchorage had been completed, three months ahead of schedule. The anchorage on the New Jersey side, which had been fully bored, consisted of two holes that had been bored 250 feet into the face of the Palisades. On the New Jersey side, 225,000 cubic yards (172,000 m^{3}) of rock had to be blasted out to make way for the New Jersey approach. The suspension towers were nearly complete at the time of the report; only 100 feet of each tower's height remained to be built. Anchors were being placed in the two holes that were being drilled for the New Jersey anchorage, and this task was also nearing completion.

In April, the Port Authority acquired the last of the properties that were in the path of the bridge's Manhattan approach. Plans for the Manhattan approach were approved by the New York City Board of Estimate around the same time. The approach was to consist of scenic, meandering ramps leading to both Riverside Drive and the Henry Hudson Parkway, which run along the eastern bank of the Hudson River at the bottom of the cliff in Washington Heights. The bridge would also connect to 178th and 179th Streets, at the top of Washington Heights. A third connection would be made to an underground highway running between and parallel to 178th and 179th Streets; this connection would become the 178th–179th Street Tunnels, and would later be replaced by the Trans-Manhattan Expressway. The original plan for the approach to the underground highway stated that the approach would be made using a monumental stone viaduct descending from the span at a 2.2% gradient. The Port Authority started evicting residents in the approach's path in October 1929. The same month, the Port Authority sold the final $30 million in bonds to pay for the bridge.

The plans for the Hudson River bridge's Fort Lee approach were also changed in January 1930. Originally, the bridge would have terminated in a traffic circle, a type of intersection design that was being built around New Jersey during the 1920s and 1930s. However, the revised plans called for a grade-separated highway approach that would connect to a traffic "distributing basin" with ramps to nearby highways. The total cost of land acquisition for the bridge approaches on both sides of the Hudson River exceeded $10 million.

==== Cable spinning ====
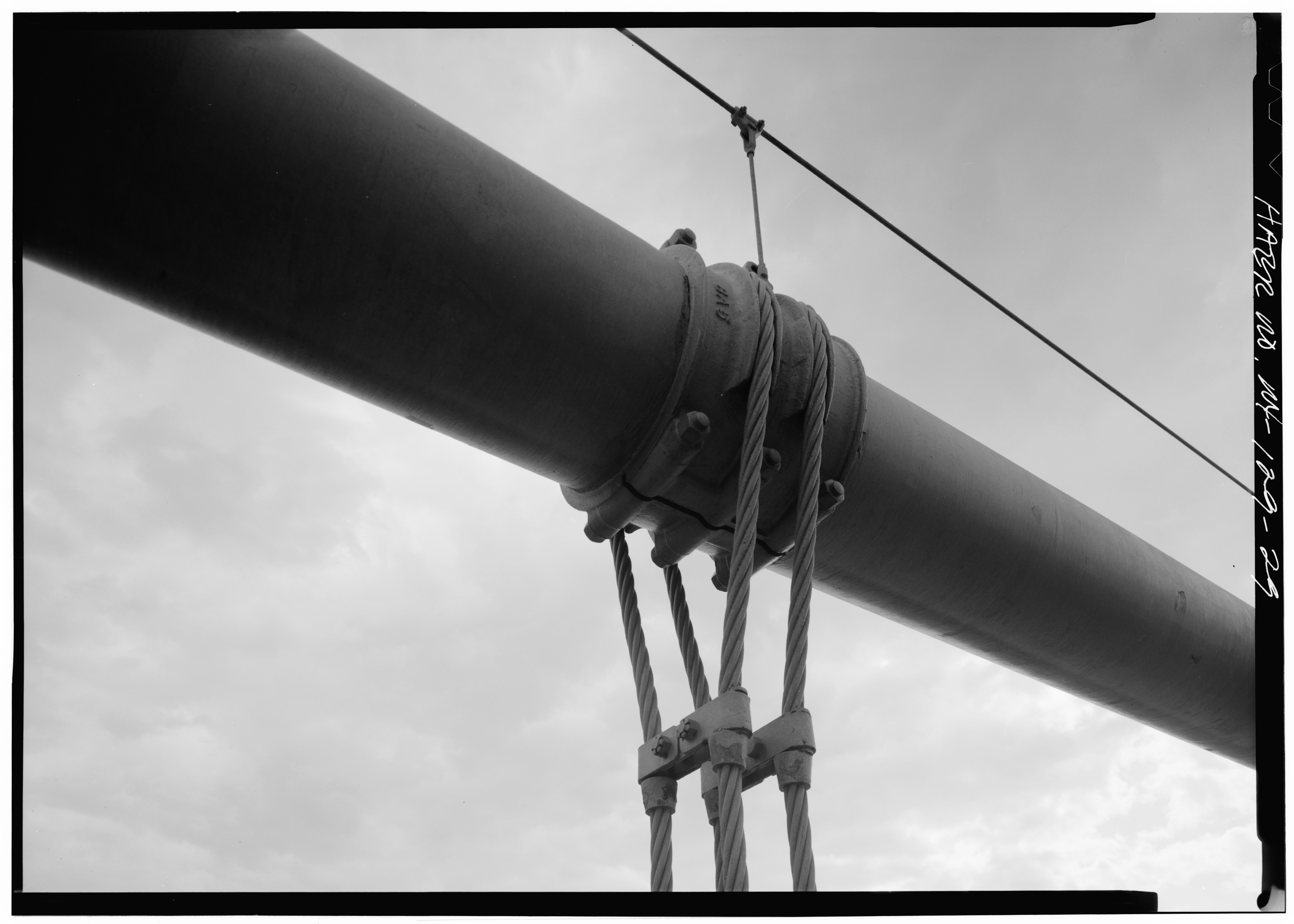
A close up view of a vertical suspender cable, which is connected to the larger main cable with what is called a "saddle"

After the towers were completed, two temporary catwalks were built between the two suspension towers. Then, workers began laying the bridge's four main cables, a series of thick cables that stretch between the tops of the two towers and carry what would later become the upper deck. The first strand of the first main cable was hoisted between both towers in July 1929, in a ceremony attended by the governors of both states and the mayors of New York City and Fort Lee. The two temporary catwalks allowed workers to spin the wires for the main cables on-site. The wires for the cables were spun by dozens of reels at a dock near the base of the New York anchorage; each reel contained 30 miles of wire at any given time. A total of 105,986 wires were used in the bridge when it was completed.

By February 1930, the bridge was halfway complete; since construction was two months ahead of schedule, the bridge was scheduled to open in early 1932. A team of 350 men was spinning the wires for each of the 36-inch-wide (91 cm) main cables, which were 22% complete. In addition, the builders had started ordering steel for the deck. By April, the spinning of the main cables was half complete. The first main cable was completed in late July 1930, and the other three main cables were completed that August, with the laying of the last wire being marked by a ceremony. The spinning of the main cables had taken ten months in total.

After the main cables were laid, workers spun the suspender wires that connected the main cables with the deck. When it was finished, the system of cables would support 90,000 short tons (80,000 long tons) of the deck's weight, though the cables would be strong enough to carry 350,000 short tons (310,000 long tons), four times as much weight. The construction of a lower deck for rail usage was postponed, since the start of the Depression meant that there would not be enough railroad traffic to justify the construction of such a deck in the near future.

==== Nearing completion ====
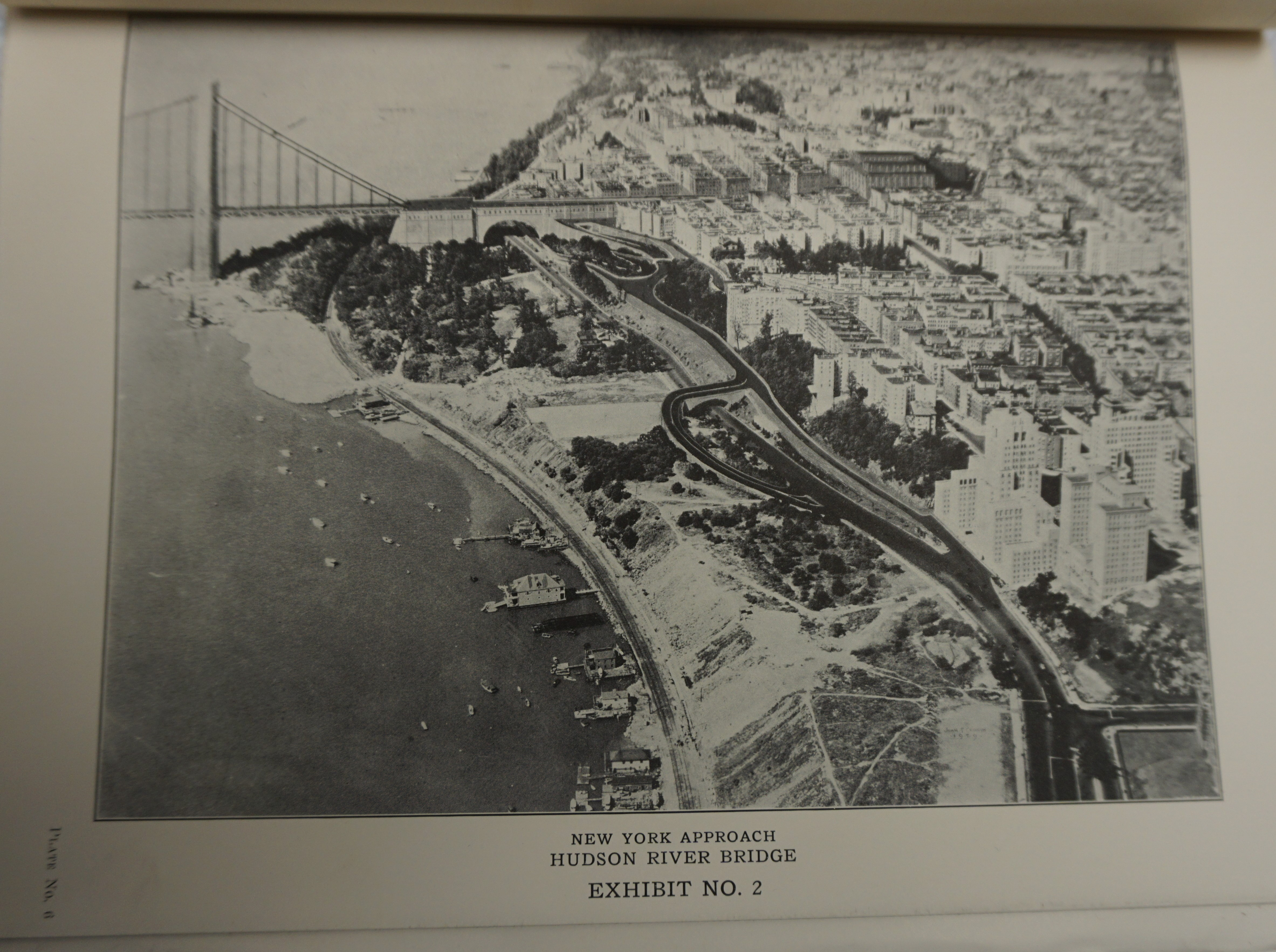
An aerial image included as Exhibit 2 of the "1930 Agreement" between the Port of New York Authority and the City of New York

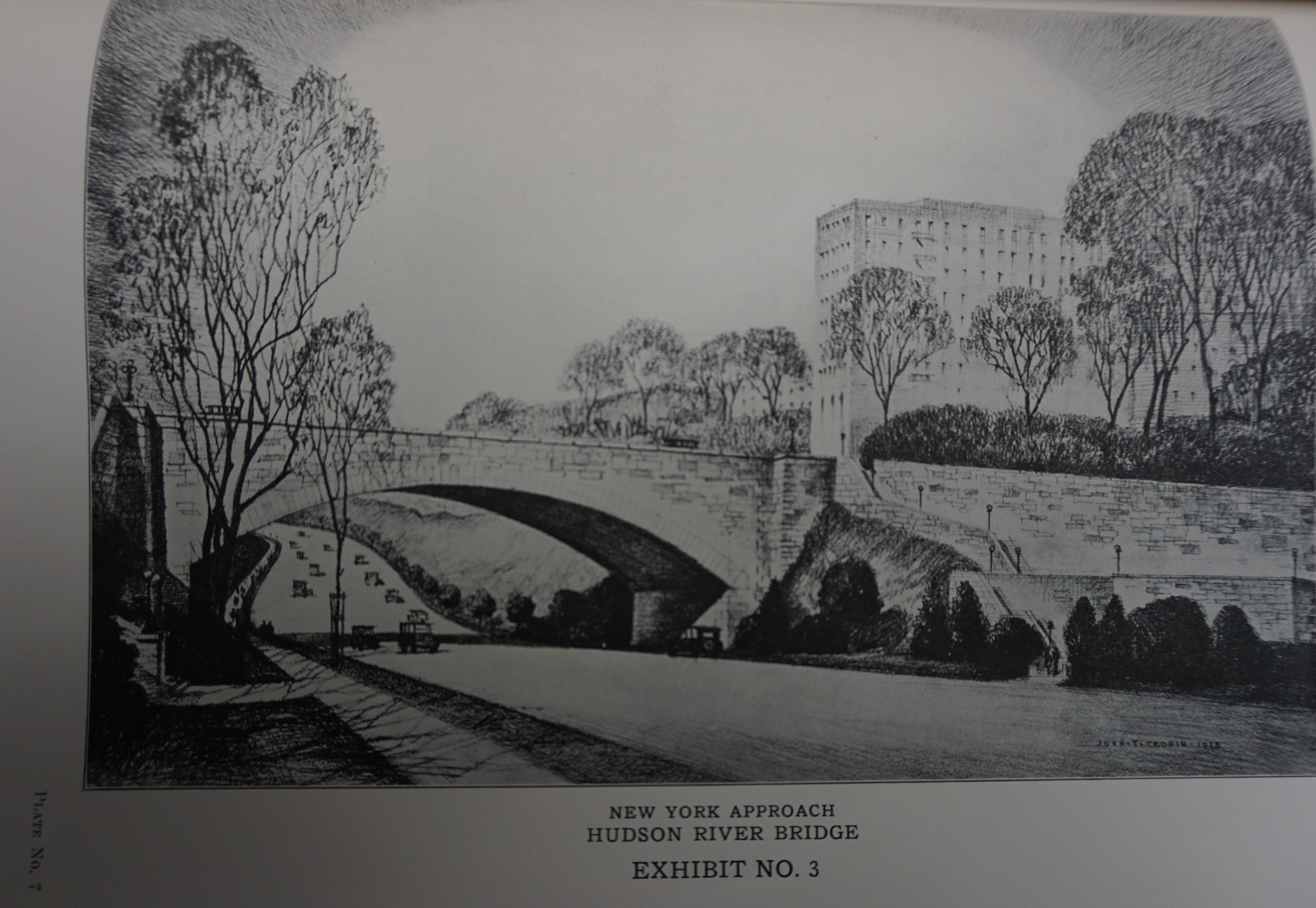
An exhibit in the "1930 Agreement" between the Port of New York Authority and the City of New York depicts a roadway connection over Riverside Drive

An agreement between the Port of New York Authority and the City of New York, dated July 29, 1930, was formed to convey property and property easements granted in relation to the New York Approach to the then Hudson River Bridge. That month, the Port Authority opened the bidding process for contracts to build the Hudson River bridge's approaches on the New York side. These included contracts for the 178th–179th Street Tunnels and the Riverside Drive connection. The tunnel contracts were awarded later that month. In August, the bidding process for the Fort Lee approaches was opened. Bids for the Riverside Drive connection were received the following month.

Prior to and during construction, the bridge was unofficially known as the "Hudson River Bridge" or "Fort Lee Bridge". The Hudson River Bridge Association started seeking suggestions for the bridge's official name in October 1930. Residents of New York and New Jersey were encouraged to send naming choices to the association, which would then forward the suggestions to the Port Authority. According to ballot voting submitted to the Port Authority, the "Hudson River Bridge" name was the most popular choice. The Port Authority preferred the name "George Washington Memorial Bridge", which had been proposed by a board member, and still others championed the name "Palisades Bridge". However, the Port Authority formally adopted the "George Washington" name on January 13, 1931, honoring the general and future president's evacuation of Manhattan at the bridge's location during the Revolutionary War. This was described as potentially confusing, since there was already a "Washington Bridge" connecting 181st Street with the Bronx, directly across Manhattan from the "George Washington Bridge" across the Hudson River. Shortly afterward, the Port Authority Board of Commissioners voted to reconsider the renaming of the Hudson River Bridge, stating that it was open to alternate names. Hundreds of naming choices had been submitted by this time. The most popular naming choices were those of Washington, Christopher Columbus, and Hudson River namesake Henry Hudson. The span was again officially named for George Washington in April 1931. This decision was applauded by then-congressman Fiorello La Guardia, who felt that other options "insulted the memory of our first President and encouraged the Reds".

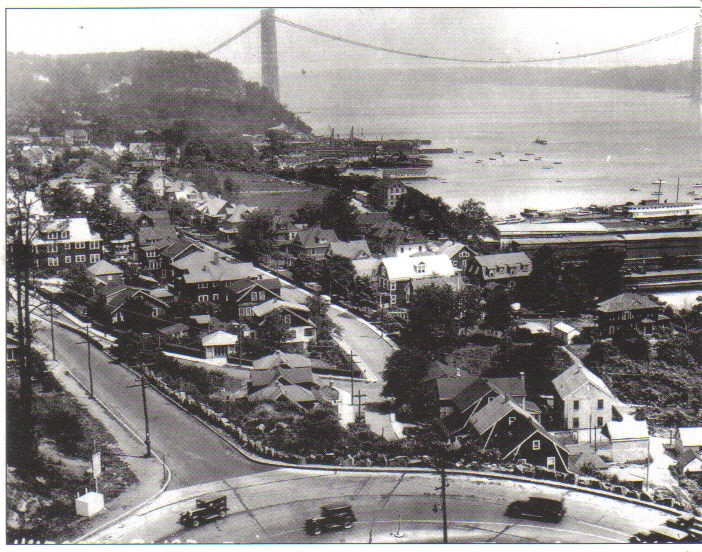
View of the bridge looking north from Edgewater, New Jersey, early 1931

The system of girders to support the deck was installed throughout 1930, and the last girder was installed in late December 1930. In March 1931, the Port Authority announced that the Hudson River Bridge was set to open later that year, rather than in 1932 as originally planned. At that time, the Port Authority had opened bids for paving the road surface. Later that month, the agency published a report, which stated that the bridge's early opening date was attributable to how quickly and efficiently the various materials had been transported. In June 1931, forty bankers became the first people to cross the bridge.

Work was progressing quickly on the bridge approaches in New Jersey, and the New York City government was considering building another bridge between Manhattan and the Bronx (the Alexander Hamilton Bridge) to connect with the George Washington Bridge. Bids for constructing tollbooths and floodlight towers were opened in July 1931.

=== 1930s to mid-1950s ===
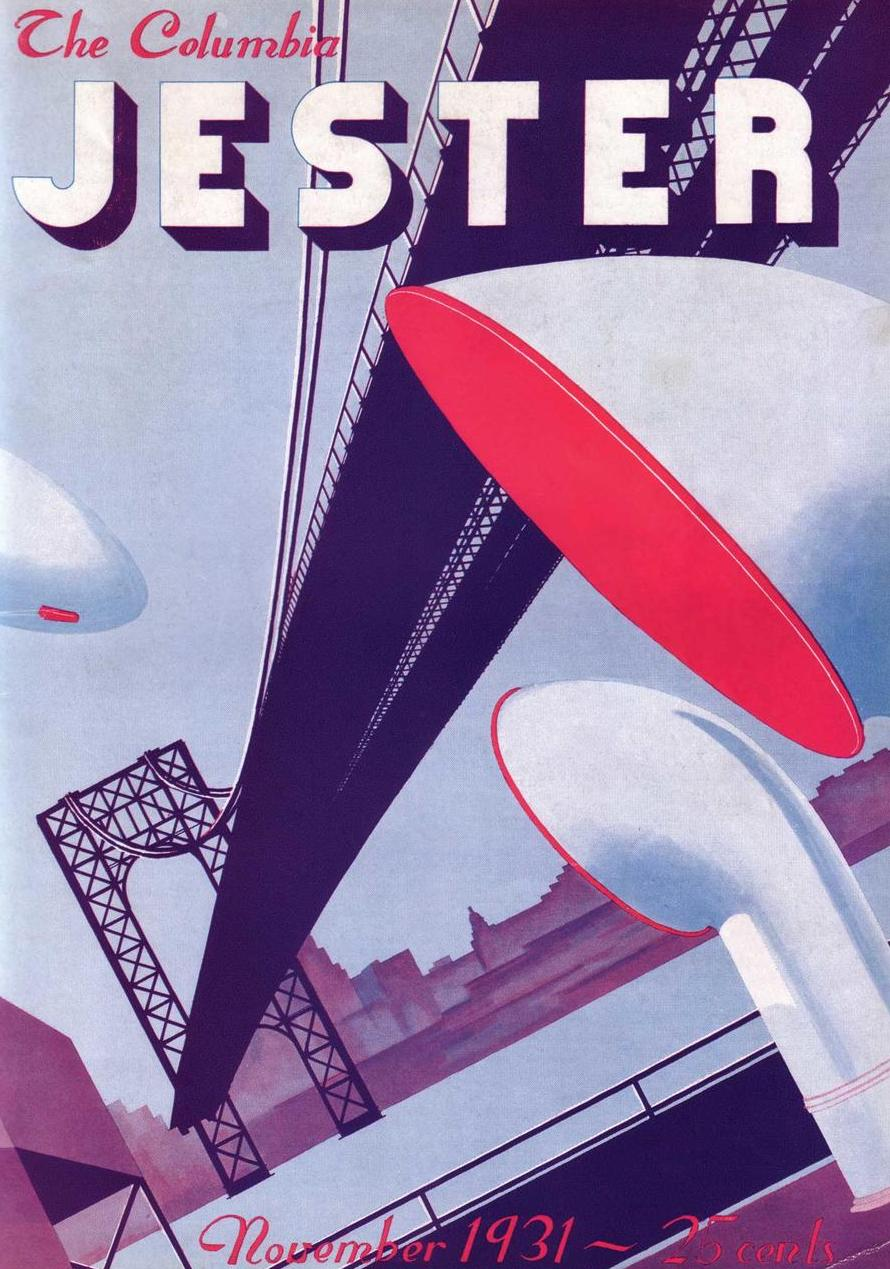
The cover of the November 1931 edition of the Jester of Columbia, the humor magazine at Columbia University, celebrating the opening of the George Washington Bridge

The George Washington Bridge was dedicated on October 24, 1931, and the bridge opened to traffic on October 25, 1931, eight months ahead of schedule. The opening ceremony, attended by 30,000 guests, was accompanied by a show from military airplanes, as well as speeches from politicians including Morgan Foster Larson, the governor of New Jersey, and Franklin D. Roosevelt, the governor of New York. The first people to cross the George Washington Bridge were reportedly two elementary school students who roller-skated across the bridge from the New York side. Pedestrians were allowed to walk the length of the George Washington Bridge between 6 p.m. and 11 p.m. The bridge was formally opened to traffic the next day. The Port Authority collected tolls for drivers who used the bridge in either direction; as with the Holland Tunnel, the toll was set at 50 cents for passenger cars, with different toll rates for other vehicle types. Pedestrians paid a toll of 10 cents each, which was lowered to 5 cents in 1934. Within the first 24 hours of the George Washington Bridge's official opening, 56,312 cars used the span, as well as 100,000 pedestrians (including those who had walked across after the ceremony). The Port Authority reported that 33,540 pedestrians crossed the bridge on the first day, of which 20,000 paid a toll to cross.

During the George Washington Bridge's construction, the cost of the bridge was estimated at $75 million, and the bridge was expected to carry eight million vehicles and 1.5 million pedestrians in its first year. When the George Washington Bridge opened, it was estimated that eight million vehicles would use the bridge in its first year, and that the bridge could ultimately carry 60 million vehicles annually after a second deck was added. The bridge's final cost was estimated at $60 million. Real-estate speculators believed that the bridge's construction would raise real-estate values in Fort Lee, since the borough's residents would be able to more easily access New York City. During the construction of the George Washington Bridge, speculators spent millions of dollars to buy land around the bridge's New Jersey approach. The bridge was later credited with helping raise land prices and encouraging residential development in formerly agricultural parts of Bergen County. It also spurred the rise of the trucking industry along the United States' East Coast, supplanting much of the freight railroads that used to carry cargo. In the George Washington Bridge's first week of operation, the bridge carried 116,265 vehicles, compared to the Holland Tunnel's 173,010 vehicles, despite the fact that the tunnel had fewer lanes than the bridge did. During that time span, 56,000 pedestrians used the bridge. A week after the bridge opened, the 10-lane tollbooth was expanded to 14 lanes because of heavy weekend traffic volumes. During its first year, the George Washington Bridge saw 5.5 million vehicular crossings and nearly 500,000 pedestrian crossings. Traffic counts on the George Washington Bridge grew year after year. By the time of the bridge's tenth anniversary in 1941, the span had been used by 72 million vehicles total, including a record 9.1 million vehicles in 1940.

On February 22, 1932, George Washington's 200th birthday, the Port Authority planted 70 red oak trees along an approach to the bridge. New Jersey Route 4, which connected directly to the bridge's western end, opened in July 1932. The 178th–179th Street Tunnels, which connected Amsterdam Avenue on the eastern side of Manhattan to the bridge's eastern end on the west side of Manhattan, were supposed to be completed in late 1932. Direct approaches to Riverside Drive and the Hudson River Parkway were completed in 1937, and the tunnels were completed in 1938–1939. A ramp eastward from the bridge and southward to the Harlem River Drive was also completed around this time. The bridge's westbound entrance ramp from Fort Washington Avenue, at the top of the cliff on the Manhattan side, opened in April 1939; another approach in New Jersey had opened by July 1939. The corresponding eastbound exit ramp, as well as the 178th Street Tunnel, opened in June 1940, while the 179th Street Tunnel opened in 1950. In May 1935, a court ruled that the New Jersey and New York governments controlled their respective sides of the bridge.

The bridge was initially lit by 200 lights to provide warning to pilots flying at night. The Port Authority enacted a photography ban during World War II in the 1940s. An aviation obstruction light was installed in 1936 as a memorial to Will Rogers. Additionally, from May 1942 to May 1945, the lights on the bridge were shut off at night as a precautionary measure. After the war ended, the lights were turned back on, but the photography ban was upheld. In August 1946, the bridge's towers were repainted. The underside of the bridge was also repainted in May of the following year.

Originally, the George Washington Bridge's deck consisted of six lanes, with an unpaved center median. In 1946, the median was paved over and two more lanes were created on the upper level, widening it from six lanes to eight lanes. The two center lanes on the upper level served as reversible lanes, which could handle traffic in either direction, depending on which direction had the greater traffic flow.

In November 1950, workers began to tighten the bridge's suspender ropes after almost 20 years of being in place; the project was completed by 1951. New ramps onto the Henry Hudson Parkway were opened in late 1953, followed by the ramps with the Palisades Interstate Parkway in December 1954. In addition, the barrier system on the bridge was adjusted in mid-1954, and new navigational signs were added to assist motorists. In 1955, the lighting system on the deck was replaced.

=== Mid 1950s to mid-1960s: lower level and Approach modernization ===
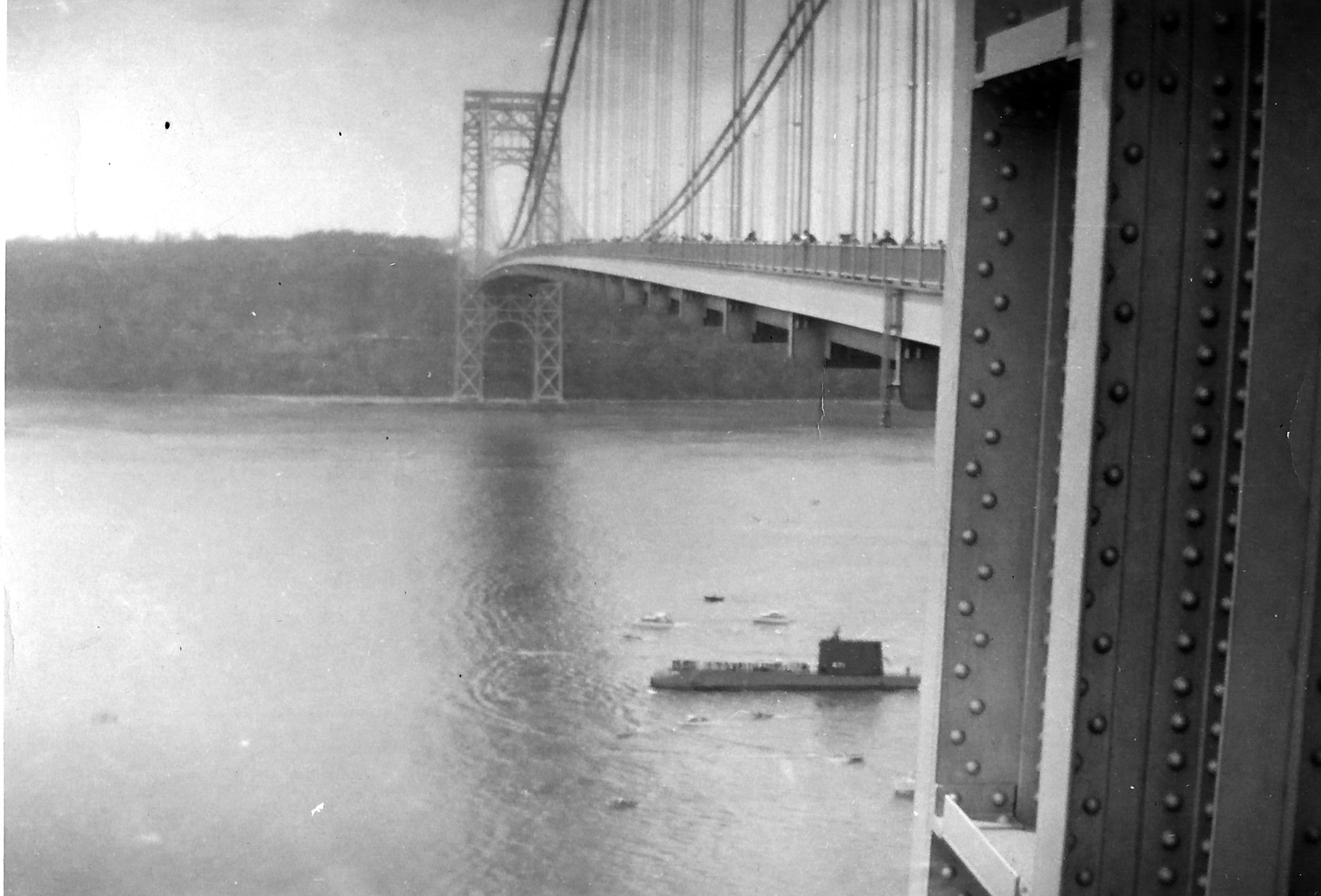
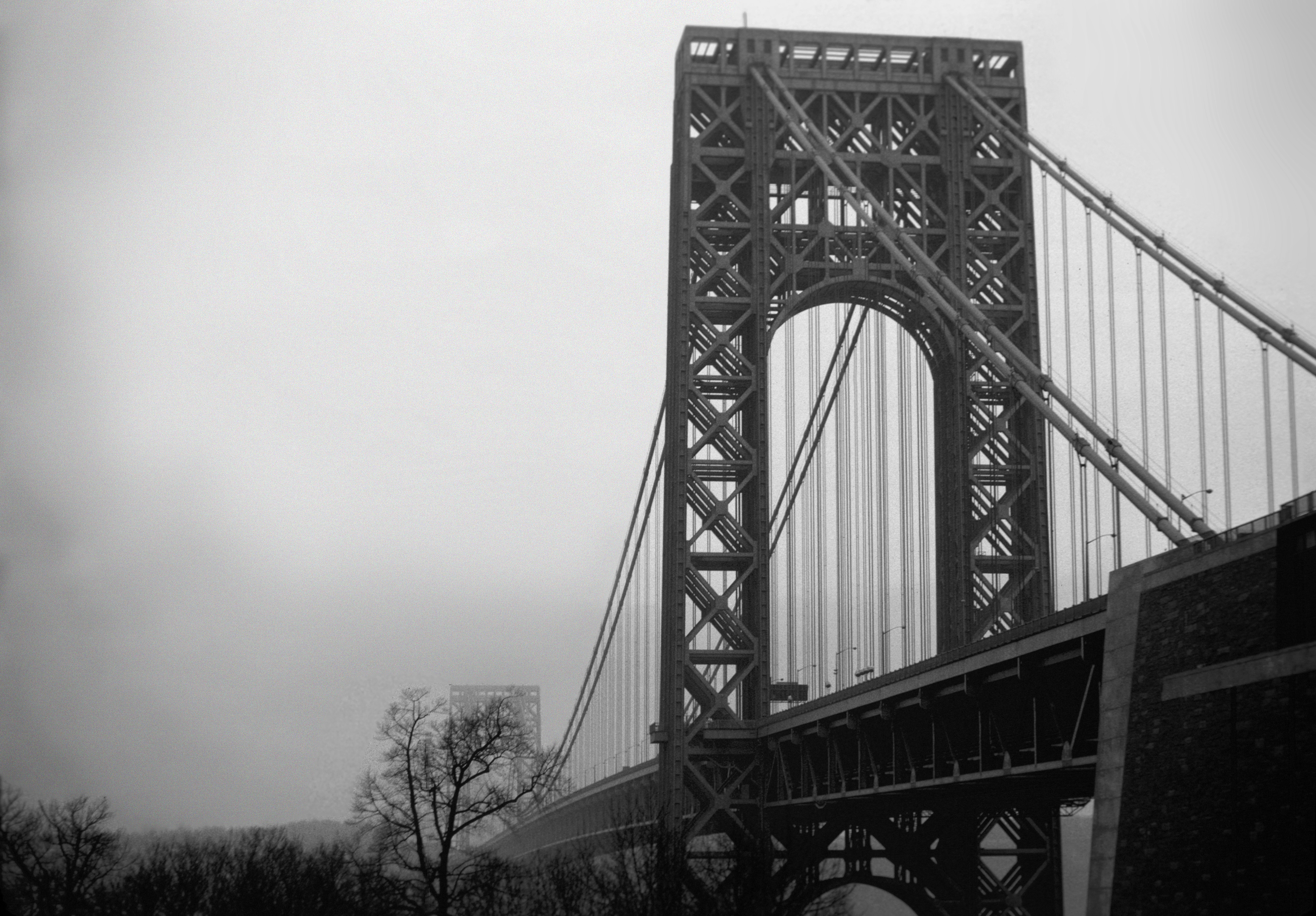
The George Washington Bridge as seen in 1956 (upper) showing the USS Nautilus passing underneath the bridge when it has a single deck, and in 1965 (lower) showing the lower deck more than 2 years after it was opened to traffic.

Construction of the lower deck, as well as the construction of a new bus terminal and other highway connections near the bridge, were recommended in a 1955 study that suggested improvements to the New York City area's highway system. The lower deck was approved by the U.S. Army Corps of Engineers. A Bergen County leader voted against the construction of the lower level in 1956, temporarily delaying construction plans. The New York City Planning Commission approved the George Washington Bridge improvement in June 1957, and the Port Authority allocated funds to the improvement that July. The $183 million project included the construction of the lower deck; the George Washington Bridge Expressway, a 12-lane expressway connecting to the Alexander Hamilton Bridge and the Cross Bronx Expressway (later I-95 and US 9); the George Washington Bridge Bus Station above the expressway; and a series of new ramps to and from the Henry Hudson Parkway. On the New Jersey side, two depressed toll plazas, one in each direction, were to be constructed for lower level traffic. Highway connections were also being built on the New Jersey side, including a direct approach from I-95.

Construction of the approaches started in September 1958. Work on the lower level itself started on June 2, 1959, but work was briefly halted later that year because of a lack of steel. By February 1960, construction was underway on the lower level; the supporting steelwork for the future deck had been completed, and the sections for the lower deck were being installed. The George Washington Bridge's lower deck would comprise 75 steel slabs; each slab weighed 220 tons and measured 108 feet (33 m) wide by 90 feet (27 m) feet long, with a thickness of 30 feet (9.1 m). The construction of the slabs proceeded from either side of the bridge. The right-of-way for the George Washington Bridge Expressway had been almost entirely cleared except for the ventilation buildings for the 178th–179th Street Tunnels. The segments of the lower deck had been laid completely by September 1960, at which point workers started pouring the concrete for the deck's roadway, a process that took five weeks. The layer of concrete measured 4 inches (10 cm) thick. Finally, the deck was paved over with a 2.5-inch (6.4 cm) layer of asphalt.

New ramps to the George Washington Bridge in New Jersey, including from the newly completed I-95, opened in mid-1962. The lower deck was opened to the public on August 29, 1962. The lower level, nicknamed "Martha" after George's wife Martha Washington, increased the capacity of the bridge by 75 percent, and simultaneously made the George Washington Bridge the world's only 14-lane suspension bridge. In addition to providing extra capacity, the lower level served to stiffen the bridge in high winds; before the lower deck was constructed, the George Washington Bridge was known to swing up to 30 inches (76 cm). The George Washington Bridge Bus Station opened on January 17, 1963 and the Alexander Hamilton Bridge opened on January 15, 1963, thus allowing more traffic to use the George Washington Bridge. In the first year after the lower level's opening, the expanded bridge had carried 44 million vehicles. By comparison, 35.86 million vehicles had crossed the bridge in an 11-month period between September 1, 1961 and July 31, 1962. In addition, traffic congestion at the George Washington Bridge was reduced after the lower level opened, and the Port Authority repaired the upper level for the first time in the bridge's history.

=== Mid-1960s to 2000s ===
In preparation for the 1964 New York World's Fair, the addition of lighting on the bridge's suspender ropes was completed in April of that year. A fixed median was added to the upper level in 1970; the concrete barrier was destroyed to allow for such. In 1976, the bridge's towers were equipped with new mechanics towers to hoist up an American flag automatically, This saved money, increased safety, and reduced congestion, as traffic previously had to stop when this happened.

Deterioration of the upper deck had become noticeable by the late 1950s. By 1970, 25% of it had become filled with potholes. Because of this, in 1977, the Port Authority began a project to replace the deck. The original was removed, and the new deck, which was constructed in prefabricated sections, was placed over it. As part of the project, the upper level was restricted to four lanes; the upper-level lanes carried two-way traffic during off-peak hours. The PANYNJ encouraged traffic to use the lower level due to this. It was completed in October 1978, a few weeks ahead of schedule. It was one the first orthotropic deck replacements in the United States.

The first-ever complete closure of the George Washington Bridge occurred on August 6, 1980, when a truck carrying highly flammable propane gas across the bridge started to leak. As a safety precaution in case the fuel started to ignite, traffic across the bridge was halted for several hours, and 2,000 people living near the bridge were evacuated. Since the George Washington Bridge is the primary crossing between New Jersey and New York City, the closure caused traffic jams that stretched for up to 30 miles (48 km), and the effects of this congestion could be seen more than 45 miles (72 km) away. Two police officers eventually plugged the leak with an inexpensive device. Up to that point, trucks carrying flammable material had been allowed to use the George Washington Bridge. After the incident, New York City officials conducted a study on whether to prohibit hazardous cargo from traveling through the city. As a direct result, any truck carrying flammable gas were banned from the lower level.

The bridge was carrying 82.8 million vehicles per year by 1980. The American Society of Civil Engineers named the bridge as a National Historic Civil Engineering Landmark on October 24, 1981, the 50th anniversary of the bridge. The 50th anniversary was also marked with a parade of automobiles. At that point, 1.8 billion vehicles had used the bridge throughout its lifetime. A temporary water pipeline was installed on the bridge during a drought; it was ultimately retained. The north sidewalk was rebuilt from November 1983 to late 1985, and the south sidewalk was also reconstructed from February 1984 to early 1986. The project cost $9 million.

Rehabilitation of the upper level's expansion joints took place in 1988, and a rehabilitation of the lower level was announced two years later. The supporting structural steel between the two decks were replaced, and some ramps onto the lower level were rebuilt. The ramps on the New York side, connecting with Riverside Drive and the Henry Hudson Parkway, were reconstructed for $27.6 million after studies in the late 1980s showed deterioration on these ramps. Although the Port Authority had announced the repairs in advance, the start of roadwork in September 1990 caused extensive traffic jams. The upper level was repaved in 1995, an inspection in 1997 found that 440 vertical suspender ropes at the New York anchorage had corroded, so these were replaced.

=== 2000s to present ===
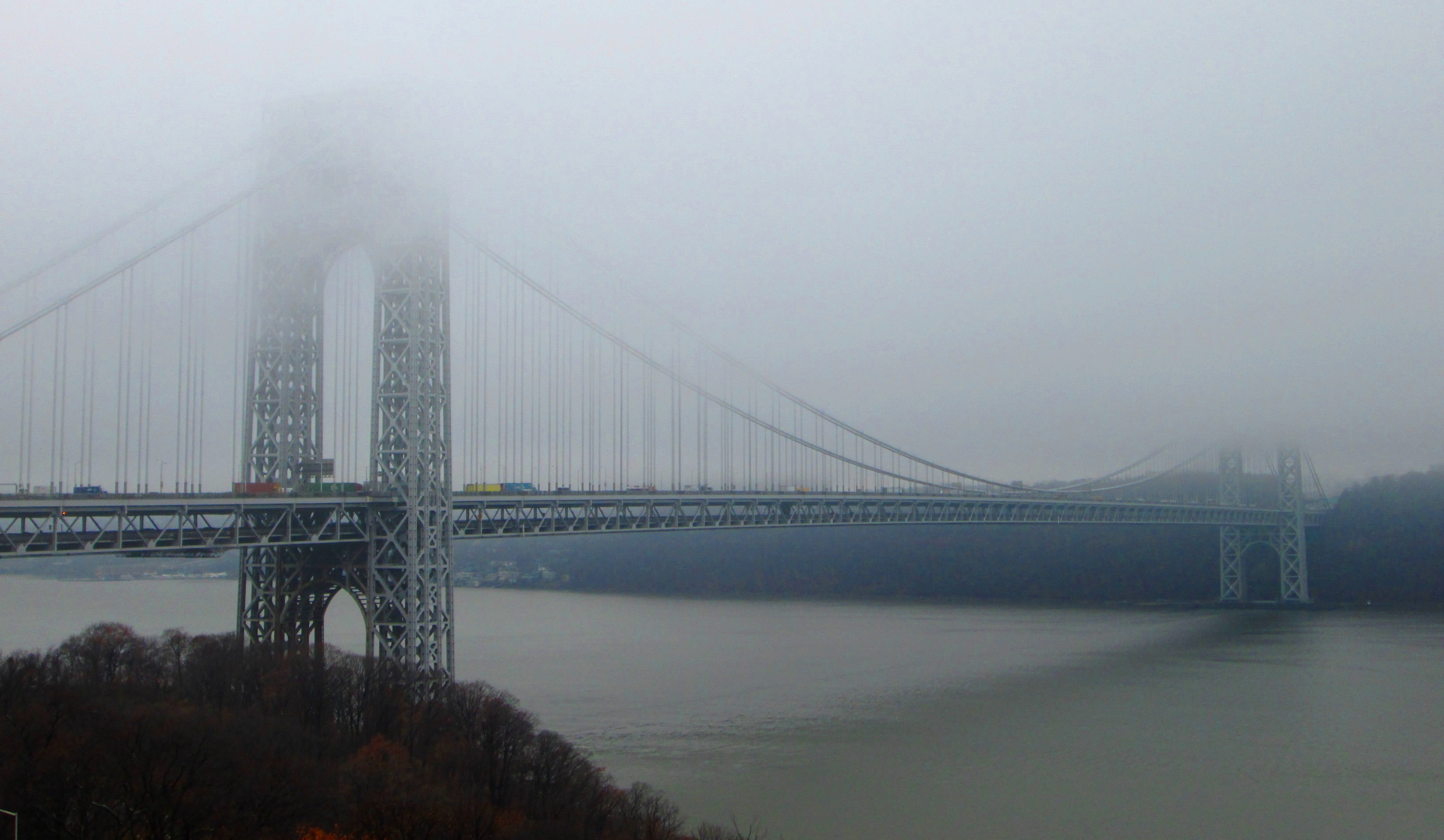
George Washington Bridge seen from Castle Village, shrouded in winter fog in December 2013

Workers started rehabilitating about 5 miles (8.0 km) of approach ramps in 1999; the project was finished in May 2001 and cost $38 million. The Port Authority also proposed a ramp from the lower level to the Palisades Interstate Parkway on the New Jersey side in 2000. The ramp would have cost $86.5 million and would have been completed in 2003 or 2004, but the connection was ultimately not built. Starting on July 4, 2000, and for subsequent special occasions, each of the George Washington Bridge's suspension towers has been illuminated by 380 light fixtures that highlight the exposed steel structure. On each tower are a mix of 150 and 1000 watt metal halide lamp fixtures. The architectural lighting design was completed by Domingo Gonzalez Associates.

The northern sidewalk was closed after the September 11 attacks because of security concerns. In addition, trucks were banned from the lower level to avoid severe damage from a potential car bombing. In 2002, the Port Authority began to repaint the towers and the underside of the upper deck. The old lead-based paint was replaced with lead-free paint. The $62 million project was completed in September 2006, in advance of the bridge's 75th anniversary. In September 2007, the Port Authority announced that the suspender lighting was to be replaced by new energy-efficient diodes. This project was completed in 2009.

Following 15 reported suicides and 68 failed suicides in 2017, the Port Authority installed protective netting and an 11-foot-high (3.4 m) fence along each upper level sidewalk. The netting partially overhangs the sidewalks in order to prevent potential jumpers from scaling the fence directly. The southern sidewalk was closed from September to December 2017 so that a temporary fence could be installed there. Once the temporary fence had been erected, the permanent 11-foot-high barrier was constructed on the northern sidewalk, followed by the permanent barrier on the southern sidewalk.

==== 2010s and 2020s renovation ====
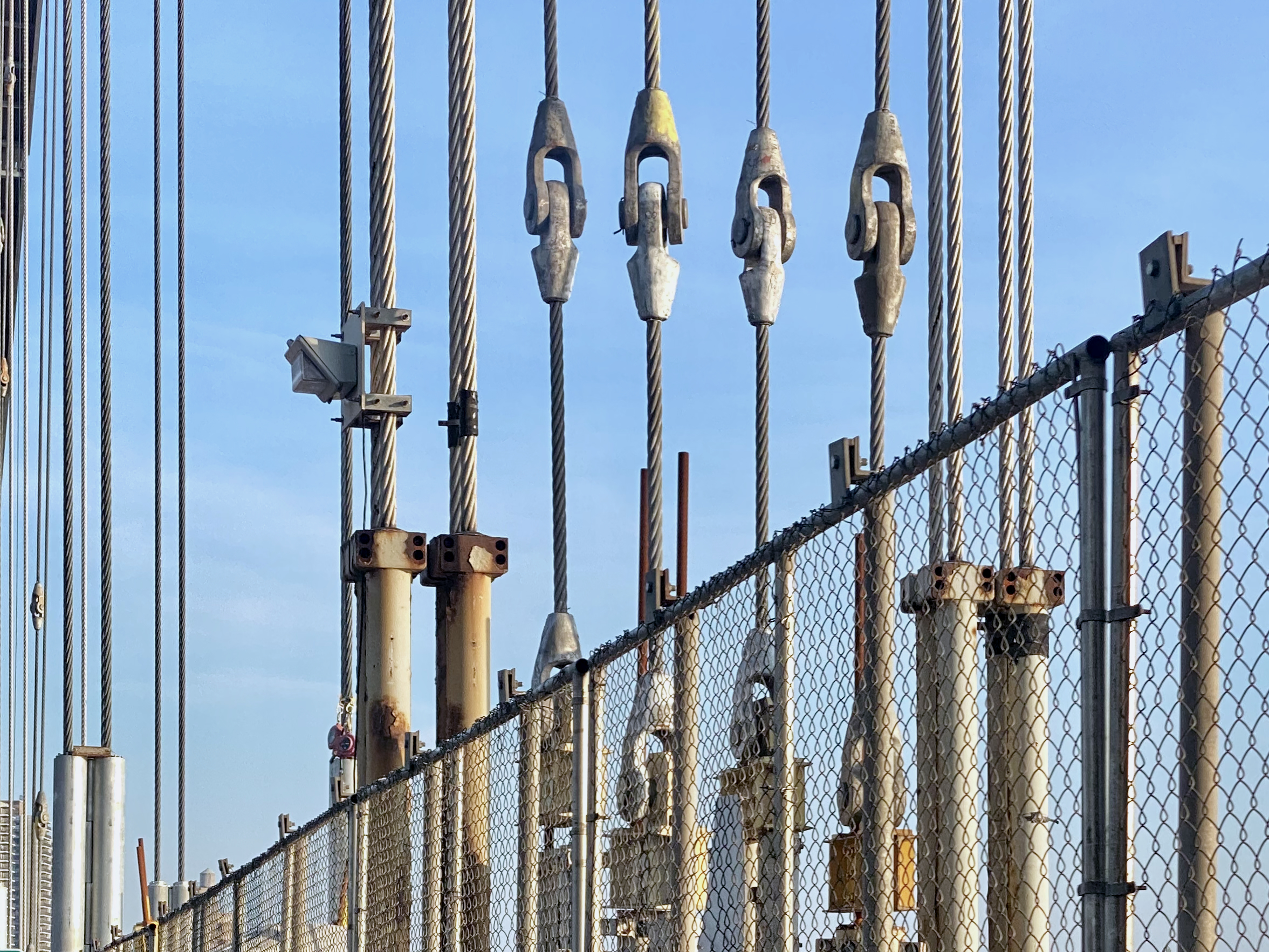
Original suspender ropes being replaced, compared to new ones on the far left

In December 2011, the Port Authority announced plans to extensively rehabilitate the bridge. The vertical suspender ropes would be replaced, at an expected cost of more than $1 billion paid for by toll revenue. In August 2013, repair crews began an $82 million effort to fix cracks in the upper deck's structural steel. Work restarted in June 2014 after a pause lasting several months. The Port Authority also started a $2 billion project to renovate or replace bridge components. The lower level was repaved in 2016, and repainting work and maintenance platform replacement on the lower deck was completed in 2017. The bridge's 592 vertical suspender ropes were then replaced to fix damage caused by excessive heat and humidity. The staircases leading to the sidewalks on both the northern and southern sides of the upper deck were also being replaced with ramps that were compliant with the Americans with Disabilities Act of 1990. The Trans-Manhattan Expressway was being renovated in conjunction with this project. On the New Jersey side, the Palisades Interstate Parkway "Helix" ramp onto the bridge would be replaced at a cost of $112.6 million; this was completed in March 2019.

The northern sidewalk reopened in early 2023, after the suspender ropes on that side had been replaced. By early 2024, the restoration project was half complete, and workers were restoring the southern sidewalk and its cables. The same year, the Port Authority awarded $455 million in contracts for structural steel replacement. The suspender cable replacements were almost finished by December 2024, and all of the 592 suspender cables had been replaced by March 2025. The National Transportation Safety Board also recommended in early 2025 that the bridge undergo a structural vulnerability assessment, following the Francis Scott Key Bridge collapse in Maryland the previous year. Workers also installed new LED lights on the bridge, which were illuminated every night from June 2026 onward.

== Road connections ==
=== New Jersey ===
The George Washington Bridge carries I-95 and US 1/9 between New Jersey and New York. Coming from New Jersey, US 46 terminates at the state border in the middle of the bridge. Further west, I-80, US 9W, New Jersey Route 4, and the New Jersey Turnpike also feed into the bridge via either I-95, U.S. 1/9, or U.S. 46 but end before reaching it. I-80 also gives drivers from the Garden State Parkway and Route 17 access to the bridge, and access to them as seen by signage on I-95 south. The Palisades Interstate Parkway connects directly to the bridge's upper level, though not to the lower level; however, a ramp to link the Interstate Parkway to the lower level was proposed in 2000. The marginal roads and local streets above the highways are known as GWB Plaza. The bridge's toll plaza, which collects tolls from eastbound/northbound traffic only, is located on the New Jersey side.

=== New York ===
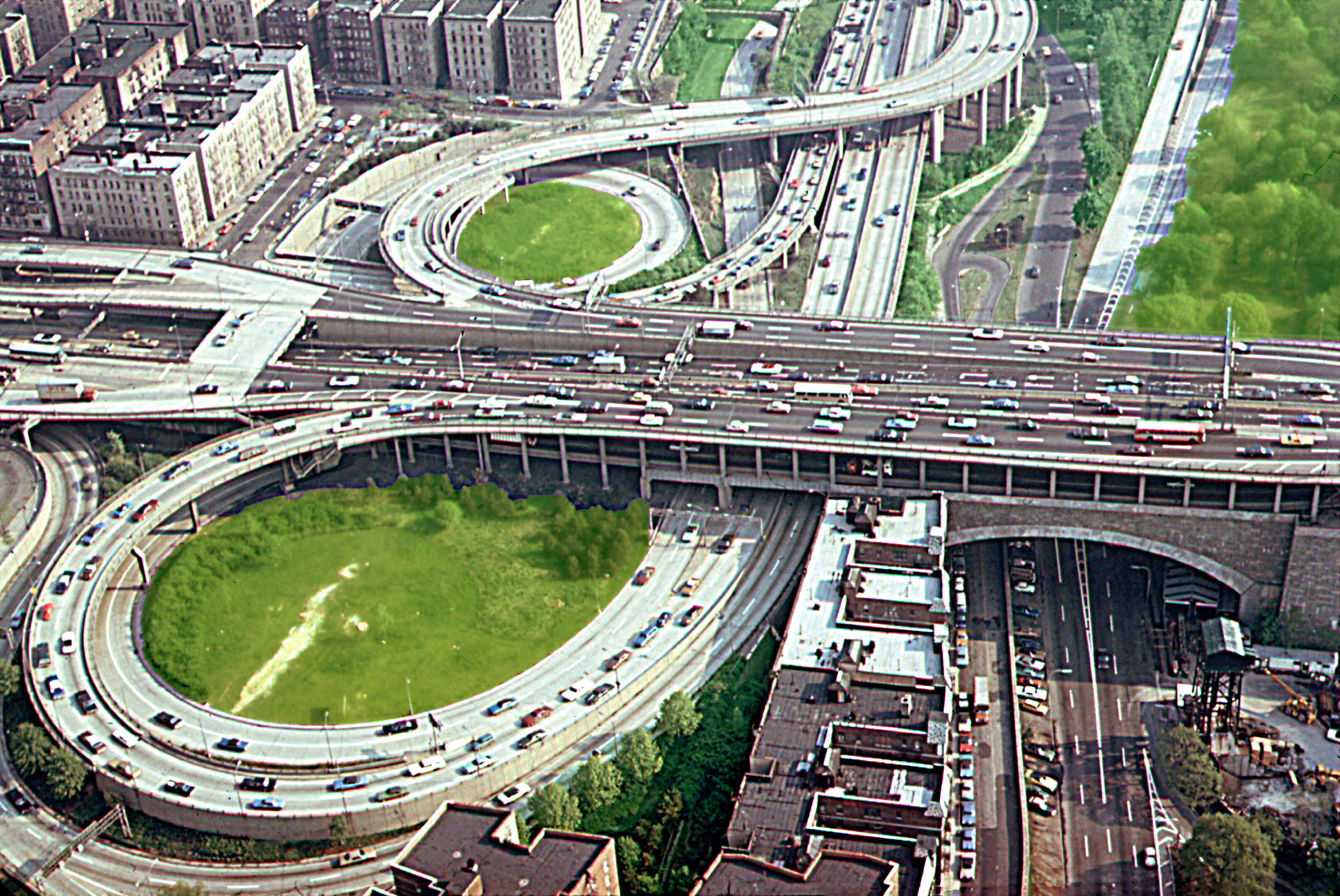
Ramps on the New York side, seen in 1973

On the New York side, the 12-lane Trans-Manhattan Expressway heads east across the narrow neck of Upper Manhattan, from the bridge to the Harlem River. It provides access from both decks to 178th and 179th Streets, which cross Manhattan horizontally, where U.S. 9 leaves the expressway and follows Broadway; the Henry Hudson Parkway and Riverside Drive, on the Hudson River's eastern bank along the west side of Manhattan; and to Amsterdam Avenue and the Harlem River Drive, on the Harlem River's western bank on the east side. The expressway connects directly with the Alexander Hamilton Bridge, which spans the Harlem River as part of the Cross-Bronx Expressway (I-95), providing access to the Major Deegan Expressway (I-87). Heading towards New Jersey, local access to the bridge is available from 179th Street. There are also ramps connecting the bridge to the George Washington Bridge Bus Terminal, a commuter bus terminal with direct access to the New York City Subway at the 175th Street station on the IND Eighth Avenue Line (served by the A train).

Originally, the approach to the George Washington Bridge from the New York side consisted of a roundabout encircling a fountain, which was designed by Cass Gilbert. This plan was deemed not feasible as a result of the congestion that the weaving movements would create. The final plans called for meandering roadways from Riverside Drive and Henry Hudson Parkway, which run along the eastern bank of the Hudson River at the bottom of the cliff in Washington Heights. The Henry Hudson Parkway actually passes under the New York side's anchorage using an underpass designed by Gilbert. The connection to the 178th–179th Street Tunnels, which connected to the southbound Harlem River Drive, opened in 1940. The tunnels were replaced by the Trans-Manhattan Expressway, which opened in 1962. The tunnels and expressway were built to minimize disruption to the Washington Heights neighborhood, which had already been developed at the time.

=== Alternate routes ===
Further south along the Hudson River, the Lincoln Tunnel (Route 495) and Holland Tunnel (Interstate 78/Route 139) also enter Manhattan. Both tunnels are operated by the Port Authority, which collects tolls from drivers crossing the Hudson River eastbound toward New York City. The Verrazzano–Narrows Bridge (I-278), connecting the New York City boroughs of Staten Island and Brooklyn, is the southernmost alternate route. It connects to the Bayonne Bridge, Goethals Bridge, and Outerbridge Crossing between Staten Island and New Jersey. All four bridges to Staten Island collect tolls for drivers driving into the island. (Note: MTA Bridges and Tunnels collects tolls for the Verrazzano–Narrows Bridge while the Port Authority collects tolls for the other three bridges to Staten Island.)

Farther north within the New York metropolitan area, the Tappan Zee Bridge (Interstates 87/287 and New York State Thruway) avoids the congested Cross Bronx Expressway and the city proper. Thruway traffic sometimes uses the George Washington Bridge as a detour, since no roads cross the Hudson River between the George Washington and Tappan Zee bridges. The Tappan Zee Bridge also charges tolls for eastbound drivers. Even farther north is the Bear Mountain Bridge, carrying U.S. 6 and U.S. 202, about 20 miles (32 km) north of the Tappan Zee Bridge; it also charges tolls for eastbound drivers.

== Tolls ==
As of January 4, 2026, the toll going from New Jersey to New York City is $23.30 for cars and motorcycles with toll-by-plate or E-ZPasses issued by agencies outside of New York and New Jersey. New Jersey and New York–issued E-ZPass users are charged $14.79 for cars and $13.79 for motorcycles during off-peak hours, and $16.79 for cars and $15.79 for motorcycles during peak hours. E-ZPass Mid-Tier users are charged $19.55 for cars and $19.05 for motorcycles. There is no toll for passenger vehicles going from New York City to New Jersey.

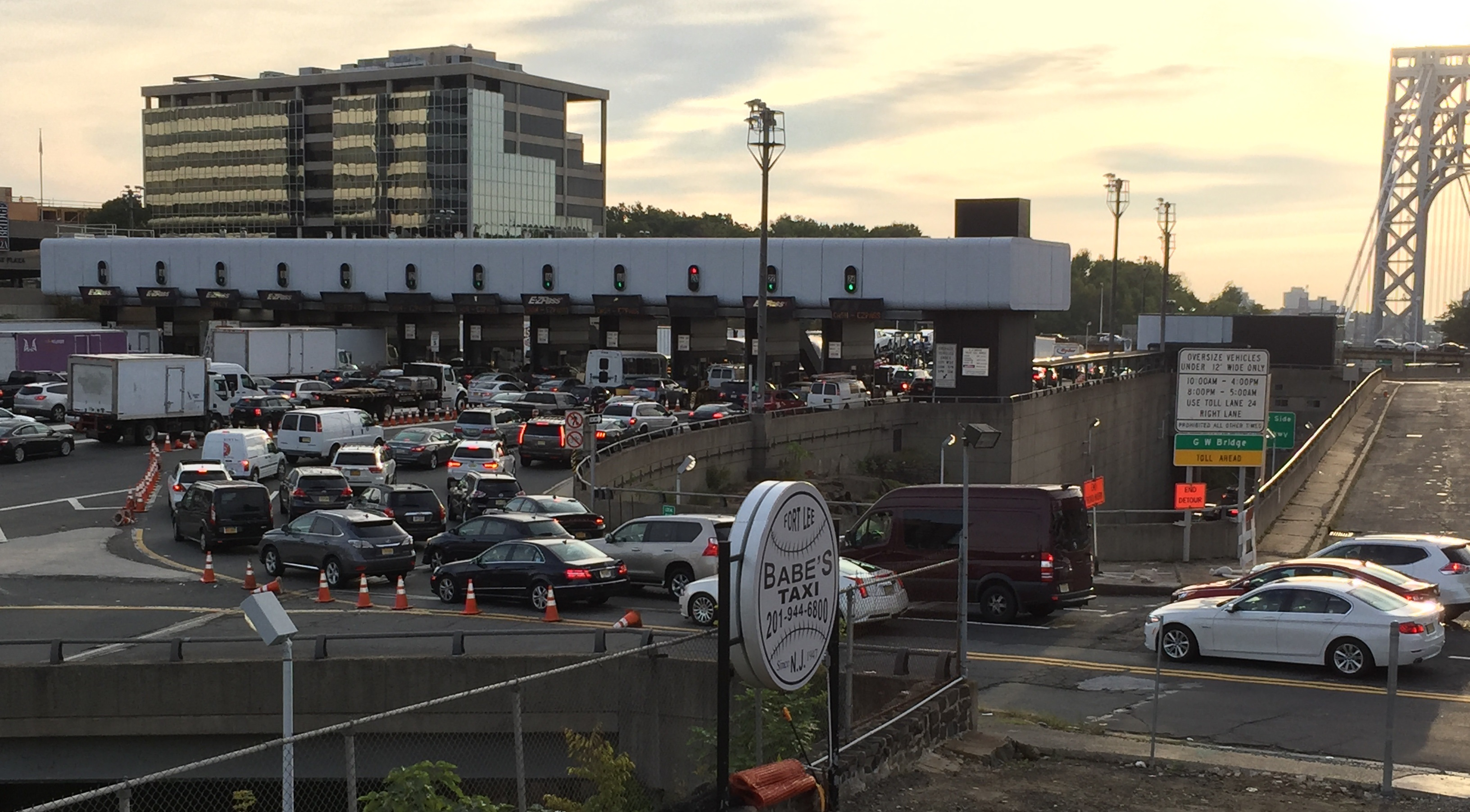
The upper-level toll plaza with heavy traffic congestion

Originally, tolls were collected in both directions. The original toll booth on the New Jersey side was designed by Gilbert, who also designed a classical-style maintenance booth, neither of which is extant. In August 1970, the toll was abolished for westbound drivers, and at the same time, eastbound drivers saw their tolls doubled. The tolls of eleven other New York–New Jersey and Hudson River crossings along a 130-mile (210 km) stretch, from the Outerbridge Crossing in the south to the Rip Van Winkle Bridge in the north, were also changed to south- or eastbound-only at that time. There were a series of tollbooths on the New Jersey side. The bridge had 29 toll lanes: 12 in the main upper-level toll plaza, 10 in the lower-level toll plaza, and seven in the Palisades Interstate Parkway toll plaza leading to the upper level.

Starting in July 1997, E-ZPass was accepted for toll payment on the George Washington Bridge. In 2000, the Port Authority proposed removing the tollbooths for the E-ZPass lanes on the lower level and Palisades Parkway toll plazas, replacing them with electronic toll collection gantries to allow motorists to maintain highway speeds. The Palisades Parkway toll plaza began operating overnight in April 2001, though only E-ZPass users could use the toll plaza from 11 p.m. to 5 a.m. on weekdays and from 11 p.m. to 7 a.m. on weekends.

Open road tolling was implemented for drivers going from Palisades Interstate Parkway in February 2020. In March 2020, due to the COVID-19 pandemic, all-electronic tolling was temporarily placed in effect for all Port Authority crossings, including the George Washington Bridge. Open road tolling was also implemented on the lower level in November 2020. Cash toll collection was temporarily reinstated on the upper level only from October 2020 to July 2022 while the required open road tolling infrastructure was being installed. The carpool discount was eliminated when open-road tolling commenced on the upper level in July 2022. The toll plazas were demolished over two years starting in March 2023, and replaced by overhead gantries on the New Jersey approaches to the bridge. A vehicle without E-ZPass has a picture taken of its license plate and a bill for the toll mailed to its owner. For E-ZPass users, sensors detect their transponders wirelessly.

Pedestrians and cyclists may cross free of charge on the south sidewalk. Pedestrians traveling in either direction originally paid tolls of 10 cents when the bridge opened. The pedestrian toll was reduced to 5 cents in 1935 and discontinued altogether in 1940.

=== Historical toll rates ===
Historical tolls for the George Washington Bridge (Note: This table lists the peak tolls for two-axle vehicles. Motorcycle tolls and off-peak tolls are lower, and tolls for vehicles with additional axles are higher.)
Years	Toll		Toll equivalent in 2025		Direction collected	Ref.
Years	Cash	E-ZPass	Cash	E-ZPass		
1931–1970	$0.50	—N/a	$10.59–4.15	—N/a	each direction	
1970–1975	$1.00	—N/a	$8.29–5.98	—N/a	eastbound only	
1975–1983	$1.50	—N/a	$8.97–5.86	—N/a	eastbound only	
1983–1987	$2.00	—N/a	$7.82–5.67	—N/a	eastbound only	
1987–1991	$3.00	—N/a	$8.50–7.09	—N/a	eastbound only	
1991–2001	$4.00	$4.00	$9.46–7.27	$9.46–7.27	eastbound only	
2001–2008	$6.00	$5.00	$10.91–8.97	$9.09–7.48	eastbound only	
2008–2011	$8.00	$8.00	$11.96–11.45	$11.96–11.45	eastbound only	
2011–2012	$12.00	$9.50	$17.17–16.83	$13.60–13.32	eastbound only	
2012–2014	$13.00	$10.25	$18.23–17.68	$14.37–13.94	eastbound only	
2014–2015	$14.00	$11.75	$19.04–19.02	$16.82–15.96	eastbound only	
2015–2020	$15.00	$12.50	$20.37–18.66	$16.77–15.55	eastbound only	
2020–2023	$16.00	$13.75	$19.90–17.60	$17.11–14.53	eastbound only	
2023–2024	$17.00	$14.75	$17.96–17.45	$15.59–15.14	eastbound only	
2024–2025	$17.63	$15.38	$17.63	$15.38	eastbound only	
January–July 2025	$18.31	$16.06	$18.31	$16.06	eastbound only	
July 2025 – January 2026	$22.38	$16.06	$22.38	$16.06	eastbound only	
Since January 2026	$23.30	$16.79	$23.30	$16.79	eastbound only	

Prior to July 10, 2022, a discounted carpool toll ($7.75) was available at all times for cars with three or more passengers using a NY or NJ E-ZPass, who proceeded through a staffed toll lane, provided they were registered with the free "Carpool Plan", except if entering from the Palisades Interstate Parkway entrance to the bridge. The Carpool Plan ended when the George Washington Bridge implemented cashless tolling.

== Non-motorized access ==
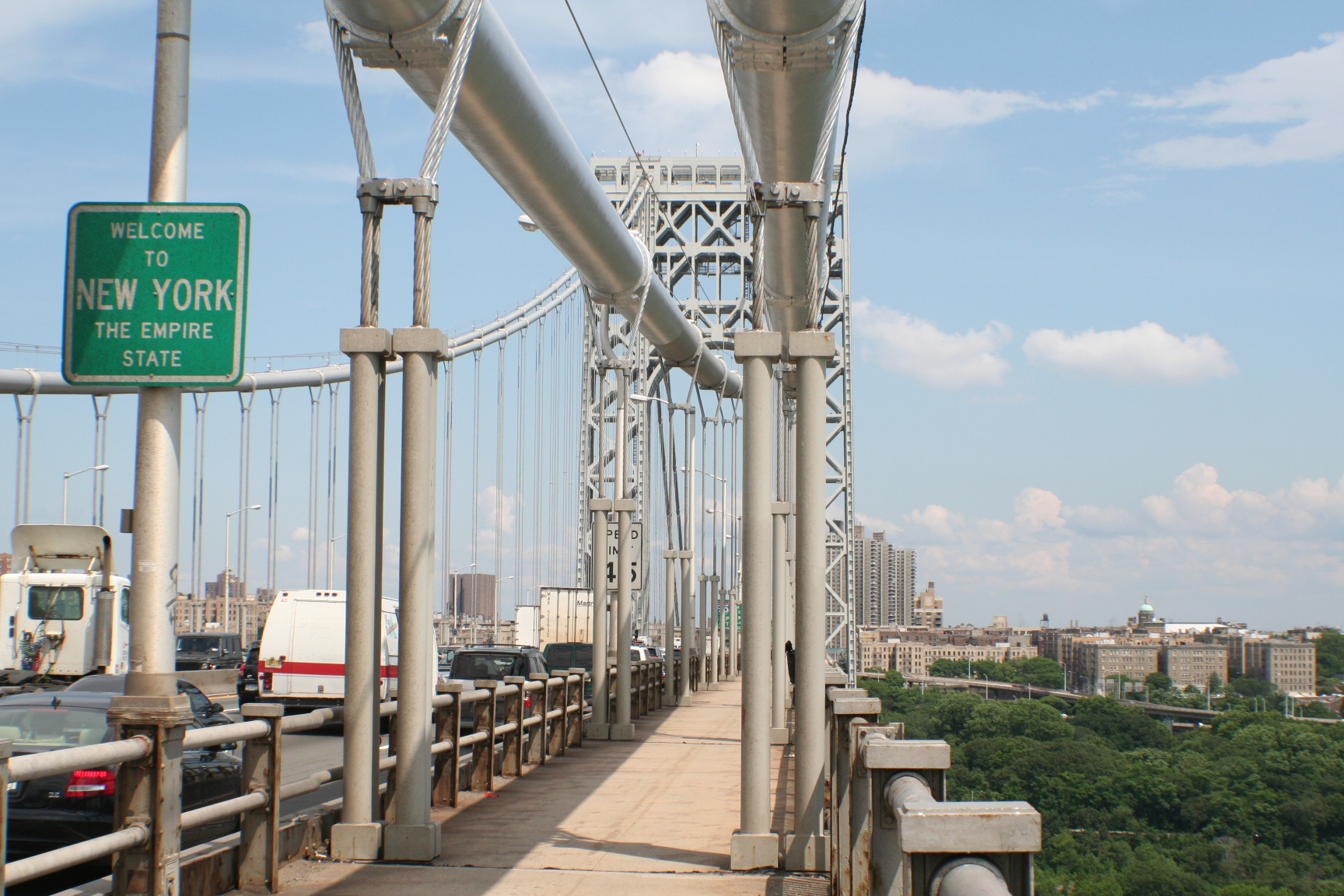
The Southern sidewalk

The George Washington Bridge contains two sidewalks that can be used by pedestrians and bicyclists. The southern sidewalk, accessible by a long, steep ramp on the Manhattan side of the bridge is shared by cyclists and pedestrians. The entrance in Manhattan is at 178th Street, just west of Cabrini Boulevard, and also has access to the Hudson River Greenway north of the bridge. Both sidewalks are accessible on the New Jersey side from Hudson Terrace.

The George Washington Bridge carries New York State Bicycle Route 9, a bike route that runs from New York City north to Rouses Point. As of October 2024, the bike lanes are open from 5 a.m. to midnight every day.

The Port Authority closed the northern sidewalk at all times in 2001. Though it offers direct access into Palisades Interstate Park, the northern sidewalk requires stairway climbs and descents on both sides, which was inaccessible for people with physical disabilities and posed a risk in poor weather conditions. Advocacy groups such as Transportation Alternatives also suggested improvements.

As part of the project to replace the bridge's vertical support cables, the connections to both sidewalks will be enhanced or rebuilt and made ADA-compliant. While the south-side cables are being replaced, that sidewalk will be closed and the north sidewalk will be open. Once the entire project is completed in 2027, pedestrians will use the south sidewalk and cyclists will use the north sidewalk. The sidewalk aspect of the project is expected to cost $118 million.

== Incidents ==
=== Suicides and deaths ===
The George Washington Bridge is among the most frequently chosen sites in the New York metropolitan area for suicide by jumping or falling off the bridge. The first death by jumping was unintentional and occurred before the bridge opened. On September 21, 1930, a stunt jumper named Norman J. Terry jumped off the bridge's deck in front of a crowd of thousands, and because his body was facing the wrong way, he broke his neck upon hitting the water. The first intentional suicide occurred on November 3, 1931, a little more than one week after the bridge opened.

Several suicide attempts off the George Washington Bridge have been widely publicized. In 1994, a person going by the name "Prince" called The Howard Stern Show while on the bridge, said he would kill himself, but Howard Stern talked him out of it. The 2010 suicide of Tyler Clementi, who had jumped from the bridge, drew national attention to cyberbullying and the struggles facing LGBT youth.

In 2012, a record 18 people threw themselves off the bridge to their deaths, while 43 others attempted to do so but survived. There were 18 deaths reported in both 2014 and 2015. In 2014, 74 people were stopped by the Port Authority police, while the next year, another 86 people were stopped by the Port Authority police. In 2016, there were 12 reported deaths, a decrease from previous years, while 70 people were stopped by the Port Authority police. In 2017, the Port Authority proposed equipping a two-person Emergency Services Unit team with harnesses to prevent suicides from the bridge.

=== Controversies and protests ===
On September 9, 2013, dedicated toll lanes for one of the local Fort Lee entrances to the bridge's upper level were reduced from three to one, with the two other lanes diverted to highway traffic. The closures were made without notification to local government officials and emergency responders. The local toll lane reductions caused massive traffic congestion, with major delays for school transportation and police and emergency service responses within Fort Lee. The lanes were reopened by the Port Authority on September 13. After a four-month investigation, it was revealed that the lane closures were made by the aides and appointees of New Jersey Governor Chris Christie, causing a political scandal. The repercussions and controversy surrounding these actions have been investigated by the Port Authority, federal prosecutors, and a New Jersey legislature committee.

On September 12, 2020, a hundred anti-police brutality protesters from the Black Lives Matter movement converged from both New York and New Jersey, blocking the upper level of the bridge for about an hour before walking to the New York City Police Department's 34th Precinct in Manhattan.

=== Other incidents ===
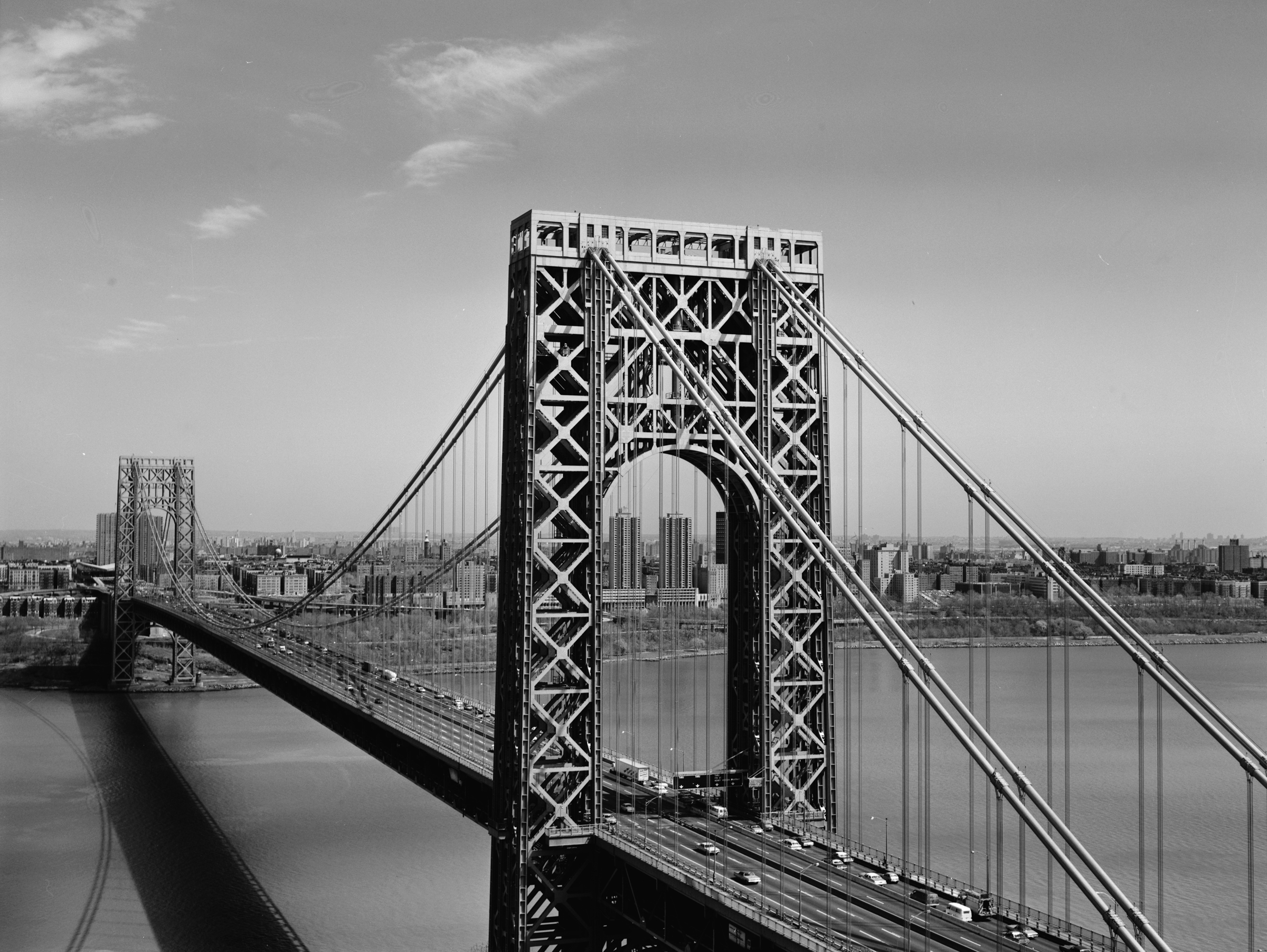
The bridge as seen in 1978

On December 28, 1966, a 19-year-old pilot made an emergency landing on the bridge's New Jersey side after his plane's engine failed. There were no deaths reported, because there was very little traffic at the time, but the pilot and his passenger were injured. At the time, there was no median barrier on the bridge's upper deck.

In June 1977, two tractor-trailers nearly fell off the lower level after jackknifing, then going through both the roadway barrier and a mesh net next to the roadway. One of the drivers was hurt slightly, while the other driver was not hurt. The accident also involved a third tractor-trailer and two passenger cars, none of whose occupants were hurt. Accidents involving trucks dumping their cargo have also occurred on the George Washington Bridge. Watermelons, frozen chicken parts, and horse manure have all fallen onto the bridge's roadway at some point.

During the terrorist attacks on September 11, 2001, several news organizations, including CNN, reported that a vehicle filled with explosives had been found on the lower level of the bridge. However, several investigations found no evidence of a vehicle containing explosives on the bridge.

== In popular culture ==
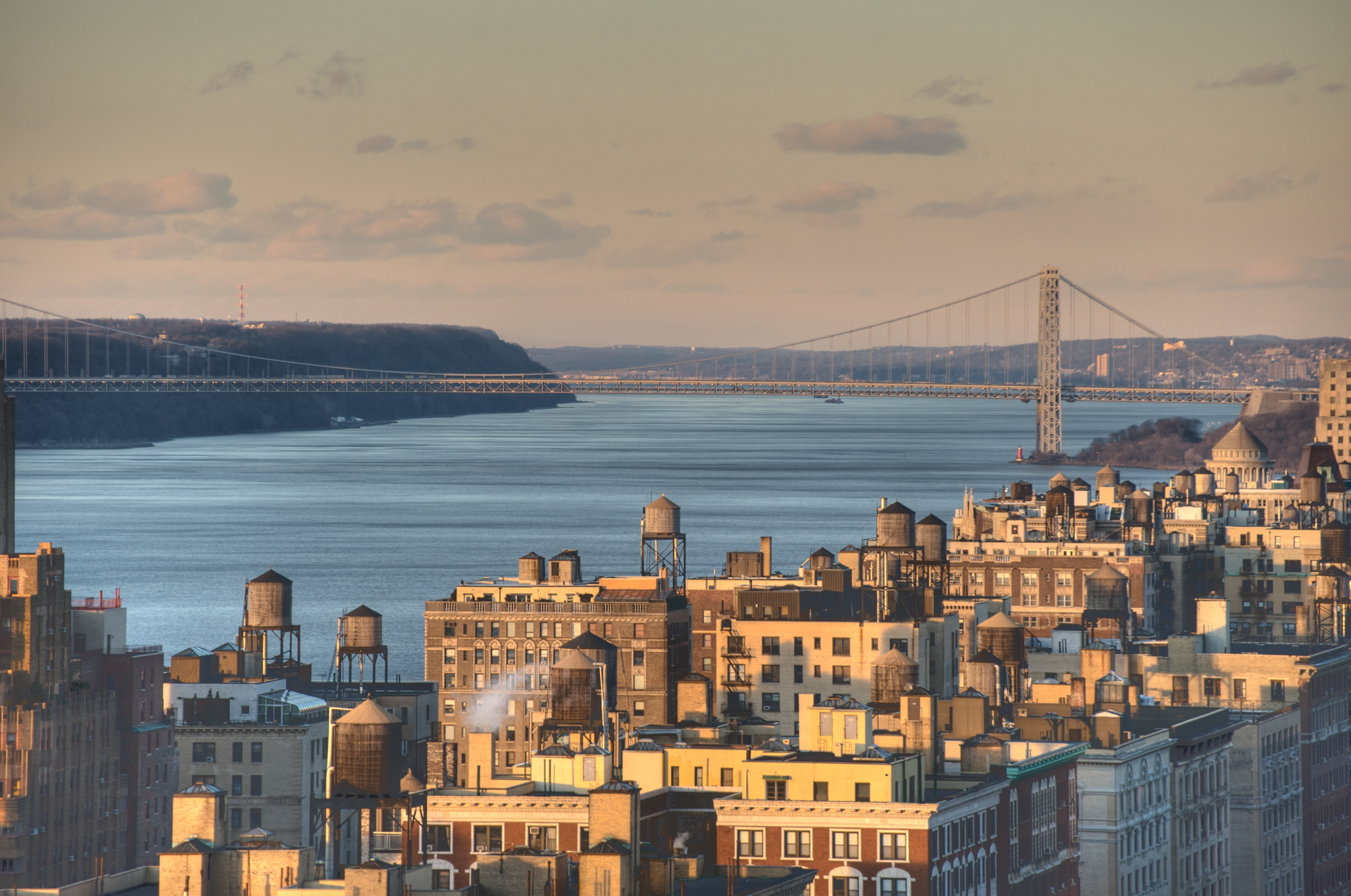
Morningside Heights with the George Washington Bridge visible in the background

The bridge is seen in a number of movies set in New York:

- Ball of Fire (1941) was the first film to show the bridge.
- In Force of Evil (1948), Leo Morse is buried under the bridge by the mob of gangsters employing his brother Joe.
- In How to Marry a Millionaire (1953), Loco and Brewster are fêted as being in the 50 millionth car to cross the bridge as part of the "George Washington Bridge Week" festivities.
- In Network (1976), Schumacher tells a story in which, having overslept for a news shoot about the bridge's new lower deck, he gets into a cab wearing a raincoat over his pajamas and tells the driver to take him to the middle of the bridge. The taxi driver, concerned that Schumacher intends to jump, begs him: "Don't do it buddy! You're a young man!"
- Sully (2016) reenacts how Sullenberger overflew the bridge by a few hundred feet.
- In 24: Legacy (2017), the bridge is destroyed as part of a terrorist attack.
- The bridge was also shown in The Godfather (1972), and Cop Land (1997).

The bridge has been featured in music. William Schuman's 1950 composition George Washington Bridge is about the bridge. In the opening of Sesame Street Sing-Along!, Ernie sang the words "George Washington Bridge" to the tune of Sobre las Olas ("The Loveliest Night of the Year"). In addition, Nina Rosario sings "Just me and the GWB asking, 'Gee, Nina, what'll you be?'" in "Breathe" from In the Heights.

In visual art, the first issue of the comic Atomic War! published in November 1952, the George Washington Bridge is shown collapsing during a bombing of New York City. Additionally, painters George Ault and Valeri Larko have both created artworks named after the bridge. Video games such as Metal Gear Solid 2: Sons of Liberty also showed the George Washington Bridge. In Faith Ringgold's children's picture book Tar Beach, the bridge is depicted prominently, and the narrator feels a connection to it as she looks at it from her rooftop in Harlem.

The construction of the bridge is detailed in George Washington Bridge: A Timeless Marvel and George Washington Bridge: Poetry in Steel. The bridge and the nearby Little Red Lighthouse are the subjects of Hildegarde Swift's 1942 children's book The Little Red Lighthouse and the Great Gray Bridge.

== See also ==
- List of bridges documented by the Historic American Engineering Record in New Jersey
- List of bridges documented by the Historic American Engineering Record in New York
- List of fixed crossings of the Hudson River
