= The American People Series 20: Die =

Painting by Faith Ringgold

The American People Series #20: Die
- Die in 2024 at the Museum of Modern Art
- Artist: Faith Ringgold
- Year: 1967
- Catalogue: 199915
- Medium: Oil on canvas
- Dimensions: 182.9 cm × 365.8 cm (72 in × 144 in)
- Location: Museum of Modern Art, New York
- Accession: 212.2016.a-b

The American People Series #20: Die is an oil on canvas painting made by American artist Faith Ringgold in 1967. Inspired by Pablo Picasso's painting Guernica (1937) and painted amidst the riots and uprisings of the 1960s, Die is a two-panel work depicting a group of black and white men, women, and children, most of whom are wounded or covered in blood, variously fighting, fleeing, or dying against an abstract grey background. The piece has been extensively cited as among Ringgold's most important and iconic artworks.

== Description ==
Die is composed of oil paint on two canvas panels. The painting depicts a group of ten adults and three children in different poses of violence and fear. Starting from the left of the painting, there is a black man whose lower half and left arm are visible; a crying biracial black girl being held from the head by a white woman and reaching toward the first man; a black man strangling a white man who is splayed out; a white woman standing over a seemingly dead white man on the ground and reaching to the right of the painting; a black girl and white boy embracing in fear; a seemingly dead black man; a black woman reaching toward the left of the painting; a white man pointing a gun toward the second white woman; and a black man holding a bloody knife at the far right of the painting. Every figure apart from the two embracing children is either wounded or splattered with blood, and each figure is grimacing in fear or anger. The figures are all wearing formal attire; the men wear dress pants and white collared shirts, and the women wear orange cocktail dresses. The embracing children wear outfits matching the adults, and the child being held aloft wears a white dress. Behind the figures is a grid made up of varying shades of grey.

== History ==
Die was painted during the riots and uprisings of the 1960s and following the 1965 assassination of Malcolm X, and was finished the year before the assassination of Martin Luther King Jr. and the riots that followed. As the final work in The American People Series, Die represents the endpoint of the series' tonal shift from optimism to violence as the early successes of the Civil Rights Movement gave way to political assassinations and widespread bouts of violence in black communities during the summer months. Ringgold was inspired to paint the work in part by her extensive viewing of Pablo Picasso's painting Guernica (1937) during its longterm loan to the Museum of Modern Art (MoMA) in New York that began in 1939. Additionally, Ringgold was inspired by Jacob Lawrence's reimaginings of historical portraiture.

Die was shown for the first time at Ringgold's debut solo show, American People, in 1967 at Spectrum Gallery in New York. The opening reception for the show was attended by Romare Bearden and Richard Mayhew along with hundreds of the artist's friends and family; the gallery owner set up a record player and children danced to Motown music. Ringgold has said that an unidentified woman at the reception, upon seeing Die when exiting the elevator into the gallery, immediately "let out a yelp" and left the building. The artist has referred to the work as a mural since its original showing, despite the fact that political murals by black artists of the era were generally painted on buildings or shown in public spaces; curator Mark Godfrey argued that this distinction was meant to communicate Ringgold's desire to bring black artists, aesthetics, and politics into traditionally white institutional art spaces.

Following its original showing, Ringgold kept the work in storage along with The American People Series #18: The Flag is Bleeding (1967) for over 40 years. Prior to 2010, Die had only been brought out of storage for Ringgold's solo survey in 1973 at the Rutgers University Art Gallery, New Brunswick, New Jersey, and for Tradition and Conflict: Images of a Turbulent Decade, 1963-1967 (1985) at the Studio Museum in Harlem. The work was shown at Ringgold's retrospective American People, Black Light (2010) at the Neuberger Museum of Art, Purchase, New York, which traveled in 2013 to the National Museum of Women in the Arts, Washington, D.C. Following the retrospective, the work was shown in several exhibitions, including Post-Picasso: Contemporary Reactions (2014) at the Museu Picasso, Barcelona, and the original showing of Soul of a Nation: Art in the Age of Black Power (2017) at the Tate Modern, London.

MoMA acquired the painting in 2016 directly from Ringgold and subsequently showed it in the museum next to Picasso's painting Les Demoiselles D'Avignon (1907) starting in 2019. MoMA's choice of placement for Die was widely discussed by critics, art historians, and artists, some of whom, including Helen Molesworth, believed that placing Die next to Les Demoiselles D'Avignon served only to reiterate Picasso's place in the canon. Others, including Godfrey, believed the placement reflected Ringgold's own vision of "working [both] with and against the canon," as her work directly drew upon, acknowledged, and challenged canonical artistic figures like Picasso.

Following MoMA's acquisition of the work, Die was covered extensively in the media; the museum published Faith Ringgold: Die by Anne Monahan in 2018, from the One on One series of books focused on a single work, and the painting was reproduced on the cover of Artforum in January 2020. Die was featured in the original showing of Ringgold's retrospective Faith Ringold: American People (2022) at the New Museum, New York, and at Ringgold's first retrospective in France, Faith Ringgold: Black is Beautiful (2023) at the Musée Picasso, Paris.

== Reception ==
In a review in The New York Times of Ringgold's 1973 survey at the Rutgers University Art Gallery, critic Piri Halasz described Die as "an immense cry of rage," and called the series "Ringgold's most overtly ideological protests."

Critic Holland Cotter has praised the work, calling it "an accurate gauge of the mood of the day" in a 2010 review in The New York Times of Ringgold's Neuberger Museum of Art retrospective. He went on to describe the work in 2022 in the Times as "an explosive scene" and "a star attraction of the Museum of Modern Art’s much-watched 2019 permanent collection rehang."

Writing in The Washington Post in 2020, critic Sebastian Smee said Die "feels prophetically realistic" and that "its citrus palette of pinks and oranges against grays and blacks is nothing short of a masterpiece."

== See also ==
- List of works by Faith Ringgold

== Citations and references ==
=== Cited references ===
- Godfrey, Mark (2022). "Murals on 57th Street". In Massimiliano, Gioni; Carrion-Murayari, Gary (eds.). Faith Ringgold: American People. London: Phaidon Press Limited. pp. 22–30. ISBN 9781838664220.
