= List of works by Faith Ringgold =

American artist Faith Ringgold (October 8, 1930 – April 12, 2024) produced hundreds of paintings, quilts, mixed media works, posters, prints, sculptures, and soft sculptures over the course of her career, as well as more than 25 books, including illustrated children's books, artist's books, and an autobiography.

Below are chronological, though incomplete, lists of Ringgold's works by medium, with locations in public collections noted where known. Medium designations (e.g. print vs. poster) are Ringgold's own, as noted in the artist's extensive categorization system of the collection of her archives, works, and ephemera located at the David C. Driskell Center at the University of Maryland, College Park. Ringgold adapted many of her works into multiple mediums; versions in different mediums are noted individually. Images of Ringgold's work are subject to copyright by the artist's estate.

== Visual art ==
=== Paintings ===
==== On canvas ====
===== 1940s =====
- Early Works #1: Artist's Studio (1948)

===== 1950s =====
- Early Works #2: Girl With a Bow (1957)

===== 1960s =====
- Early Works #3: Portrait of a Young Girl (1962)
- Early Works #4: The Doctors (1962)
- Early Works #5: Mourners (1962)
- Early Works #6: Portrait of a Clown (1962)
- Early Works #7: Four Women at a Table (1962)
- Early Works #8: An Act of Violence (1962)
- Early Works #9: Brother and Sister (1962)
- Early Works #10: Summer Trees (1962)
- Early Works #11: Dead Trees (1962)
- Early Works #12: Green Trees (1962)
- The American People Series #1: Between Friends (1963), Neuberger Museum of Art, Purchase, New York
- The American People Series #2: For Members Only (1963)
- The American People Series #3: Neighbors (1963)
- The American People Series #4: The Civil Rights Triangle (1963), Glenstone, Potomac, Maryland
- The American People Series #5: Watching and Waiting (1963)
- Early Works #13: Nude Trees (1963)
- Early Works #15: They Speak No Evil (1963)
- The American People Series #6: Mr. Charlie (1964)
- The American People Series #7: The Cocktail Party (1964)
- The American People Series #8: The In Crowd (1964)
- The American People Series #9: The American Dream (1964)
- The American People Series #10: Study Now (1964)
- The American People Series #11: Three Men on a Fence (1964)
- The American People Series #12: The Family Plan (1964)
- The American People Series #13: God Bless America (1964)
- The American People Series #14: Portrait of an American Youth (1964)
- Early Works #16: A Man Kissing His Wife (1964)
- Early Works #17: Black Man (1964)
- Early Works #18: Two Guys Talking (1964)
- Early Works #19: Red, White and Blue Woman (1964)
- Early Works #20: Black and Blue Man (1964)
- Early Works #21: The Trio (1964)
- Early Works #22: Uptight Negro (1964)
- Early Works #23: Bride of Martha's Vineyard (1964)
- Early Works #24: Woman in a Red Dress (1965)
- Early Works #25: Self-Portrait (1965), Brooklyn Museum, New York
- Early Works #26: Tenement (1965)
- The American People Series #15: Hide Little Children (1966)
- The American People Series #16: Woman Looking in a Mirror (1966)
- The American People Series #17: The Artist and His Model (1966)
- Early Works #28: Portrait of a Young Boy #1 (1966)
- Early Works #29: Portrait of a Young Boy #2 (1966)
- The American People Series #18: The Flag is Bleeding (1967), National Gallery of Art, Washington, DC
- The American People Series #19: US Postage Commemorating the Advent of Black Power (1967)
- The American People Series #20: Die (1967), Museum of Modern Art, New York
- Black Light Series #1: Big Black (1967), Pérez Art Museum Miami
- Black Light Series #2: Man (1967)
- Black Light Series #3: Soul Sister (1967), Utah Museum of Fine Arts, Salt Lake City
- Early Works #27: Portrait of Mama Jones (1967)
- Black Light Series #3.1: Invisible Man (1968)
- Black Light Series #3.2: Invisible Woman (1968)
- Black Light Series #4: Mommy and Daddy (1969)
- Black Light Series #5: Black Art Poster (1969)
- Black Light Series #6: Love Black Life (1969)
- Black Light Series #7: Ego Painting (1969), Art Institute of Chicago
- Black Light Series #8: Red White and Black Nigger (1969), Harvard Art Museums, Cambridge, Massachusetts
- Black Light Series #9: The American Spectrum (1969)
- Black Light Series #10: Flag for the Moon: Die Nigger (1969), Glenstone, Potomac, Maryland
- Black Light Series #11: US America Black (1969)
- Black Light Series #12: Party Time (1969), Glenstone, Potomac, Maryland

===== 1970s =====
- For the Women's House (1972), Brooklyn Museum, New York (on long-term loan from Rikers Island, New York City Department of Correction)

===== 1980s =====
- Baby Faith and Willi #1 (1982)
- Baby Faith and Willi #2 (1982)
- Baby Faith and Willi #3 (1982)
- Baby Faith and Willi #4 (1982)
- Baby Faith and Willi #5 (1982)
- Dah #1 (1982)
- Dah #2 (1982)
- Dah #3 (1982)
- Dah #4 (1982)
- Emanon #1 (1982)
- Emanon #2 (1982)
- Emanon #3 (1982)
- Emanon #4 (1982)
- Emanon #5 (1982)
- Emanon #6 (1982)
- Emanon #7 (1982)
- Emanon #8 (1982)
- Emanon #9 (1982)
- Emanon #10 (1982)
- Emanon #11 (1982)
- Emanon #12 (1982)
- Emanon #13 (1982)
- Emanon #14 (1982)
- Emanon #15 (1982)
- California Dah #1 (1983)
- California Dah #2 (1983)
- California Dah #3 (1983)
- California Dah #4 (1983)

===== 2010s =====
- Where Do All The Children Go? (2010)

==== On paper ====
===== 1970s =====
- So Help Us Shirley #1: End Racism in America (1971)
- So Help Us Shirley #2: This Painting is of the American Landscape (1971)
- So Help Us Shirley #3: End the War (1971)
- So Help Us Shirley #4: This Land Belongs to You and Me (1971)
- So Help Us Shirley #5: Once Indians Owned America (1971)
- So Help Us Shirley #6: To All Political Prisoners (1971)
- So Help Us Shirley #7: In Tribute to All the Dead in Vietnam (1971)
- So Help Us Shirley #8: End the War in Vietnam (1971)
- Political Landscape #1: A Tribute (1972)
- Political Landscape #2: For All The Black Women (1972)
- Political Landscape #3: Painted by Faith Ringgold in Salute... (1972)
- Political Landscape #4: Faith Ringgold (1972)
- Political Landscape #5: To All the Black Women (1972)
- Political Landscape #6: A Plea To Young Black (1972)
- Political Landscape #7: This Painting Is Of The American Landscape (1972)
- Political Landscape #8: The Trees (1972)
- Political Landscape #9: To The Black Women (1972)
- Political Landscape #10: To The Eternity of... (1972)
- Political Landscape #11: Have You Ever Felt Comfort... (1972)
- Political Landscape #12: Long After... (1972)
- Political Landscape #13: All The Wars Are Fought (1972)
- Political Landscape #14: If The Trees Could Talk (1972)
- Political Landscape #15: We Are All Equal (1972)
- Political Landscape #16: The Faithful Tree (1972)
- Political Landscape #17: The Beauty of Nature (1972)
- Political Landscape #18: I Don't Paint From Nature (1972)
- Political Landscape #19: He's Leaving Her (1972)
- Political Landscape #20: I Could Tell You (1972)
- Political Landscape #21: Dear Brother Ain't No Wise... (1972)
- Political Landscape #22: And Uh Something Else... (1972)
- Political Landscape #23: Brother Talkin About (1972)
- Political Landscape #24: Brother Learn How To (1972)
- Political Landscape #25: Night Comes Like A... (1972)
- Political Landscape #26: Just As You Black Man... (1972)
- Political Landscape #27: Sister Please... (1972)
- Political Landscape #28 (c.1972)
- Political Landscape #29 (c.1972)
- Political Landscape #30: To The Sisters... (1972)
- Political Landscape #31: Sister I Know (1972)
- Political Landscape #32: In Favor of Male... (1972)
- Political Landscape #33: Not Having A Man... (1972)
- Political Landscape #34: To The Feminist (1972)
- Political Landscape #35: Sister Don't You Agree... (1972)
- Political Landscape #36: The Old Men of Art (1972)
- Political Landscape #37: I Don't Want... (1972)
- Political Landscape #38: Art Is Not Dead... (1972)
- Political Landscape #39: In London, Black Art... (1972)
- Political Landscape #40: Why Go To Documenta (1972)
- Political Landscape #41: Brothers Leroi... (1972)
- Political Landscape #42: Whoever Let Men... (1972)
- Political Landscape #43: What You Think... (1972)
- Political Landscape #44: Sisters Beware (1972)
- Political Landscape #45: Men Live To Fight... (1972)
- Political Landscape #46: Women Top Talking... (1972)
- Political Landscape #47: War Is Not For Us... (1972)
- Political Landscape #48: I Cannot Be Sure (1972)
- Political Landscape #49: It Is Foolish to... (1972)
- Political Landscape #50: There Are Certain Things... (1972)
- Political Landscape #51: Summer Games... (1972)
- Political Landscape #52: The Summer Games Were... (1972)
- Political Landscape #53: Even Though... (1972)
- Political Landscape #54: Germany They Call... (1972)
- Political Landscape #55: Next Time Save The People... (1972)
- Political Landscape #56: Remember The Munich... (1972)
- Political Landscape #57: For Those Who Are... (1972)

===== 1990s =====
- Freedom of Speech (1990), Metropolitan Museum of Art, New York
- For Good Years and then 4 More (1993)
- The following works were adapted into Flying Home: Harlem Heroes and Heroines (1996), Mosaic mural, 125th Street station, Metropolitan Transportation Authority, New York:
  - Flying Home (1996)
  - Apollo Theater The Ink Spots: Jerry Daniels, Deek Watson, Billy Bowen, and Bill Kenny (1996)
  - Harlem Heroes and Heroines #2: Marion Aderson, Paul Robeson (1996)
  - Harlem Heroes and Heroines #3: Josephine Baker, Bessie Smith, Duke Ellington (1996)
  - Harlem Heroes and Heroines #4: Joe Lewis, Sugar Ray (1996)
  - Harlem Heroes and Heroines #5: Normal Lewis, Augusta Savage, Romare Bearden, Aaron Douglas, Jacob Law (1996)
  - Harlem Heroes and Heroines #6: Madame Walker, Jesse Owens (1996)
  - Harlem Heroes and Heroines #7: Adam Powell, Marcus Garvey (1996)
  - Harlem Heroes and Heroines #8: Countee Cullen, Zora Neale Hurston, James Baldwin, Langston Hughes (1996)
  - Flying Home: Harlem Heroes and Heroines (Uptown) (1996)
  - Harlem Heroes and Heroines #10: Malcolm X, Martin Luther King (1996)
- Jazz Stories 1/9: Mama Can Sing (1996)
- Jazz Stories 2/9: Mama Can Sing (1996)

===== 2000s =====
- Freedom Flag: On Tuesday Morning (2001), Pennsylvania Academy of the Fine Arts, Philadelphia
- Jazz Stories 3/9, 4/22/01: Mama Can Sing (2001)
- Jazz Stories 4/9, 4/22/01: Mama Can Sing (2001)
- Jazz Stories 5/9, 4/22/01: Mama Can Sing (2001)
- Jazz Stories 6/9, 4/22/01: Mama Can Sing (2001)
- Jazz Stories 7/9: Mama Can Sing (2001)
- Jazz Stories 8/9, 4/22/2001: Mama Can Sing (2001)
- Jazz Stories 9/9, 4/22/01: Mama Can Sing (2001)
- Jazz Stories: Mama Can Sing (2003)
- Jazz Stories: Papa Can Blow (2003)
- Jazz Stories 1/7: Mama Can Sing (2004)
- Jazz Stories 2/7: Mama Can Sing (2004)
- Jazz Stories 3/7: Mama Can Sing (2004)
- Jazz Stories 4/7: Mama Can Sing (2004)
- Jazz Stories 5/7: Mama Can Sing (2004)
- Jazz Stories 6/7: Mama Can Sing (2004)
- Jazz Stories 7/7, 4/22/01: Mama Can Sing (2004)
- Jazz Stories: Sonny Blows 1/3 (2004)
- Jazz Stories: Sonny Blows 2/3 (2004)
- Jazz Stories: Sonny Blows 3/3 (2004)
- Freedom Flag Story #4, 2003 (2002)
- Freedom Flag Story #4, 2002 (2002)
- Freedom Flag Story [untitled] (2002)
- Freedom Flag Story (2002)
- Freedom Flag Story (2002)
- Freedom Flag Story (2002)
- Freedom Flag Story [untitled] (c.2002)
- Freedom Flag Story (2002)
- Freedom Flag Story (2002)
- Coming to Jones Road 7: A Chalk White Moon (c.2000s)
- Alice Neel: Wonder Woman that she was, 2004 (2004)
- Hate is a Sin Flag (2007), Whitney Museum of American Art, New York
- Hate is a Sin Fable (2007)
- The following works were adapted into People Portraits: in Creativity; Performing; Sports and Fashion (2009), Mosaic murals, Civic Center/Grand Park station, Los Angeles County Metropolitan Transportation Authority:
  - People Portraits Line E Creating #1 (2007)
  - People Portraits Line E Creating #2 (2007)
  - People Portraits Line E Creating #3 (2007)
  - People Portraits Line E Creating #4 (2007)
  - People Portraits Line E Creating #5 (2007)
  - People Portraits Line E Creating #6 (2007)
  - People Portraits Line E Creating #7 (2007)
  - People Portraits Line E Creating #8 (2007)
  - People Portraits Line E Creating #9 (2007)
  - People Portraits Line E Creating #10 (2007)
  - People Portraits Line E Creating #11 (2007)
  - People Portraits Line E Creating #12 (2007)
  - People Portraits Line E Creating #13 (2007)
  - People Portraits Line E Creating #14 (2007)
  - People Portraits Line F Performing #1 (2007)
  - People Portraits Line F Performing #2-3 (2007)
  - People Portraits Line F Performing #4-5 (2007)
  - People Portraits Line F Performing #6-7 (2007)
  - People Portraits Line F Performing #8-9 (2007)
  - People Portraits Line F Performing #10-11 (2007)
  - People Portraits Line M Playing Sports #1 (2007)
  - People Portraits Line M Playing Sports #2 (2007)
  - People Portraits Line M Playing Sports #3 (2007)
  - People Portraits Line M Playing Sports #4 (2007)
  - People Portraits Line M Playing Sports #5 (2007)
  - People Portraits Line M Playing Sports #6 (2007)
  - People Portraits Line M Playing Sports #7 (2007)
  - People Portraits Line M Playing Sports #8 (2007)
  - People Portraits Line M Playing Sports #9 (2007)
  - People Portraits Line M Playing Sports #10 (2007)
  - People Portraits Line M Playing Sports #11 (2007)
  - People Portraits Line M Playing Sports #12 (2007)
  - People Portraits Line M Playing Sports #13 (2007)
  - People Portraits Line M Playing Sports #14 (2007)
  - People Portraits Line M Playing Sports #15 (2007)
  - People Portraits Line N Styling #1 (2007)
  - People Portraits Line N Styling #2 (2007)
  - People Portraits Line N Styling #3 (2007)
  - People Portraits Line N Styling #4 (2007)
  - People Portraits Line N Styling #5 (2007)
  - People Portraits Line N Styling #6 (2007)
  - People Portraits Line N Styling #7 (2007)
  - People Portraits Line N Styling #8 (2007)
  - People Portraits Line N Styling #9 (2007)
  - People Portraits Line N Styling #10 (2007)
  - People Portraits Line N Styling #11 (2007)
  - People Portraits Line N Styling #12 (2007)
  - People Portraits Line N Styling #13 (2007)
- 1. All Men Are Created Equal (2008)
- 2. And Women? (2008)
- 3. taxes on Us Without Our Consent (2008)
- 4. Absolut Tyranny (2008)
- 5. We Have Appealed to their Native Justice and Magnamity (2008)
- 6. As Free and Independent States (2008)
- Philippe de Montebello (2008)
- Yes We Did (2009)
- Yes We Did (2009)
- Yes I Can Playing Cards suite (2009)

===== 2010s =====
- Dear Selma (2010)
- Mahalia We Love You (2010)
- Romie We Love You (2010)
- Born in The USA (2011)
- Bob Steele We Love You (c.2011-2012)
- Channel Thirteen 50 Years 1962 to 2012 (2012)
- ACLU 50 YEARS 1962 to 2012 Liberty and Democracy, Justice and Equality (2012)
- Myrah Brown Green We Love You (2012)
- Ferris We Love You (2012)

=== Posters and prints ===
==== Posters ====
Posters are in series of multiples and may be located in multiple collections; original poster noted where known.

===== 1970s =====
- The People's Flag Show (1970), Harvard Art Museums, Cambridge, Massachusetts; Hood Museum of Art, Hanover, New Hampshire; and Museum of Modern Art, New York
- Committee To Defend the Panthers (1970), Museum of Modern Art, New York (original poster)
- All Power to the People (1970)
- Woman Freedom Now (1971), Museum of Modern Art, New York (original poster)
- Woman Free Yourself (1971), Museum of Modern Art, New York
- America Free Angela (1971), National Museum of African American History and Culture, Smithsonian Institution, Washington, DC
- United States of Attica (1971-1972), Art Institute of Chicago; Harvard Art Museums, Cambridge, Massachusetts; Hood Museum of Art, Hanover, New Hampshire; Museum of Fine Arts, Houston; Museum of Modern Art, New York; and Whitney Museum of American Art, New York

===== 1980s =====
- Save Our Children in Atlanta (1980), National Museum of American History, Smithsonian Institution, Washington, DC
- Women Free Angela (1984), Whitney Museum of American Art, New York (original poster)
- Twenty Years of Painting, Sculpture: Who's Afraid of Aunt Jemima? (1984)

===== 1990s =====
- Freedom of Speech (1990)
- African American Women in Defense of Themselves (1990)
- Women's Work Counts (1995)
- New York is Book Country (1995)
- The Black Family Dinner Quilt (1995)
- Dancing at the Louvre (1999)

===== 2000s =====
- Pasadena City College, Artist in Residence March 6–10, 2000 (2000)
- Yes We Did (2009)
- Yes We Did (2009)

===== 2010s =====
- Born in the USA (2011)
- Mahalia We Love You (2011)
- Romie We Love You (2011)
- Channel Thirteen 50 YEARS 1962-2012 (2012)
- ACLU Defending Freedom Justice Liberty and Democracy (2012)
- Myrah Brown Green We Love You (2012)

==== Prints ====
Prints are in series of multiples and may be located in multiple collections.

===== 1970s =====
- The Judson 3 (1970), Baltimore Museum of Art; Harvard Art Museums, Cambridge, Massachusetts; International Center of Photography, New York

===== 1980s =====
- Save Life on Earth 3/3 (1984)
- Death of Apartheid (1984)
- Death of Apartheid #1 (1984)
- Slave Rape (1984)
- Slave Rape #2 (1984)
- No More War (1984)
- No More War #1 (1984)
- Woman Power, Poverty and Love (1984)
- Woman Power, Poverty and Love #2 (1984)

===== 1990s =====
- Anyone Can Fly, 1993 (1993)
- Tar Beach (1993)
- Jo Baker's Birthday (1995), Brooklyn Museum, New York
- Seven Passages to a Flight (1996)
- Sunflower Quilting Bee at Arles, 1991 (1996), Colby College Museum of Art, Waterville, Maine; Milwaukee Art Museum; Muscarelle Museum of Art, Williamsburg, Virginia; and Pennsylvania Academy of the Fine Arts, Philadelphia
- Groovin High (1996), Mattatuck Museum, Waterbury, Connecticut
- We Flew Over The Bridge (1997), Springfield Art Museum, Missouri
- Anyone Can Fly (1997)
- Sunflower Quilting Bee at Arles (1997)
- We Came To America (1998)

===== 2000s =====
- Untitled (2000)
- Under a Blood Red Sky #1 (2000)
- Faith's Garden Party #1 (2000)
- Under a Blood Red Sky #2 (2000)
- Under a Blood Red Sky #3 (2000)
- Under a Blood Red Sky #3 (2001), Metropolitan Museum of Art, New York
- Faith's Garden Party #2 (2001)
- Faith's Garden Party #3 (2002)
- Wynton's Tune, 2002 (2002)
- Tar Beach 2 (2003)
- Mama Can Sing (2003)
- Papa Can Blow (2003)
- On Tuesday Morning (2003)
- Mama Can Sing, Papa Can Blow (2003)
- Under a Blood Red Sky #4 (2004), Pennsylvania Academy of the Fine Arts, Philadelphia
- Somebody Stole My Broken Heart (2004)
- You Put The Devil In Me (2004), Pennsylvania Academy of the Fine Arts, Philadelphia
- Wynton's Tune (2004)
- Mama Can Sing (2004)
- Under a Blood Red Sky #5 (2004), Pennsylvania Academy of the Fine Arts, Philadelphia
- Papa Can Blow (2005)
- Under a Blood Red Sky #6 (2005)
- Alice, Wonder Woman That She Was (2005)
- Aunt Emmy (2005)
- Under a Blood Red Sky #7 (2005)
- Angels Whispering in the Night (2005)
- Under a Blood Red Sky #8 (2006)
- Under a Blood Red Sky #9 (2006)
- Come On Dance With Me #1 (2006)
- Nobody Will Ever Love You Like I Do (2006), Pennsylvania Academy of the Fine Arts, Philadelphia
- Somebody Stole My Broken Heart (2007), Pennsylvania Academy of the Fine Arts, Philadelphia
- Anyone Can Fly #2 (2007)
- Hate is a Sin Flag (2007), Mount Holyoke College Art Museum, South Hadley, Massachusetts and Whitney Museum of American Art, New York
- Hate is a Sin Fable (2007), Whitney Museum of American Art, New York
- A Letter From a Birmingham Jail (2007)
- A Letter From a Birmingham Jail #1 (2007)
- A Letter From a Birmingham Jail #2: 4 Little Girls (2007)
- A Letter From a Birmingham Jail #3: For Whites Only (2007)
- A Letter From a Birmingham Jail #4: Brown VS Board of Education (2007)
- A Letter From a Birmingham Jail #5: The Right to Vote (2007)
- A Letter From a Birmingham Jail #6: Police Brutality (2007)
- A Letter From a Birmingham Jail #7: Slavery (2007)
- A Letter From a Birmingham Jail #8: Montgomery Bus Boycott (2007)
- Under A Blood Red Sky #8 (2007), Ruth Chandler Williamson Gallery, Claremont, California
- Under A Blood Red Sky #9 (2007), Harvard Art Museums, Cambridge, Massachusetts and Pennsylvania Academy of the Fine Arts, Philadelphia
- Declaration of Freedom and Independence #1: All Men Are Created Equal (2008)
- Declaration of Freedom and Independence 2: And Women? (2008)
- Declaration of Freedom and Independence #3: Absolute Tyranny (2008)
- Declaration of Freedom and Independence #4: Without Our Consent (2008)
- Declaration of Freedom and Independence #5: We Have Appealed (2008)
- Declaration of Freedom and Independence #6: As Free and Independent States (2008)
- Idaho Black History Museum (2009)
- Yes We Did (2009)

===== 2010s =====
- Where Do All The Children Go? (2010)
- Henry Ossawa Tanner: A Boyhood Dream Comes True (2010), Pennsylvania Academy of the Fine Arts, Philadelphia
- Coming to Jones Road Part 2: We Here Now (2010)
- Big Black (2010)
- Dear Selma, 2010 (2010), Yale University Art Gallery, New Haven, Connecticut
- Oprah We Love You (2011)
- Mahalia We Love You (2011)
- Romie We Love You (2011)
- Born in the USA (2011)
- Channel Thirteen 1962-2012 (2012)
- Myrah Brown Green We Love You, 2012 (2012)
- ACLU Liberty Justice and Equality for all, 2012 (2012)
- To Be or Not to Be Free, 2014 (2014), Snite Museum of Art, South Bend, Indiana
- Here Comes Moses (2014), Museum of Fine Arts, Boston and Virginia Museum of Fine Arts, Richmond

=== Quilts ===
Select quilts are in series of multiple editions and may be located in multiple collections; quilt editions noted where known.

==== Painted and sewn quilts ====
===== 1980s =====
- Echoes of Harlem (1980), Studio Museum in Harlem, New York
- Mothers Quilt (1983)
- Who's Afraid of Aunt Jemima? (1983), Glenstone, Potomac, Maryland
- Flag Story Quilt (1984), Spencer Museum of Art, Lawrence, Kansas
- No More War #1 (1985)
- No More War #2 (1985)
- Now You Have Touched the Women #1 (1985)
- Now You Have Touched the Women #2 (1985)
- Slave Rape Story Quilt (1985)
- Street Story Quilt, Parts I-III: Accident, Fire, Homecoming (1985), Metropolitan Museum of Art, New York
- Change 1: Over 100 Pound Weight Loss Performance Story Quilt (1986)
- The Dinner Quilt (1986)
- Groovin High (1986)
- The Lover’s Trilogy #1: The Wedding (c.1986)
- The Lover’s Trilogy #2: Sleeping (1986)
- The Lover's Trilogy #3: The Funeral (1986)
- Mask Face Quilt #1: The Women (1986)
- Mask Face Quilt #2: The Men (1986)
- Sonny's Bridge (1986), High Museum of Art, Atlanta
- The Purple Quilt (1986)
- Change (c.1986-1987)
- Love Letter #2: Kiss 1 Kiss 2 #1 (1987)
- Love Letter #2: Kiss 1 Kiss 2 #1 (1987)
- Love Letter #3: Kiss 1 Kiss 2 #2 (1987)
- Love Letter #4 (1987)
- Love Letter #5 (1987)
- My Best Friend #1 (1987)
- My Best Friend #2 (1987)
- Politically Correct Sheet Series: Death of Apartheid #1 of 2 (1987)
- Politically Correct Sheet Series: Death of Apartheid #2 of 2 (1987)
- Politically Correct Sheet Series: Slave Rape #1 of 2 (1987)
- Politically Correct Sheet Series: Slave Rape #2 of 2 (1987)
- Politically Correct Sheet Series: Woman Power Poverty and Love #1 of 2 (1987)
- Politically Correct Sheet Series: Woman Power Poverty and Love #2 of 2 (1987)
- South African Love Story Part 1 of 2 (1985-1987)
- South African Love Story Part 2 of 2 (1985-1987)
- Subway Graffiti #1 of 3 (1987)
- Subway Graffiti #2 of 3 (1987)
- Subway Graffiti #3 of 3 (1987), Brigham Young University Museum of Art, Provo, Utah
- Woman Power Poverty and Love (1987)
- The Bitter Nest, Part I: Love in the School Yard (1987), Phoenix Art Museum
- The Bitter Nest, Part II: The Harlem Renaissance Party (1987), Smithsonian American Art Museum, Smithsonian Institution, Washington DC
- The Bitter Nest, Part III: Lovers in Paris (1987)
- The Bitter Nest, Part IV: The Letter (1988)
- The Bitter Nest, Part V: The Homecoming (1988), Currier Museum of Art, Manchester, New Hampshire
- Camille's Husband's Birthday Quilt (1988)
- Change 2: Faith Ringgold’s More Than 100 Pounds Weight Loss Performance Story Quilt (1988)
- Church Picnic (1988), High Museum of Art, Atlanta
- Dream 2: King & the Sisterhood (1988), Museum of Fine Arts, Boston
- Who’s Bad? (1988)
- Woman on a Bridge #1 of 5: Tar Beach (1988), Solomon R. Guggenheim Museum, New York
- Woman on a Bridge #2 of 5: Double Dutch on the Golden Gate Bridge (1988)
- Woman on a Bridge #3 of 5: Painting the Bay Bridge (1988)
- Woman on a Bridge #4 of 5: The Winner (1988)
- Woman on a Bridge #5 of 5: Women Dancing on the George Washington Bridge (1988)
- Woman Flying with Bouquet (1988)
- Knox Clayton (1989)
- Maya's Quilt (1989), Crystal Bridges Museum of American Art, Bentonville, Arkansas
- 100 Years at Williams College (1989), Williams College Museum of Art, Williamstown, Massachusetts

===== 1990s =====
- Arthur Schomberg (1990)
- Zora Neale Hurston (1990)
- Ralph Ellison (1990)
- Alice Walker (1990)
- Tar Beach 2 (1990), 4 series of 24 (1990), 3 (1990), 7 (1993), and 5 (1993/2000); Philadelphia Museum of Art; Pennsylvania Academy of the Fine Arts, Philadelphia; and Virginia Museum of Fine Arts, Richmond
- Change 3: Faith Ringgold’s Over 100 Pound Weight Loss Performance Story Quilt (1991), Glenstone, Potomac, Maryland
- The French Collection Part I, #1: Dancing at the Louvre (1991), Gund Gallery, Kenyon College, Gambier, Ohio
- The French Collection Part I, #2: Wedding on the Seine (1991)
- The French Collection Part I, #3: The Picnic at Giverny (1991)
- The French Collection Part I, #4: Sunflower Quilting Bee at Arles (1991)
- The French Collection Part I, #5: Matisse's Model (1991), Baltimore Museum of Art
- The French Collection Part I, #6: Matisse’s Chapel (1991)
- The French Collection Part I, #7: Picasso's Studio (1991), Worcester Art Museum, Massachusetts
- The French Collection Part I, #8: On the Beach at St. Tropez (1991)
- The French Collection Part II, #9: Dinner at Gertrude Stein's (1991)
- The French Collection Part II, #10: Jo Baker's Birthday (1993), Saint Louis Art Museum
- Shades of Alice (1993)
- Marlon Riggs: Tongues Untied (1993)
- Mealtime Dialogue: The Black Family Dinner Quilt (1993)
- Crown Heights Children's History Story Quilt (1994), PS 22, New York City School Construction Authority
- Eugenia Maria de Hostos: A Man and His Dream (1994)
- The French Collection Part II, #11: Le Café des Artistes (1994)
- Seven Passages to a Flight (1995), series of 10; Memorial Art Gallery, Rochester, New York; San Diego Museum of Art; and National Portrait Gallery, Washington, D.C.
- Oklahoma Children's Quilt (1996)
- Working Women (1996)
- The French Collection Part II, #12: Moroccan Holiday (1997), Norton Museum of Art, Palm Beach, Florida.
- The American Collection #1: We Came to America (1997), Pennsylvania Academy of the Fine Arts, Philadelphia
- The American Collection #2: A Family Portrait (1997)
- The American Collection #3: Born in a Cotton Field (1997)
- The American Collection #4: Jo Baker’s Bananas (1997), National Museum of Women in the Arts, Washington, DC
- The American Collection #5: Bessie's Blues (1997), Art Institute of Chicago
- The American Collection #6: The Flag is Bleeding #2 (1997), Glenstone, Potomac, Maryland
- Unfinished American Collection #7: Stompin at the Savoy (1997-unfinished)
- The American Collection #8: Cotton Fields, Sunflowers, Blackbirds, and Quilting Bees (1997)
- The American Collection #9: The Two Jemimas (1997), Glenstone, Potomac, Maryland
- The American Collection #10: Wanted: Douglass, Tubman, and Truth (1997)
- The American Collection #11: Listen to the Trees (1997)
- The American Collection #12: Picnic on the Grass Alone (1997)
- Coming to Jones Road Part 1 #1 (1999)
- Coming to Jones Road Part 1, #2: Sunday Evening (1999)
- Coming to Jones Road Part 1, #3: Aunt Emmy (1999)

===== 2000s =====
- Coming to Jones Road Part 1, #4: Under a Blood Red Sky (2000), series of 20, Weatherspoon Art Museum, Greensboro, North Carolina
- Coming to Jones Road Part 1, #5: A Long and Lonely Night (2000), Dallas Museum of Art
- Coming to Jones Road Part 1, #6: Baby Freedom Came One Day (2000)
- Coming to Jones Road Part 1, #7: We Jus Keep a Comin (2000)
- Coming to Jones Road Part 1, #8: Only the Children (2000)
- Banner Quilt #1: Under A Blood Red Sky (2000)
- Banner Quilt #2: Only the Children (2000)
- Banner Quilt #3: We Jus Keep a Comin (2000)
- Jazz Stories: Mama Can Sing, Papa Can Blow #1: Somebody Stole My Broken Heart (2004)
- Jazz Stories: Mama Can Sing, Papa Can Blow #2: Come On Dance With Me (2004)
- Jazz Stories: Mama Can Sing, Papa Can Blow #3: Gonna Get On Away From You (2004)
- Jazz Stories: Mama Can Sing, Papa Can Blow #4: Nobody Will Ever Love You Like I Do (2004)
- Jazz Stories: Mama Can Sing, Papa Can Blow #5: You Put The Devil In Me (2004)
- Jazz Stories: Mama Can Sing, Papa Can Blow #6: I'm Leavin In The Mornin (2004)
- Jazz Stories: Mama Can Sing, Papa Can Blow #7: Love Me (2004)
- Jacobs Ladder Wedding Chuppa (2005)
- Jazz Stories: Mama Can Sing, Papa Can Blow #8: Don't Wanna Love You Like I Do (2007)
- Our Ancestors (2007)
- The Declaration of Freedom and Independence (2009)

===== 2010s =====
- Coming to Jones Road Part 2, #1: Birdie Dedicated to You (2010)
- Coming to Jones Road Part 2, #2: We Here Aunt Emmy Got Us Now (2010)
- Coming to Jones Road Part 2, #3: Aunt Emmy and Baby Freedom (2010)
- Coming to Jones Road Part 2, #4: Aunt Emmy and Uncle Tate (2010)
- Coming to Jones Road Part 2, #5: Precious, Barn Door, and Baby Freedom (2010), Indianapolis Museum of Art
- Coming to Jones Road Part 2, #6: Chasing Butterflies (2010)
- Coming to Jones Road Part 2, #7: Our Secret Wedding in the Woods (2010)
- Listen to the Trees Quilt (2012), series of 15 (2012-2013)

==== Tankas ====
===== 1970s =====
- Feminist Series #1: What a Responsibility (1972)
- Feminist Series #2: What If I am a Woman? (1972)
- Feminist Series #3: I Used to Work in the Fields (1972)
- Feminist Series #4: I Have to Answer (1972)
- Feminist Series #5: And If Colored Men (1972)
- Feminist Series #6: There Was One of Two Things (1972)
- Feminist Series #7: We Are Now Trying (1972)
- Feminist Series #8: I Know That... (1972)
- Feminist Series #9: We Have All Been... (1972)
- Feminist Series #11: I Don't Want You To... (1972)
- Feminist Series #12: We Meet the Monster (1972)
- Feminist Series #13: Let Us No Longer... (1972)
- Feminist Series #15: No Woman Can Probably... (1972)
- Feminist Series #16: And Man Is So Selfish... (1972)
- Feminist Series #17: Africa Must Be For... (1972)
- Feminist Series #19: Be Not Discouraged... (1972)
- Feminist Series #20: Wanted to Tell You (1972)
- Slave Rape #1 of 3: Fear Will Make You Weak (1972), Glenstone, Potomac, Maryland
- Slave Rape #2 of 3: Run You Might Get Away (1972), Glenstone, Potomac, Maryland
- Slave Rape #3 of 3: Fight to Save Your Life (1972), Glenstone, Potomac, Maryland
- Slave Rape #1 of 16: Run You Might Get Away (c.1973)
- Slave Rape #2 of 16: Run You Might Get Away (1973)
- Slave Rape #3 of 16: Run You Might Get Away (1973)
- Slave Rape #4 of 16: Run You Might Get Away (1973)
- Slave Rape #6 of 16: Fight To Save Your Life (1973)
- Slave Rape #7 of 16: Fight To Save Your Life (1973)
- Slave Rape #8 of 16: Fight To Save Your Life (1973)
- Slave Rape #9 of 16: Fight To Save Your Life (1973)
- Slave Rape #10 of 16: Fight To Save Your Life (1973)
- Slave Rape #11 of 16: Fight To Save Your Life (1973)
- Slave Rape #12 of 16: Fight To Save Your Life (1973)
- Slave Rape #13 of 16: Fight To Save Your Life (1973)
- Slave Rape #14 of 16: Help your Sister (1973)
- Slave Rape #15 of 16: Help your Sister (1973)
- Slave Rape #16 of 16: Help your Sister (1973)
- Windows of the Wedding #1: Woman (1974)
- Windows of the Wedding #2: Breakfast in Bed (1974)
- Windows of the Wedding #3: Woman #2 (1974)
- Windows of the Wedding #4: Man (1974)
- Windows of the Wedding #5: Women and Children (1974)
- Windows of the Wedding #6: Patience and Responsibility (1974)
- Windows of the Wedding #7: Small Talk (1974)
- Windows of the Wedding #8: Night (1974)
- Windows of the Wedding #9: Life (1974)
- Windows of the Wedding #10: Family (1974)
- Windows of the Wedding #11: Peaceful Love (1974)
- Windows of the Wedding #12: Love (1974)
- Windows of the Wedding #13: Mother (1974)
- Windows of the Wedding #14: Father (1974)
- Windows of the Wedding #15: Friends (1974)
- Windows of the Wedding #16: Lovers (1974)
- Windows of the Wedding #17: Equals (1974)
- Windows of the Wedding #18: Not So Equals (1974)
- Windows of the Wedding #19: Children (1974)
- Windows of the Wedding #20: No Children (1974)

===== 1990s =====
- Feminist Series #10: Of My Two Handicaps (1972/1993), Whitney Museum of American Art, New York
- Feminist Series #14: Men Of Eminence... (1972/1993)
- Feminist Series #18: "Mr. Black Man Watch Your Step" (1972/1993)

===== 2010s =====
- Coming to Jones Road Part 2: Harriet Tubman Tanka #1: Escape to Freedom (2010)
- Coming to Jones Road Part 2: Sojourner Truth Tanka #2: Ain’t I A Woman? (2010)
- Coming to Jones Road Part 2: Martin Luther King Jr. Tanka #3: I Have A Dream (2010)

=== Stained glass ===
==== 2020s ====
- In the Classroom: Grace Hopper (2022), Grace Hopper College, Yale University, New Haven, Connecticut
- Painting: Grace Hopper (2022), Grace Hopper College, Yale University, New Haven, Connecticut
- Pottery Studio (2022), Grace Hopper College, Yale University, New Haven, Connecticut
- Basketball (2022), Grace Hopper College, Yale University, New Haven, Connecticut
- Library (2022), Grace Hopper College, Yale University, New Haven, Connecticut
- Dining (2022), Grace Hopper College, Yale University, New Haven, Connecticut

=== Masks, sculptural works, and toys ===
==== Dolls ====
===== 1970s =====
- Puppet Doll #1 (1973)
- Puppet Doll #2 (1973)
- Puppet Doll #3 (1973)
- Puppet Doll #4 (1973)
- Puppet Doll #5 (1973)
- Puppet Doll #6 (1973)
- Puppet Doll #7 (1973)
- Puppet Doll #8 (1973)
- Puppet Doll #9 (1973)
- Moma Doll (1973)
- Granny Doll (1973)
- Mom and Pop Doll (1973)
- Gourd Head Dolls (Carrie and Louise) (1973)
- Gourd Head Dolls (Leila and Myrtle) (1973)
- Untitled (1973)
- Soft Head Dolls (1973)
- Moma Doll (1975)
- Henri and Joan (1975)
- Ms. Lucy (1976)
- Jemima (1976)
- Brenda (1976)
- Abdullah and Queen (1976)
- Aunt Connie (1976)
- Markola Market Woman (1976)
- Original Male and Female (1978)
- Juanita and Eddie (1978)
- Tina and Frank (1979)
- Frank and Tina (1979)
- Abdullah and BaBa (1979)
- TeTe (1979)
- Betty and Tut (1979)
- Malti and Buddha (1979)
- Queenie and Greg (1979)
- Queenie and Greg (1979)
- Queenie and Greg (1979)
- Pat and Tony (1979)
- Pearl and Sam (1979)
- Sam and Pearl (1979)
- Ramon and Anita (1979)
- Bill and Happi (1979)
- Muhammed and Mariam (1979)
- Fredia and Sol (1979)
- Willi and Tom (1979)
- Chee Chee (1979)
- The Carters (Rosalyn, Amy, and Jimmy) (1979)

===== 1980s =====
- Ringgold Doll Kit (Sew Real) (1979-1981)
- Little Sister (1981)
- Little Brother (1981)
- Mommy (1981)
- Daddy (1981)
- Untitled (1981)
- Painted Dolls (1982)
- Purple Doll #1 (1986)
- Purple Doll #2 (1986)
- Purple Doll #3 (1986)
- Purple Doll #4 (1986)
- Purple Doll #5 (1986)

==== Masks ====
===== 1970s =====
- Women's Liberation Talking Mask (1973)
- African Design Face Mask (1973)
- Kissing Witch #1 (1973)
- Kissing Witch #2 (1973)
- Weeping Woman Mask #1 (1973)
- Weeping Woman Mask #2 (1973)
- Weeping Woman Mask #3 (1973)
- Weeping Woman Mask #4 (1973)
- Male Face Mask (1973)
- Hat Mask #1 (1973)
- Hat Mask #2 (1973)
- Family of Woman Mask #1: Faith #1 (1973)
- Family of Woman Mask #2: Ms. Brown, Catherine, Delores and Elsie (1973)
- Family of Woman Mask #3: Mrs. Jones, Andrew, Barbara and Faith (1973)
- Family of Woman Mask #4: Ms. Curry and Charles (1973)
- Family of Woman Mask #5: Ms. Lottie Belle and Junior (1973)
- Family of Woman Mask #6: Ms. Vi and Brother (1973)
- Family of Woman Mask #7: Ms. Florence and Junior (1973)
- Family of Woman Mask #8: Ms. Bert and Delores #1 (1973)
- Family of Woman Mask #9: Ms. Bert and Delores #2 (1973)
- Family of Woman Mask #10: Ms. Ruth and Charles (1973)
- Family of Woman Mask #11: Aunt Edith (1974)
- Family of Woman Mask #12: Aunt Bessie (1974)
- Family of Woman Mask #13: Faith #2 (1974)
- Family of Woman Mask #14: Bernice (1974)
- Helmet Mask #1: Joanna (1975)
- Helmet Mask #2: Leroy (1975)
- Helmet Mask #3: Mama (1975)
- Helmet Mask #4: Rev. Adam Clayton Powell (1975)
- Helmet Mask #5: Martin Luther King (1975)
- Helmet Mask #6: Reverend Proctor (1975)
- Helmet Mask #7: Molly (1975)
- Helmet Mask #8: Bruce (1975)
- Gold Face Mask (1976)
- Silver Face Mask (1976)
- Black Face Mask #1 (1976)
- Black Face Mask #2 (1976)
- Black Face Mask #3 (1976)
- Black Face Mask #4 (1976)
- Black Face Mask #5 (1976)
- Flower Face Mask #1 (1976)
- Flower Face Mask #2 (1976)
- Flower Face Mask #3 (1976)
- Flower Face Mask #4 (1976)
- Kente 1 (1976)
- Kente 2 (1976)
- Kente 3 (1976)
- Kente 4 (1976)
- Widows Mask #1: Bena (1976)
- Widows Mask #2: Buba (1976)
- Widows Mask #3: Moma (1976)
- King Face Mask (1977)
- Queen Face Mask (1977)
- Little Girl Face Mask (1977)
- Nigerian Brocade Face Mask #1 (1976)
- Nigerian Brocade Face Mask #2 (1977)
- Nigerian Brocade Face Mask #3 (1977)
- Nigerian Brocade Face Mask #4 (1977)
- Nigerian Brocade Face Mask #5 (1977)

===== 1980s =====
- Mourning Mask (1985)

==== Sculptures ====
===== 2010s =====
- Obama We Love You (2012)
- Obama, Red, White and Blue (2013)

==== Soft sculptures ====
===== 1970s =====
- Wilt #1 (1974)
- Wilt #2 (1974)
- Wilt #3 (1974)
- Willa (1974)
- Wiltina (1974)
- Wilhemina (1974)
- Wedding Couple: Brenda, John, Michele and Frank (1974)
- Wedding Couple: Meecha and Cliff (1974)
- Wedding Couple: Bobbye and Arthur (1974)
- Jewel and George (1974)
- Imani and Syd (1974)
- Zora and Fish (1974)
- Woman on a Pedestal #1 (1977)
- Woman on a Pedestal #2 (1977)
- Woman on a Pedestal #3 (1977)
- Woman on a Pedestal #4 (1977)
- Woman on a Pedestal #5 (1977)
- Cherie (1977)
- Suzanne (1977)
- Evelyn (1977)
- Yvonne (1977)
- Kodu (1977)
- Granma (1977)
- Marcia (1977)
- Juanita, Eddie and Caron (1977)
- Bag Lady #1: Zora (1977)
- Bag Lady #2: Flossie (1977)
- Bad Lady #3: Minna (1977)
- Atlanta Children (1977)
- Atlanta Children: Save Our Children in Atlanta (1977)
- Atlanta Children: The Screaming Woman (1977)
- Turn Within #1 (1977)
- Turn Within #2 (1977)
- Buba Died (1977)
- Lucy: The 3.5 Million Year Old Lady (1977), Minneapolis Institute of Art
- Harlem 78: Daddy (1978)
- Harlem 78: Moma (1978)
- Harlem 78: Tina (1978)
- Flora (1978)
- Harlem 78: Zora (1978)
- Harlem 78: Ms. Martha (1978)
- Harlem 78: Booker (1978)
- Harlem 78: Sugar (1978)
- Harlem 78: Nat (1978)
- Harlem 78: Lena (1978)
- Harlem 78: Man and Woman (1978)
- Queen (1978)
- Ben (1978), Toledo Museum of Art, Ohio
- Little Joe (1978)

===== 1980s =====
- Three in a Bed (1986)
- The Wake and Resurrection of the Bicentennial Negro (1975-1989)

===== 1990s =====
- A Potion for the 21st Century (1999)

===== 2000s =====
- Our Ancestors: Andrew Louis Jones and Willi Posey Jones (My Parents) (2007)
- Our Ancestors: Benjamin Bunion and Ida Mae Posey (My Grandparents) (2007)
- Our Ancestors: Betsy Shannon (My Great-Grandmother) and Uncle Cardoza (2007)
- Our Ancestors: Bob and Susie Shannon (My Great-Great-Grandparents) (2007)

== Books ==
Lists of reprintings may not be complete.

=== Published books ===
- Tar Beach, New York: Crown Books for Young Readers, 1991 (1st ed.); Scholastic, 1992; Dragonfly Books (Crown), 1996; Follett Library Resources, 2002; Random House Children's Books, 2020. ISBN 978-0-517-88544-4
- Aunt Harriet's Underground Railroad in the Sky, New York: Crown Books for Young Readers, 1992 (1st ed.); Dragonfly Books, 1995. ISBN 978-0-517-88543-7
- Dinner at Aunt Connie's House, New York: Hyperion Books for Children, 1993. ISBN 978-0-590-13713-3
- We Flew Over The Bridge: Memoirs of Faith Ringgold, Boston: Bulfinch Press (Little, Brown and Company), 1995 (1st ed.); Durham, North Carolina: Duke University Press, 2005. ISBN 978-0-8223-3564-1
- Talking To Faith Ringgold by Faith Ringgold, Linda Freeman and Nancy Roucher, New York: Crown Books for Young Readers, 1996. ISBN 978-0-517-70914-6
- Bonjour, Lonnie, New York: Hyperion Books for Young Readers, 1996. ISBN 978-0-7868-0076-6
- My Dream of Martin Luther King, New York: Dragonfly Books, 1996. ISBN 978-0-517-88577-2
- The Invisible Princess, New York: Crown Books for Young Readers, 1998 (1st ed.); New York: Dragonfly Books, 2001. ISBN 978-0-440-41735-4
- If a Bus Could Talk: The Story of Rosa Parks, New York: Simon & Schuster Books for Young People, 1999 (1st ed.); Aladdin Books (Simon & Schuster), 2001. ISBN 978-0-689-85676-1
- Counting to Tar Beach: A Tar Beach Board Book, New York: Crown Books for Young Readers, 1999. ISBN 978-0-517-80022-5
- Cassie's Colorful Day: A Tar Beach Board Book, New York: Crown Books for Young Readers, 1999. ISBN 978-0-517-80021-8
- Cassie's Word Quilt, New York: Knopf Books for Young Readers, 2002 (1st ed.); Dragonfly Books, 2004; Random House Children's Books, 2012. ISBN 978-0-553-11233-7
- Faith Ringgold: A View from the Studio by Curlee Raven Holton and Faith Ringgold, Boston: Bunker Hill Publishing in association with the Allentown Art Museum, 2004. ISBN 9781593731786
- O Holy Night: Christmas with the Boys Choir of Harlem, New York: Amistad (HarperCollins), 2004. ISBN 978-1-4223-5512-1
- What Will You Do for Peace? Impact of 9/11 on New York City Youth, introduction by Faith Ringgold, Hamden, Connecticut: InterRelations Collaborative, 2004. ISBN 978-0-9761753-0-8
- The Three Witches by Zora Neale Hurston, adapted by Joyce Carol Thomas, illustrated by Faith Ringgold, New York: HarperCollins, 2006. ISBN 978-0-06-000649-5
- Bronzeville Boys and Girls (poetry) by Gwendolyn Brooks, illustrated by Faith Ringgold, New York: Amistad, 2007 (1st ed.); HarperCollins, 2015. ISBN 978-3948318130
- Henry Ossawa Tanner: His Boyhood Dream Comes True, Piermont, New Hampshire: Bunker Hill Publishing in association with the Pennsylvania Academy of the Fine Arts, 2011. ISBN 9781593730925
- Harlem Renaissance Party, New York: Amistad, 2015. ISBN 0060579110
- A Letter to my Daughter, Michele: in response to her book, Black Macho and the Myth of the Superwoman, North Charleston, South Carolina: CreateSpace Independent Publishing Platform, 2015 (written 1980). ISBN 9781517572662
- We Came to America, New York: Knopf, 2016 (1st ed.); Dragonfly Books, 2022. ISBN 978-0-593-48270-4
- Faith Ringgold: Politics / Power by Faith Ringgold, Michele Wallace, and Kirsten Weiss, Berlin: Weiss Publications, 2022. ISBN 394-831813-1

=== Artist's books ===
- The French Collection Story Quilts, New York: B MOW Press, 1992.
- 7 Passages to a Flight, San Diego: Brighton Press, 1995.
- How The People Became Color Blind Coloring Book, 1999
- Coming to Jones Road. Part 1, Englewood, New Jersey: Good Stuff Press, 2000.
- 911 Freedom Flag Stories, 2001
- Jazz Stories Song Book, 2004
- Here Is The Sky Where Are You?, 2004
- A Letter To My Daughter and Granddaughters, 2006
- MLK A Letter from Birmingham Jail by Faith Ringgold, afterword by C.T. Vivian, New York: Limited Editions Club, 2007.
- Declaration of Freedom and Independence, 2008
- Bully Bully Color and Drawing Book, 2012

== Citations and references ==
=== Cited references ===
- Gioni, Massimiliano; Carrion-Murayari, Gary (2022). Faith Ringgold: American People. London / New York: Phaidon Press / New Museum. ISBN 9781838664220.
- Williams, Raymond. "A Finding Aid to the Faith Ringgold Study Room Collection, 1948-2016" (May 1, 2017) [Finding aid]. Faith Ringgold Study Room Collection, 1948-2016. College Park, Maryland: David C. Driskell Center, University of Maryland, College Park.
