= The American Collection (Ringgold) =

Quilt series by Faith Ringgold

- #4: Jo Baker's Bananas (1997) at the National Museum of Women in the Arts in 2023
- Artist: Faith Ringgold
- Year: 1997
- Medium: Acrylic on canvas, quilt art
- Location: National Museum of Women in the Arts, Washington, D.C.
- Preceded by: The French Collection (1991-1997)

The American Collection is a series of eleven quilt paintings by American artist Faith Ringgold, completed in 1997, with an additional unfinished quilt that the artist sketched but did not complete. The series serves as a continuation of the narrative the artist began in her earlier series of quilt paintings The French Collection (1991-1997). While the quilts in The French Collection included detailed narratives written in text along the edges of each quilt, The American Collection quilts do not include stories in text and are meant to be understood as paintings by Marlena Simone, the daughter of the fictional central character from the earlier series.

The American Collection is a prominent example of Ringgold's artistic engagements and debates with the aesthetics, philosophies, and key figures of modernist art.

== History ==
Ringgold began working on The American Collection quilts as she was finishing The French Collection. The series was first exhibited in partial form in Ringgold's exhibition Dancing at the Louvre (1998-1999), originating at the New Museum in New York. The series has only been exhibited in full one time, at Ringgold's retrospective American People (2022), also originating at the New Museum.

== Descriptions and locations ==
Each quilt is made with acrylic paint on canvas, bordered by patterned fabric; they do not contain written text like the previous quilt series. The quilts continue the story of Willia Marie Simone and her descendants that Ringgold began in The French Collection. The American Collection focuses on Willia Marie's daughter Marlena who, after being raised by her mother's Aunt Melissa in Harlem while her mother was living as an artist in Europe, becomes an artist herself. Ringgold's daughter described the conceit of the series:

The American Collection was intended to be composed of twelve pieces, one of which was never completed and all of which were to be understood as paintings done by Marlena, Willia Marie's adult daughter, as a successful Black woman artist living in the United States. She should be regarded as a doppel-ganger for Faith, living and working in roughly the same time frame but more successful, possibly because she has no husband and children.

— Michele Wallace, "Dancing at the Louvre", Faith Ringgold: American People (2022)

Five quilts are now located in public collections across the United States, and six remain in private collections.

=== #1: We Came to America ===
We Came to America depicts the Statue of Liberty as a Black woman holding a small child, surrounded in the water by escaped formerly enslaved people. The flame on the statue's torch has been mostly extinguished. The people in the water are flailing and screaming while a slave ship burns far in the background. Ringgold's daughter has noted that the Statue of Liberty was not constructed until several decades after the Civil War and nearly a century after the end of legal importation of enslaved people, meaning this scene contains not only an alternate version of the statue, but also an alternate version of history.

We Came to America is in the collection of the Pennsylvania Academy of the Fine Arts, Philadelphia.

=== #2: A Family Portrait ===
A Family Portrait depicts Aunt Melissa with Marlena standing at her feet and Marlena's brother Pierrot sitting on her lap. Willia Marie and her French husband are depicted in paintings on the wall behind the family. Nearly every member of the family has a different skin tone, as the family is multiracial.

As of 2022, A Family Portrait was in the private collection of economist William Landes and Elisabeth M. Landes.

=== #3: Born on a Cotton Field ===
Born on a Cotton Field depicts an enslaved man and woman cradling a baby in a cotton field while a massive surreal Black male figure stands above them with impossibly long arms wrapping around the family. Over two dozen faces of other enslaved people are partly visible, hidden amongst the cotton in the field. Ringgold later used this scene in her children's book The Invisible Princess (1999).

As of 2022, Born on a Cotton Field was in a private collection.

=== #4: Jo Baker's Bananas ===
Jo Baker's Bananas depicts Marlena and her brother Pierrot standing in front of Marlena's painting of the American-born French performer Josephine Baker. Baker is depicted in five different dance poses, wearing her signature stage outfit of no clothes apart from a skirt made of bananas and a layered necklace. The scene takes place at the Museum of Modern Art for an opening of an exhibition of Marlena's paintings. Two jazz musicians are pictured performing at the opening.

Jo Baker's Bananas is in the collection of the National Museum of Women in the Arts, Washington, D.C.

=== #5: Bessie's Blues ===
Bessie's Blues depicts the face of blues singer Bessie Smith repeated 20 times in a square grid, rendered with a deep blue skin and with features and hair of varying shades of orange, peach, and yellow. Smith appears to be singing in the images, which are arranged and colored in the style of Andy Warhol's signature repetitive portraits like Marilyn Diptych (1962).

Bessie's Blues is in the collection of the Art Institute of Chicago.

=== #6: The Flag is Bleeding #2 ===
The Flag is Bleeding #2 depicts three figures standing within the confines of a bloody American flag. A Black woman stands in the left of the flag with several bleeding wounds on her chest and tears of blood streaming from her eyes. She is embracing her two young children who stand naked at her feet, hugging her legs over her dress. Ringgold was inspired by her earlier painting The American People Series #18: The Flag is Bleeding (1967), which similarly depicts a group of people standing inside a bloody flag, but did not include any Black women.

The Flag is Bleeding #2 is in the collection of Glenstone, Potomac, Maryland.

=== #7: Stompin at the Savoy (unfinished) ===
Ringgold sketched several compositions for Stompin at the Savoy but ultimately did not complete the quilt.

=== #8: Cotton Fields, Sunflowers, Blackbirds and Quilting Bees ===
Cotton Fields, Sunflowers, Blackbirds, and Quilting Bees depicts a group of Black women sitting in a field full of cotton plants and sunflowers with several flocks of black birds flying in the distance. The figures are quilting together, creating a large checkerboard pattern quilt with dozens of sunflowers. This quilt is a direct reinterpretation of Ringgold's earlier quilt Sunflowers Quilting Bee at Arles (1991), from The French Collection. Ringgold's daughter has referred to it as a "replacement" for the earlier quilt, which was purchased by Oprah Winfrey.

As of 2022, Cotton Fields, Sunflowers, Blackbirds and Quilting Bees was in a private collection.

=== #9: The Two Jemimas ===
The Two Jemimas depicts two Black women standing side by side, rendered with grotesquely over-sized proportions and features. The figures are wearing embroidered orange dresses and pearls, with skin ranging from deep blue to grayish black. The two women are meant to be portraits of the blackface minstrel show character and longtime pancake syrup brand mascot Aunt Jemima. Ringgold drew inspiration for the figures from Willem de Kooning's style of painting female figures, in particular his Woman and Two Women series.

The Two Jemimas is in the collection of Glenstone, Potomac, Maryland.

=== #10: Wanted: Douglass, Tubman, and Truth ===
Wanted depicts the abolitionists and activists Frederick Douglass, Harriet Tubman, and Sojourner Truth standing together in a verdant forest. Ringgold was inspired to create the work after wondering whether the three figures had met one another.

As of 2022, Wanted: Douglass, Tubman, and Truth was in a private collection.

=== #11: Picnic on the Grass Alone ===
Picnic on the Grass Alone depicts Marlena sitting alone at a picnic in the forest, having been stood up by a man for a date.

As of 2022, Picnic on the Grass Alone was in the private collection of investment manager Eddie C. Brown and C. Sylvia Brown.

=== #12: Listen to the Trees ===
Listen to the Trees, like Picnic on the Grass Alone, depicts Marlena alone in the forest. She is holding a bouquet of wildflowers and looking toward a stream surrounded by dense foliage. Ringgold's daughter has written that Marlena, unlike her mother Willia Marie, is depicted as financially successful but ultimately single and without children, reflecting the artist's ongoing meditations on the impact having children has on the career of women artists.

As of 2022, Listen to the Trees was in a private collection.

== Reception and analysis ==
Reviewing Ringgold's 1998 exhibition at the New Museum, critic Grace Glueck wrote in The New York Times that "the American quilts -- without the customary narrative borders -- are starker, harder hitting and more strikingly composed than [The French Collection]."

Critic Hettie Judah, writing in The Guardian about Ringgold's 2019 retrospective at the Serpentine Galleries, said that quilts from the series "recall the violence on which the US was constructed, and with which a dominant power structure is maintained." Writing in The Art Newspaper about Ringgold's 2022 retrospective at the New Museum, critic Charles Moore called the series Ringgold's "most complex" quilts, and described Born in a Cotton Field as "emotionally charged," and "intimate."

== See also ==
- List of works by Faith Ringgold

== Citations and references ==
=== Cited references ===
- Gioni, Massimiliano; Carrion-Murayari, Gary (2022). Faith Ringgold: American People. New York / London: New Museum / Phaidon Press. ISBN 9781838664220.
- Wallace, Michele (2022). "Dancing at the Louvre". In Gioni, Massimiliano; Carrion-Murayari, Gary (eds.). Faith Ringgold: American People (1st ed.). New York / London: New Museum / Phaidon Press. pp. 174–183. ISBN 978-1-83866-422-0.
