= Who's Afraid of Aunt Jemima? =

Quilt artwork by Faith Ringgold

- Who's Afraid of Aunt Jemima? at Glenstone in 2026
- Artist: Faith Ringgold
- Year: 1983
- Medium: Acrylic on canvas, quilt art
- Movement: Black Arts Movement, Black feminism, Feminist art
- Dimensions: 229 cm × 203 cm (90 in × 80 in)
- Location: Glenstone, Potomac, Maryland

Who's Afraid of Aunt Jemima? is an acrylic on canvas narrative quilt made by American artist Faith Ringgold in 1983. Named for the Edward Albee play Who's Afraid of Virginia Woolf? and the character Aunt Jemima, the work is Ringgold's first story quilt and marks the early stages of the artist's shift from oil painting to quilting.

== Description ==
Who's Afraid of Aunt Jemima? is a quilt work made with acrylic paint and consists of 56 square panels, bordered by patterned fabric. 28 panels contain paintings of people, 18 panels contain designs of patterned fabric, and 10 panels contain text, including the center panel which contains the title of the work.

The text in the work tells the life story of a fictional Black woman from New Orleans named Jemima Blakey and her descendants and their families. Ringgold based the story on the lives of her aunts and named the character after the blackface minstrel show character and longtime pancake syrup brand mascot Aunt Jemima. The story of Jemima Blakey's life as a business owner, independent thinker, and strong matriarch is in distinct contrast to the Aunt Jemima character, "the most maligned Black female stereotype." The text includes numerous references to the various figures painted in the work, 15 of which are labeled with letters and names to correspond with characters from the story.

== History ==
The work was first shown at Ringgold's solo exhibition at the Studio Museum in Harlem in 1984 and is the first of her extensive portfolio of story quilts, though not her first work of quilt art. Ringgold has said she began making these narrative quilts with extensive text after being unable to find a publisher that would accept her autobiography. She began quilting so that "when my quilts were hung up to look at, or photographed for a book, people could still read my stories."

The work was acquired by Glenstone in Potomac, Maryland.

== Reception ==
Critic Benjamin Genocchio described the work in The New York Times as "visually beautiful" and "filled with moments of wry or bitter comedy." Writing in Tank about the work's showing in a 2019 exhibition at the Serpentine Galleries, Sarah Muttardi said the piece "[breaks] down the racist stereotype that [Black] women lacked drive or business acumen," and shows Ringgold's "disdain for the lack of positive images of Black women in contemporary media and art." Writing in The New Yorker, critic Julian Lucas called the work "magnificent" and said it "elevates the figure of stereotype into the matriarch of a sprawling clan."

== See also ==
- List of works by Faith Ringgold
