= Tar Beach =

1991 picture book by Faith Ringgold

- Author: Faith Ringgold
- Illustrator: Faith Ringgold
- Cover artist: Faith Ringgold
- Language: English
- Genre: Children's literature
- Publisher: Crown Publishers, Inc.
- Publication date: hardcover 1991; paperback 1996
- Publication place: United States
- Pages: 32pp
- ISBN: 9780517885444

Tar Beach, written and illustrated by Faith Ringgold, is a children's picture book published by Crown Publishers, Inc., 1991. Tar Beach, Ringgold's first book, was a Caldecott Honor Book for 1992.

== Plot summary ==
The book is set in New York in 1939. Tar Beach is the roof of Cassie's Harlem apartment building. Cassie feels an affinity for the George Washington Bridge, which opened the day she was born and which she sees from her rooftop. Her dearest dream is to be free to go wherever she wants, and one day it comes true when the stars help her to fly across the city and over the bridge.

== Analysis ==
Children’s literature scholar Jonda C. McNair describes how Tar Beach is unique in its use of literary innovations, particularly its combination of various artforms such as quilt making, autobiography, and painting. As Ringgold said in an interview with cultural critic and daughter Michele Wallace, Tar Beach was not written for children but rather to recall the essence of childhood and invoke the memories associated with it.

== Awards ==
For Tar Beach, Ringgold won the Ezra Jack Keats New Writer Award and the Coretta Scott King Award for Illustration. She was also the runner-up for the Caldecott Medal, the premier American Library Association award for picture book illustration. Tar Beach was also a New York Times Best Illustrated Book and winner of the Parents' Choice Gold Award.

== Related artwork ==
Tar Beach 2 is what Faith Ringgold refers to as a story quilt.

== In media ==
On October 21, 2016, author Ringgold read her book on film for NPR. On May 12, 2012, in a video for the Threads episode of Craft In America: PBS Documentary Series & Museum, Ringgold explained her artistic and technical process as well as her inspiration for creating Tar Beach's illustrations, which were original textile pieces photographically reproduced for the book.

== See also ==
- List of works by Faith Ringgold
