= The French Collection =

Quilt series by Faith Ringgold

- Part I, #4: Sunflowers Quilting Bee at Arles at the New Museum in New York in 2022
- Artist: Faith Ringgold
- Year: 1991
- Medium: Acrylic on canvas, quilt art
- Followed by: The American Collection (1997)

The French Collection is a series of twelve quilt paintings by American artist Faith Ringgold completed between 1991 and 1997. Divided into two parts composed of eight and four quilts each, the series utilizes Ringgold's distinct style of story quilts to tell the fictional story of a young African American woman in the 1920s, Willia Marie Simone, who leaves Harlem for Paris to live as an artist and model. The stories, illustrated in acrylic paint and written in ink surrounding the paintings, narrate Willia Marie's journey as she befriends famous artists, performers, writers, and activists (many of whom would not have lived during the era or in the region), runs a café and works as a painter, and develops a distinct Black feminist intellectual worldview based on her experiences and identity. Willia Marie's interactions with notable modernist artists and their oeuvres are an archetypical example of Ringgold's responses to the predominantly white male artistic canon, wherein she often directly invoked, embraced, and challenged the central figures of modernist art.

Exhibited as a full set for the first time in 1998, five of the quilts are now located in public museums and galleries across the United States while the remaining seven are in private collections. The French Collection quilts are among Ringgold's most well-known works and have been extensively reproduced as prints, posters, and in popular media. Ringgold continued the narrative begun in this series with The American Collection (1997).

== History ==
Ringgold began working on The French Collection in 1990 and finished the bulk of the series in 1991. #10: Jo Baker's Birthday; #11: Le Café des Artistes; and #12: Moroccan Holiday were completed later, in 1993, 1994, and 1997, respectively. Ringgold traveled extensively in the early 1990s throughout France for visual inspiration using funding from her employer, the University of California, San Diego, as well as from the National Endowment for the Arts. Her travels included a three-month residency at La Napoule Art Foundation in Mandelieu-la-Napoule, where she first began her paintings. Artist Denise Mumm assisted with the quilting process and Lisa Yi, then Ringgold's assistant in New York, copied the written stories onto the works.

The twelve quilts were exhibited together for the first time at Ringgold's show Dancing at the Louvre (1998–1999), originating at the New Museum in New York. The collection has only been exhibited together one time since the original showing, at Ringgold's retrospective Faith Ringgold: American People (2022), also originating at the New Museum.

Ringgold continued the narrative begun in The French Collection in a second series of quilts, The American Collection (1997), which are meant to be understood as paintings by Willia Marie's daughter Marlena and do not include full stories in text.

== Descriptions and locations ==
Each quilt is made with acrylic paint on canvas, patterned fabric, and text written in ink on canvas. The quilts tell the narrative of Willia Marie Simone, a 16-year-old African American girl who is moving from Harlem, New York, to Paris, in 1920 to paint and model. Willia Marie's Aunt Melissa gives her $500 for the journey and eventually agrees to care for her children, and they exchange letters over the course of her time in Europe. Ringgold's daughter has described the quilts and stories in The French Collection:

How Willia Marie's life subsequently unfolds, rendering her ultimately a successful expatriate Black woman artist living in France, is explained in an elliptical series of stories, most but not all of which are presented in the form of letters home to Aunt Melissa. These narratives, which are handwritten on the quilts, are paired with a series of images designed to provide a visual presentation of Willia Marie's progress.

— Michele Wallace, "Dancing at the Louvre", Faith Ringgold: American People (2022)

While five of the quilts are located in public collections and a number of the quilts are owned by noted public figures, some are owned by unknown private collections and may be in the collection of the artist's estate or gallery.

=== Part I, #1: Dancing at the Louvre (1991) ===
Dancing at the Louvre depicts Willia Marie and a stylish Black woman whose three daughters in colorful dresses are dancing happily in an art gallery at the Louvre. Several paintings are rendered on the wall behind the figures, including the Mona Lisa. In the written text, Willia Marie writes to her Aunt Melissa about a friend named Marcia (the pictured woman), who scolded Willia Marie for not bringing her children with her to Europe. Ringgold modeled Marcia and her children on the artist's own children in real life, whom she did not bring to Europe with her on her trips for inspiration for the series.

Dancing at the Louvre is in the collection of the Gund Gallery, Kenyon College, Gambier, Ohio.

=== Part I, #2: Wedding on the Seine (1991) ===
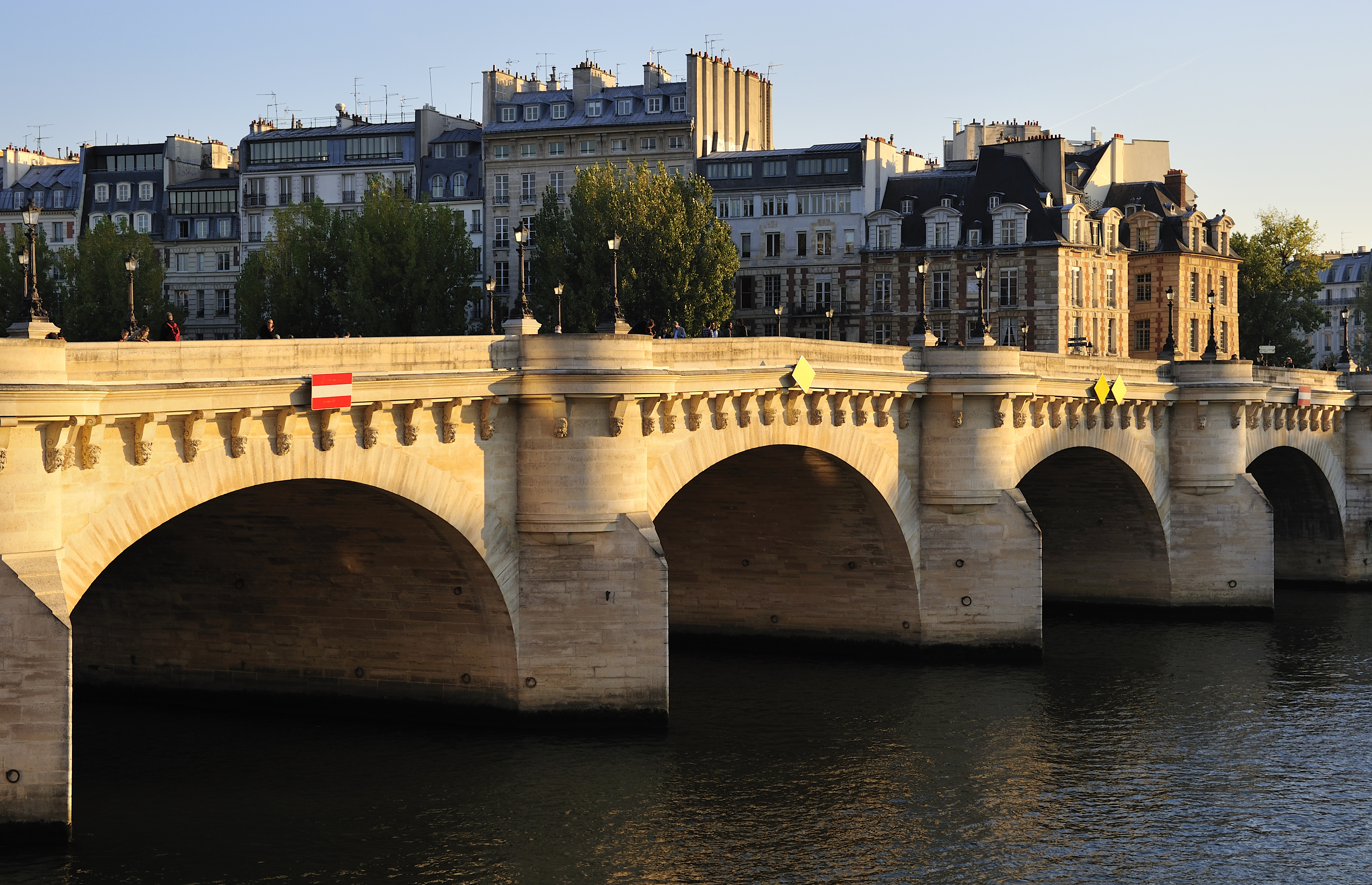
The Pont Neuf bridge in Paris

Wedding on the Seine depicts Willia Marie in a wedding dress, running across the Pont Neuf bridge over the Seine in Paris. The Île de la Cité and architecture of the city are visible behind her and tower over Willia Marie as she throws a bouquet into the river. The text provides background information about Willia Marie's marriage: she fears that marriage and children will harm her artistic career, but her wealthy French husband died after they were married for three years.

As of 2022, Wedding on the Seine was in a private collection.

=== Part I, #3: The Picnic at Giverny (1991) ===
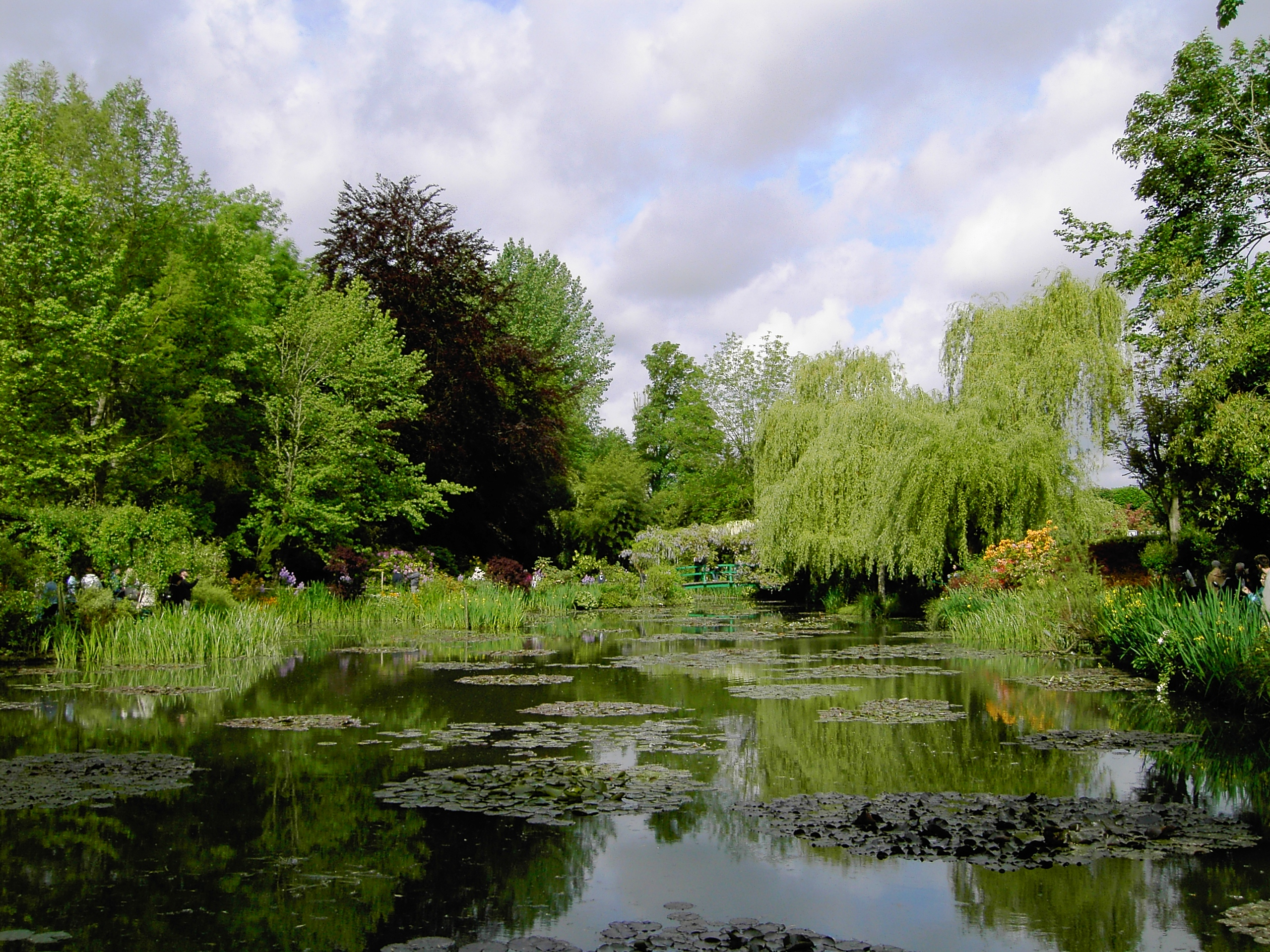
A pond at Giverny

Picnic at Giverny depicts Willia Marie painting a portrait of a group of brightly dressed women standing and sitting at a picnic in front of a pond at Giverny, in addition to the artist Pablo Picasso who is posing nude on the ground wearing a hat, looking over his shoulder at the viewer. The women are various real-life patrons and artistic supporters of Ringgold's, including the artist Emma Amos. In the text, Willia Marie writes to her Aunt Melissa that she was invited to Giverny - Claude Monet's home at the time - to paint a portrait, and based the portrait on Édouard Manet's painting Le Déjeuner sur l'herbe (1893). Willia Marie tells her Aunt that the inclusion of the elderly, naked Picasso was a reversal of the Manet work, in which the men are clothed and the women are naked. She also tells her Aunt that instead of painting strictly about the social ills of her time, she wants to paint things that will inspire and liberate her audience.

As of 2022, The Picnic at Giverny was in the private collection of financier Eric S. Dobkin and his wife Barbara Dobkin.

=== Part I, #4: Sunflowers Quilting Bee at Arles (1991) ===
Sunflowers Quilting Bee at Arles depicts a group of famous African American women creating a quilt patterned with sunflowers, while sitting in a field of sunflowers in Arles. The women are being approached by the artist Vincent van Gogh holding a vase filled with flowers and seem disturbed by his arrival. The women portrayed are Sojourner Truth, Harriet Tubman, Madam C. J. Walker, Ida B. Wells, Mary McLeod Bethune, Fannie Lou Hamer, Rosa Parks, and Ella Baker, who comprise the fictional National Sunflower Quilters Society of America. In the text, Willia Marie describes her conversations with the women, who are touring the world making quilts. They describe themselves as all artists and tell her that when they are finished quilting, they can move on to the "real art" of working toward a better world.

Sunflowers Quilting Bee at Arles was originally made while Ringgold was creating other works commissioned by Oprah Winfrey. Ringgold included historical Black women in the painting that Winfrey admired and Winfrey subsequently purchased it. As of 2022, the work was still in Winfrey's private collection. In 2024, the work was exhibited for sale at the art fair EXPO Chicago, presented by Ringgold's then art dealer ACA Galleries.

=== Part I, #5: Matisse's Model (1991) ===
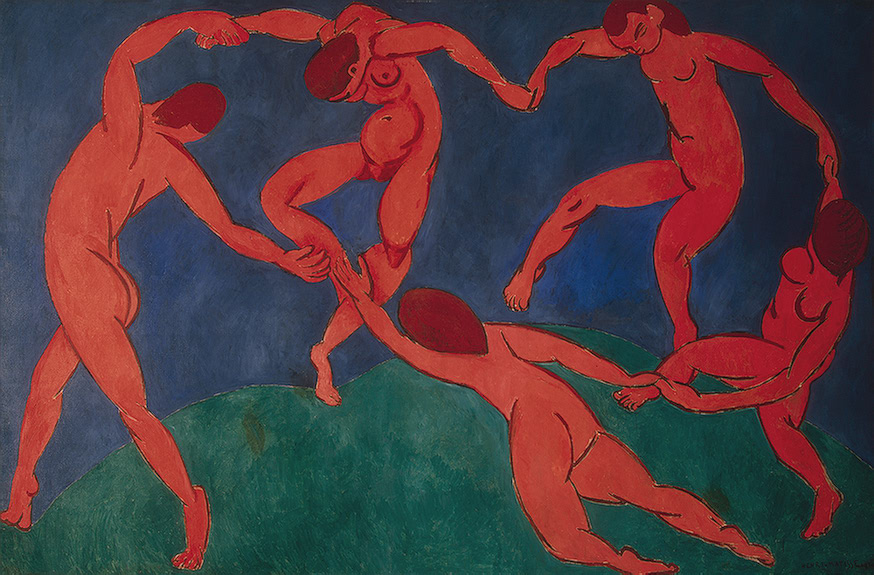
Henri Matisse's Dance (1910)

Matisse's Model depicts Willia Marie reclining nude, modeling for the artist Henri Matisse who is standing in the corner holding a paint palette. Above Willia Marie, Matisse's painting Dance (1910) hangs on the wall. The version of Dance depicted is the version owned by the State Hermitage Museum in Saint Petersburg, Russia, which uses a darker red paint than the version owned by the Museum of Modern Art in New York. In the text, Willia Marie reflects on race and beauty standards for Black women.

Matisse's Model is in the collection of the Baltimore Museum of Art.

=== Part I, #6: Matisse's Chapel (1991) ===
Matisse's Chapel depicts a large group of Black elders, parents, and children sitting and standing inside the Chapelle du Rosaire de Vence, a chapel elaborately decorated with artworks by Henri Matisse and often referred to as the Matisse Chapel. The group are all deceased members of Ringgold's real family, including her mother, known to the family as Momma Jones, and her great-grandmother, Betsy Bingham. In the text, Willia Marie tells her Aunt that the scene is from a dream where her ancestors gathered in the chapel and spoke with her. In the dream, Betsy tells Willia Marie a story about meeting a white man who tried to shame her for being the descendant of enslaved people. Betsy rebuffed the man by asking him if he was ashamed of being the descendant of slavers. The man recounted a family story involving his grandparents, slavers from South Carolina, who had recoiled at the scent of bodies emanating from a slave ship in distress that they passed on a boat journey, only for their own boat to catch fire, forcing them to inhale the scent more deeply as they struggled to breathe amid the smoke.

As of 2022, Matisse's Chapel was in a private collection.

=== Part I, #7: Picasso's Studio (1991) ===
Pablo Picasso's Les Demoiselles d'Avignon (1907)

Picasso's Studio depicts Willia Marie posing nude for the artist Pablo Picasso with his painting Les Demoiselles d'Avignon (1907) hanging behind her. Picasso is elderly, the age he would have been during Ringgold's early career, but much older than he would have been when painting Les Demoiselles. In the text, Willia Marie tells her Aunt that the women and African masks in the Picasso painting began to have a conversation during her visit, encouraging Willia Marie to embrace her identities as both a Black person and a woman. Willia Marie also tells her Aunt that while Picasso "has the power to deny" the African inspirations in his art, it "doesn’t matter what he says about where it comes from. We see where, every time we look in the mirror.”

Picasso's Studio is in the collection of the Worcester Art Museum, Massachusetts.

=== Part I, #8: On the Beach at St. Tropez (1991) ===
On the Beach at St. Tropez depicts Willia Marie laying on a beach in Saint-Tropez with her son Pierrot, surrounded by other families and beachgoers. In the text, Willia Marie has a conversation with Pierrot about why she chose to stay in France to be an artist rather than raise him. The conversation is gentle and warm, and Pierrot accepts her explanation. Ringgold did not have any sons, and her daughter Michele Wallace has said this story reflects the artist's belief that relationships between mothers and sons are supposedly calmer than those between mothers and daughters.

As of 2022, On the Beach at St. Tropez was in the private collection of Patricia Blanchet and her late husband, television broadcaster Ed Bradley.

=== Part II, #9: Dinner at Gertrude Stein's (1991) ===
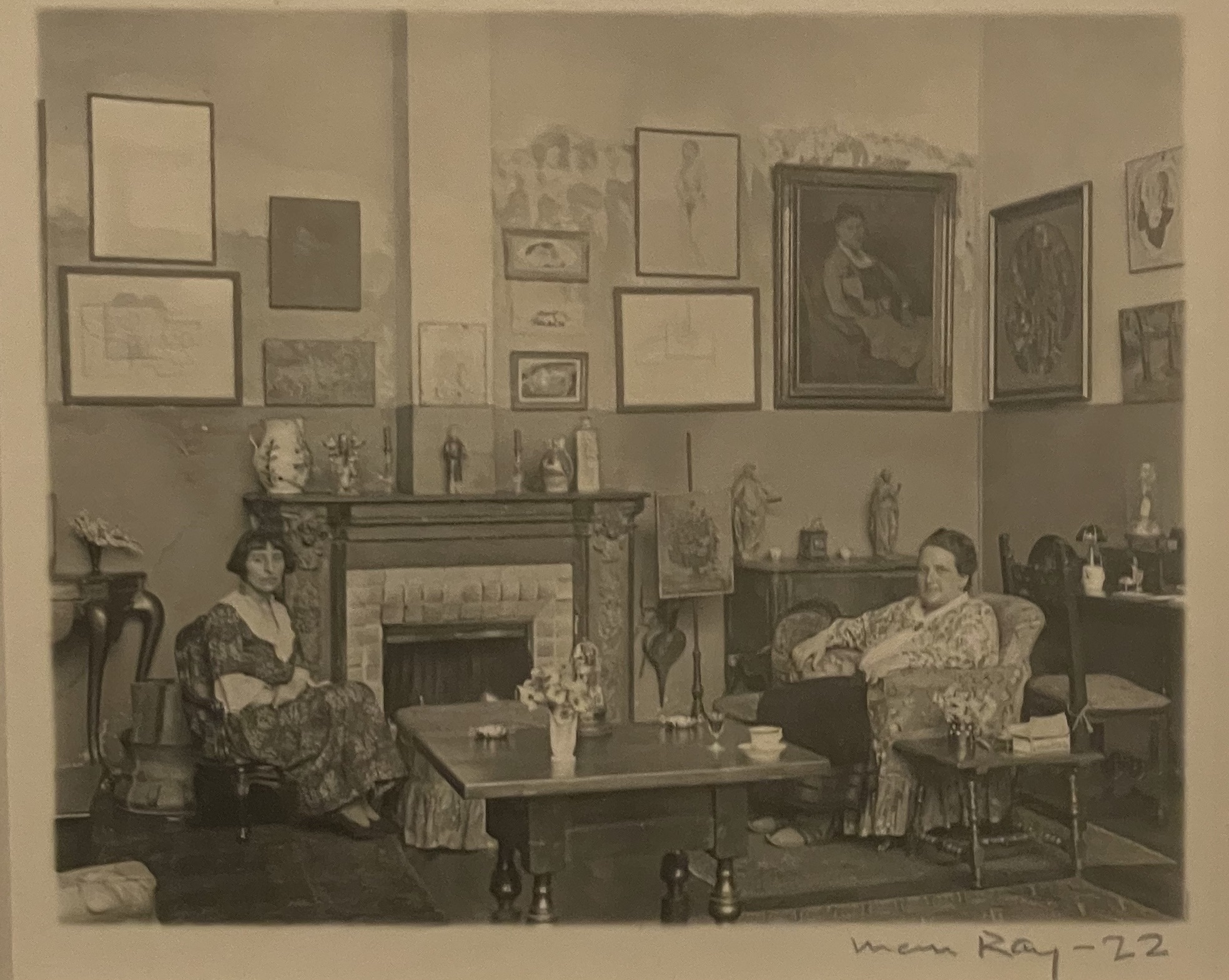
Gertrude Stein and her partner Alice B. Toklas, photographed in 1922 in Stein's salon

Dinner at Gertrude Stein's depicts Willia Marie and a group of writers and artists sitting at dinner in Gertrude Stein's salon in Paris. Seated around the table are James Baldwin, Ernest Hemingway, Langston Hughes, Zora Neale Hurston, Pablo Picasso, Richard Wright, and Stein herself along with her partner Alice B. Toklas and brother Leo Stein. Several paintings are rendered on the wall in the salon, including Picasso's Portrait of Gertrude Stein (1905–1906) and works by Henri Matisse, Paul Cézanne, and Marie Laurencin. In the text, Willia Marie tells her Aunt about the dinner, the discussions she had with the attendees, and her views on Stein's salon gatherings.

In 2024 Dinner at Gertrude Stein's was sold at auction from the collection of Muriel Weithorn and her late husband Stanley Weithorn, to an unknown private collection.

=== Part II, #10: Jo Baker's Birthday (1993) ===
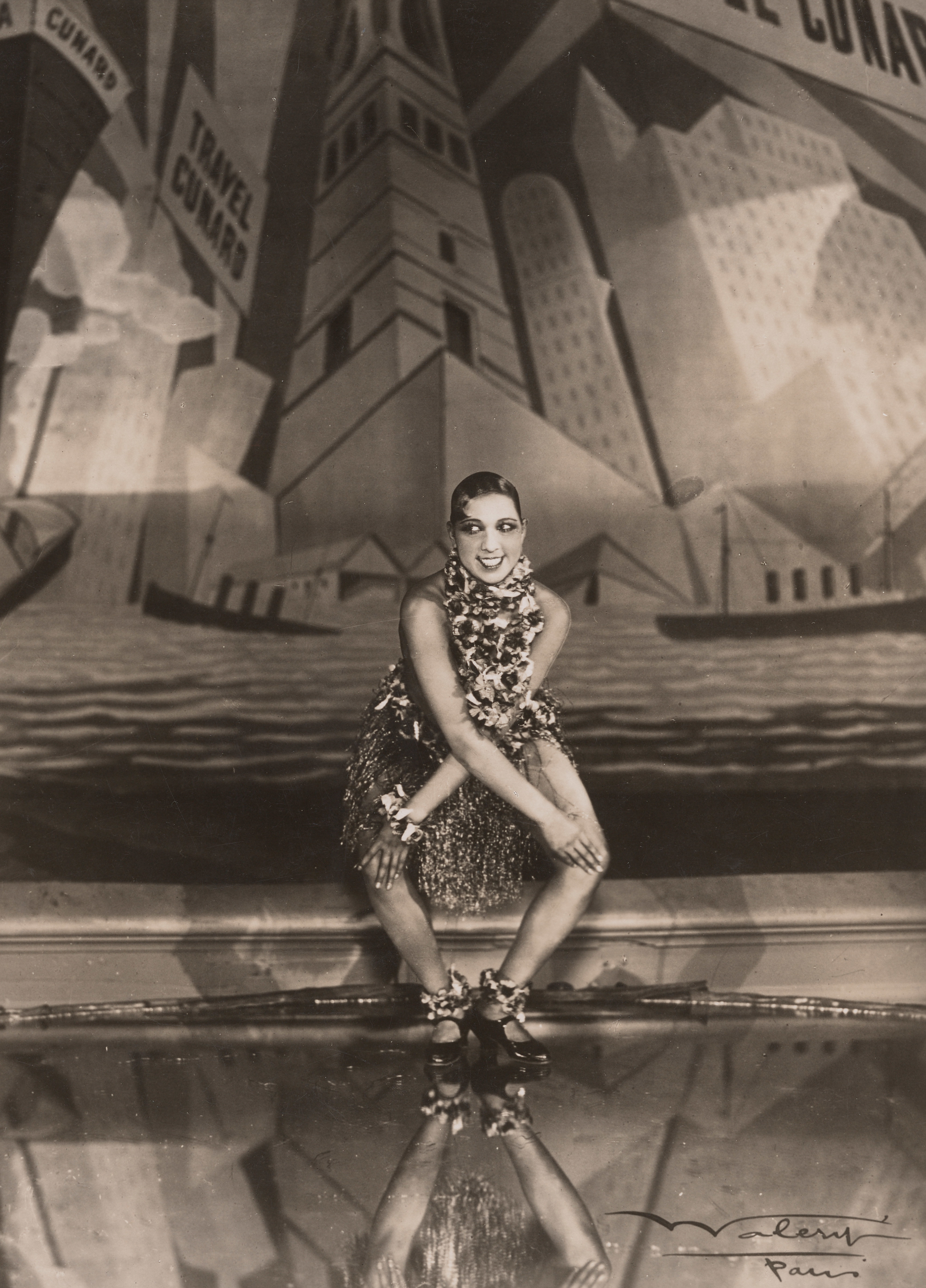
Performer Josephine Baker, photographed in 1926

Jo Baker's Birthday depicts the American-born French performer Josephine Baker in a lounge chair with her breasts partially exposed, posing similarly to the titled figure in Édouard Manet's painting Olympia (1863). The image of Baker combines elements from the Manet painting and includes a rendering of a portion of Henri Matisse's The Dessert: Harmony in Red (The Red Room) (1908). In the text, Willia Marie tells her Aunt that she was commissioned to paint a portrait of Baker, whom she admires as a Black woman controlling her own artistic image and pursuits.

Jo Baker's Birthday is in the collection of the Saint Louis Art Museum.

=== Part II, #11: Le Café des Artistes (1994) ===
Le Café des Artistes depicts Willia Marie standing among a large group of artists, writers, and public figures who are seated outside her café, Le Café des Artistes, in Paris. The figures depicted are Romare Bearden, Elizabeth Catlett, Ed Clark, Aaron Douglas, William H. Johnson, Sargent Johnson, Loïs Mailou Jones, Paul Gauguin, Vincent van Gogh, Jacob Lawrence, Edmonia Lewis, Archibald Motley, Raymond Saunders, Augusta Savage, Henry Ossawa Tanner, Henri de Toulouse-Lautrec, Maurice Utrillo, and Meta Vaux Warrick Fuller. Ringgold also included a portrait of herself among the group. In the text, Willia Marie tells her Aunt that by owning the café and inviting artists to commune with her, she is learning and thriving. But she expresses a need to ultimately draw creativity and inspiration from sources in Africa.

As of 2021, Le Café des Artistes was in the private collection of Juanita Vanoy Jordan, the ex-wife of retired professional basketball player Michael Jordan.

=== Part II, #12: Moroccan Holiday (1997) ===
Moroccan Holiday is the final work in the series and depicts Willia Marie and her daughter Marlena having a conversation in front of portraits of Frederick Douglass, Marcus Garvey, Malcolm X, and Martin Luther King Jr. In the text, Willia Marie tells Marlena that had she been born a man, she would have been a hero like the men portrayed. Marlena tells her mother that her Aunt Melissa is actually a hero, as she raised Marlena when Willia Marie left for France. Marlena vows to eventually raise her own children herself in addition to becoming an artist, though she does not end up marrying or having children in the narrative that continues in The American Collection. The title of Moroccan Holiday is derived from a trip that Ringgold took to find a location that felt emotionally resonant enough to serve as the backdrop of the conversation between Willia Marie and Marlena. Although Ringgold visited Morocco and considered it as a location, she settled on the portraits of noted African American activists as the background.

Moroccan Holiday is in the collection of the Norton Museum of Art, Palm Beach, Florida.

== Reception ==
In a 1998 review in The New York Times of Ringgold's show Dancing at the Louvre at the New Museum, Grace Glueck called the series "poignantly witty" and praised its "vivid sense of history" and "audacious imagination." In a 1999 review in The Washington Post of the Baltimore Museum of Art's showing of Dancing at the Louvre, Michael O'Sullivan praised the series, describing the quilts as "not bedclothes at all but idiosyncratic documents," further noting that the quilts "take fine art off the gallery wall and throw it back on the laps of the common man."

== See also ==
- List of works by Faith Ringgold

== Citations and references ==
=== Cited references ===
- Wallace, Michele (2022). "Dancing at the Louvre". In Gioni, Massimiliano; Carrion-Murayari, Gary (eds.). Faith Ringgold: American People (1st ed.). New York / London: New Museum / Phaidon Press. pp. 174–183. ISBN 9781838664220. OCLC 1295108502.
- Gioni, Massimiliano; Carrion-Murayari, Gary, eds. (2022). Faith Ringgold: American People. New York / London: New Museum / Phaidon Press. ISBN 9781838664220. OCLC 1295108502.
