= Street Story Quilt =

Painting by Faith Ringgold

- Artist: Faith Ringgold
- Year: 1985
- Medium: Acrylic, ink marker, dyed fabric, and sequins on canvas, sewn to quilted fabric
- Dimensions: 228.6 cm × 365.8 cm (90.0 in × 144.0 in)
- Location: Metropolitan Museum of Art, New York

Street Story Quilt is a 1985 painting by Faith Ringgold. It is in the collection of the Metropolitan Museum of Art (the Met) in New York City. It is one of many pieces in a body of work of story quilts created by Ringgold.

This work is a triptych consisting of three canvases sewed onto quilts. The painting is a narrative piece, for which Ringgold tells a story of the lives of people in an apartment building in Harlem.

The piece was acquired by the Met in 1990 from the artist by way of Bernice Steinbaum Gallery. It was acquired with funds from the Arthur Hoppock Hearn Fund and various other donor funds.

== See also ==
- List of works by Faith Ringgold
