= Faith Ringgold =

American artist (1930–2024)

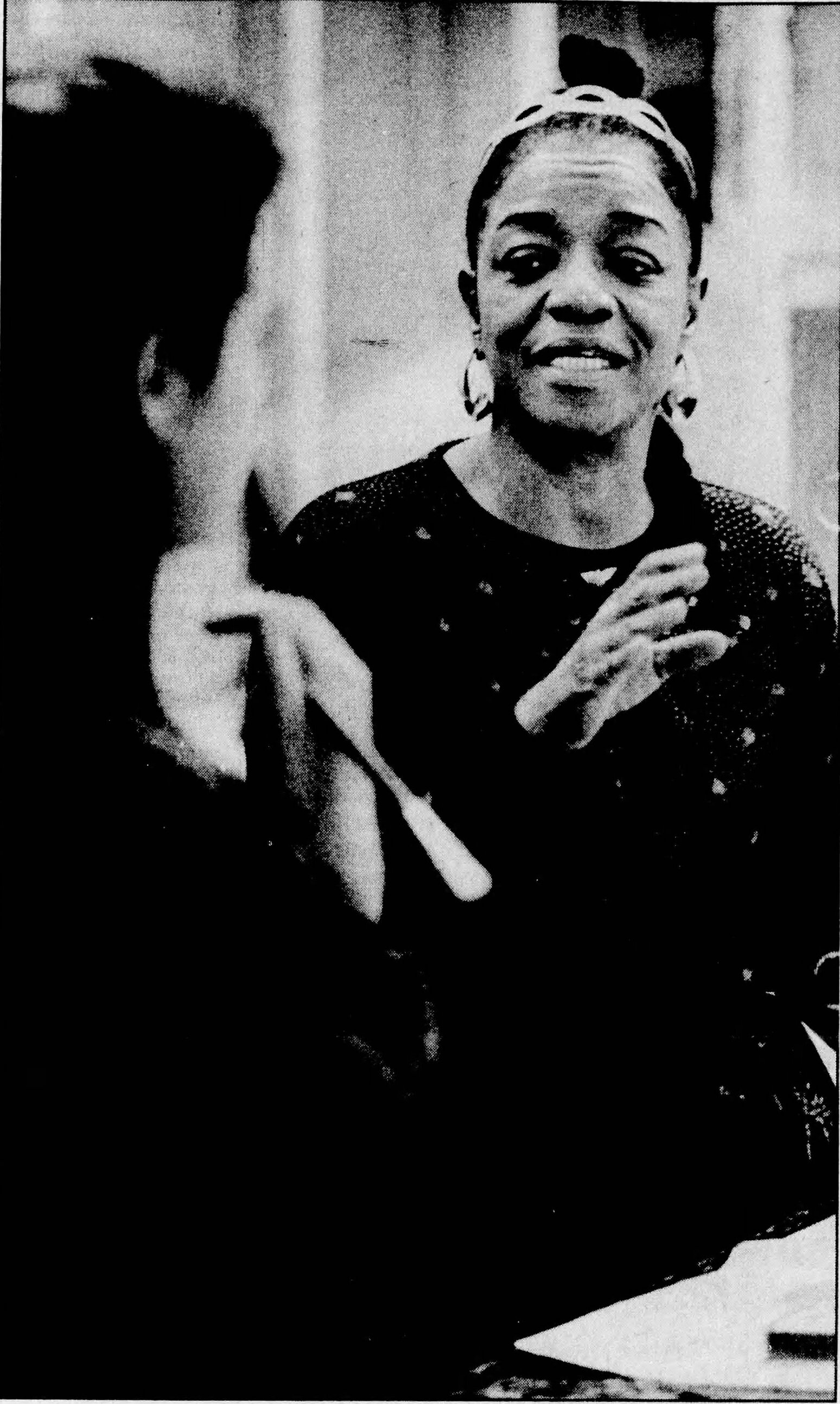
- Ringgold in 1988
- Born: Faith Willi Jones; October 8, 1930; New York City, U.S.
- Died: April 13, 2024 (aged 93); Englewood, New Jersey, U.S.
- Education: City College of New York
- Known for: Painting; Textile arts; Children's Books
- Notable work: The American People Series#18: The Flag is Bleeding (1967); The American People Series#20: Die (1967); Who's Afraid of Aunt Jemima? (1983); Tar Beach (1991); The French Collection (1991–1997); The American Collection (1997)
- Movement: Feminist art movement, Civil rights
- Spouses: Robert Earl Wallace (m. 1950; div. 1954) Burdette Ringgold (m. 1962; died 2020)
- Children: 2, including Michele Wallace
- Awards: 2009 Peace Corps Award

Faith Ringgold (born Faith Willi Jones; October 8, 1930 – April 13, 2024) was an American painter, author, mixed media sculptor, performance artist, and intersectional activist, perhaps best known for her narrative quilts.

Ringgold was born in Harlem, New York City, and earned her bachelor's and master's degrees from the City College of New York. She was an art teacher in the New York City public school system. As a multimedia artist, her works explored themes of family, race, class, and gender. Her series of story quilts, designed from the 1980s on, captured the experiences of Black Americans and became her signature art form. During her career, she promoted the work of Black artists and rallied against their marginalization by the art museums. She wrote and illustrated over a dozen children's books. Ringgold's art has been exhibited throughout the world and is in the permanent collections of The Guggenheim, the Metropolitan Museum of Art, the Museum of Arts and Design, the Philadelphia Museum of Art, and the Schomburg Center for Research in Black Culture.

== Early life ==
Faith Willi Jones was born the youngest of three children on October 8, 1930, in Harlem Hospital, New York City. Her parents, Andrew Louis Jones and Willi Posey Jones, were descendants of working-class families displaced by the Great Migration. Ringgold's mother was a fashion designer and her father, as well as working a range of jobs, was an avid storyteller. They raised her in an environment that encouraged her creativity. After the Harlem Renaissance, Ringgold's childhood home in Harlem became surrounded by a thriving arts scene—where figures such as Duke Ellington and Langston Hughes lived just around the corner. Her childhood friend Sonny Rollins, who became a prominent jazz musician, often visited her family and practiced saxophone at their parties.

Because of her chronic asthma, Ringgold explored visual art as a major pastime through the support of her mother, often experimenting with crayons as a young girl. She also learned how to sew and work creatively with fabric from her mother. Ringgold maintained that despite her upbringing in Great Depression–era Harlem, 'this did not mean [she] was poor and oppressed'—she was 'protected from oppression and surrounded by a loving family.' With all of these influences combined, Ringgold's future artwork was greatly affected by the people, poetry, and music she experienced in her childhood, as well as the racism, sexism, and segregation she dealt with in her everyday life.

In 1948, due to pressure from her family, Ringgold enrolled at the City College of New York to major in art, but was forced to major in art education instead, as City College only allowed women to be enrolled in certain majors. In 1950, she married a jazz pianist named Robert Earl Wallace and had two children, Michele and Barbara Faith Wallace, in 1952. Ringgold and Wallace separated four years later due to his heroin addiction. In the meantime, she studied with artists Robert Gwathmey and Yasuo Kuniyoshi. She was also introduced to printmaker Robert Blackburn, with whom she would collaborate on a series of prints 30 years later.

In 1955, Ringgold received her bachelor's degree from City College and soon afterward taught in the New York City public school system. In 1959, she received her master's degree from City College and left with her mother and daughters on her first trip to Europe. While traveling abroad in Paris, Florence, and Rome, Ringgold visited many museums, including the Louvre. This museum in particular inspired her future series of quilt paintings known as The French Collection (1991–1997). This trip was abruptly cut short, however, due to the untimely death of her brother in 1961. Ringgold, her mother, and her daughters all returned to the United States for his funeral. She married Burdette Ringgold on May 19, 1962.

Ringgold visited West Africa twice: once in 1976 and again in 1977. These travels deeply influenced her mask making, doll painting, and sculptures.

== Artwork ==
Ringgold's artistic practice was extremely varied—from painting to quilts, from sculptures and performance art to children's books. As an educator, she taught in both the New York City Public school system and at college level. In 1973, she quit teaching public school to devote herself to creating art full-time. In 1995, she was approached by ACA Galleries for exclusive representation and was represented by them for the rest of her life.

=== Painting ===
Ringgold began her painting career in the 1950s after receiving her degree. Her early work is composed with flat figures and shapes. She was inspired by the writings of James Baldwin and Amiri Baraka, African art, Impressionism, and Cubism to create the works she made in the 1960s. Though she received a great deal of attention with these images, many of her early paintings focused on the underlying racism in everyday activities; which made sales difficult, and disquieted galleries and collectors. These works were also politically based and reflected her experiences growing up during the Harlem Renaissance—themes which matured during the Civil Rights Movement and Women's movement.

Taking inspiration from artist Jacob Lawrence and writer James Baldwin, Ringgold painted her first political collection named the American People Series in 1963, which portrays the American lifestyle in relation to the Civil Rights Movement. American People Series illustrates these racial interactions from a female point of view, and calls basic racial issues in the United States of America into question. In a 2019 article with Hyperallergic magazine, Ringgold explained that her choice for a political collection comes from the turbulent atmosphere around her: "( ... ) it was the 1960s and I could not act like everything was okay. I couldn't paint landscapes in the 1960s—there was too much going on. This is what inspired the American People Series." This revelation stemmed from her work being rejected by Ruth White, a gallery owner in New York. Oil paintings like For Members Only, Neighbors, Watching and Waiting, and The Civil Rights Triangle also embody these themes.

For the Women's House (1971) at the Brooklyn Museum in 2023

In 1972, as part of a commission sponsored by the Creative Artists Public Service Program, Ringgold installed For the Women's House in the Women's Facility on Rikers Island. The large-scale mural is an anti-carceral work, composed of depictions of women in professional and civil servant roles, representing positive alternatives to incarceration. The women portrayed are inspired by extensive interviews Ringgold conducted with women inmates, and the design divides the portraits into triangular sections—referencing Kuba textiles of the Democratic Republic of the Congo. It was her first public commission and widely regarded as her first feminist work. Subsequently, the work inspired the creation of Art Without Walls, an organization that brings art to prisons.

Around the opening of her show for American People, Ringgold also worked on her collection called America Black (also called the Black Light Series), in which she experimented with darker colors. This was spurred by her observation that "white western art was focused around the color white and light/contrast/chiaroscuro, while African cultures, in general used darker colors and emphasized color rather than tonality to create contrast." This led her to pursue "a more affirmative Black aesthetic". Her American People series concluded with larger-scale murals, such as The Flag is Bleeding, U.S. Postage Stamp Commemorating the Advent of Black Power People, and Die. These murals lent her a fresher and stronger prospective to her future artwork.

Her piece, Black Light Series #10: Flag for the Moon: Die Nigger, 1969—which was created in response to the first image of the Apollo 11 Moon landing—was to be purchased by the Chase Manhattan Bank, after Ringgold's work caught the attention of David Rockefeller, the chief executive of the bank. He sent a couple of representatives to buy a piece, and they realized, only after the artist suggested they actually read the text on her work, that the stars and stripes of the American flag as depicted also optically incorporated the phrase "DIE NIGGER". The representatives instead purchased Black Light #9: American Spectrum. In 2013, Black Light Series #10: Flag for the Moon: Die Nigger was shown in the artist's solo exhibition at ACA Galleries in New York, where it was highlighted by the artist and critic Paige K. Bradley in the first solo show coverage Ringgold had ever received from Artforum up until then, preceding Beau Rutland's own review two months later. The piece Black Light #1: Big Black, from 1967, is included in the permanent collection of Pérez Art Museum Miami.

During the 1970s she also made a "Free Angela" poster design for the Black Panthers. Although it was never widely produced Ringgold stated that she had given a copy of the design to Angela Davis herself.

In terms of the place of painting in her practice as whole, the artist considered it her "primary means of expression," as she noted in an interview on the occasion of a retrospective at the New Museum in New York City, from 2022. She went on to note: "My work is always autobiographical—it's about what is happening at the time. I always do what is honest to me. I think all artists should try to be knowledgeable about the world and express feelings about what they're observing, what's important to them. My advice is: Find your voice and don't worry about what other people think."

=== Quilts and other textiles ===
Tar Beach 2 (1990), by Ringgold. This painted story quilt tells the story of Cassie Louise Lightfoot, an 8-year-old girl who dreams of flying over her family's Harlem apartment building and throughout the rest of New York City. Photo taken at the Delaware Art Museum in 2017.

Ringgold stated she switched from painting to fabric to get away from the association of painting with Western European traditions. She turned to textile, fiber arts, and mixed media assemblages as a means of both engaging with African sources associated with the Black Arts movement and the "craft" media associated with the feminist movement. The use of textiles like quilts also gave Ringgold the autonomy advocated by the feminist movement: she could simply roll up her quilts to take to the gallery, therefore negating the need of any assistance from her husband.

Ringgold's initial inspiration to incorporate this kind of media into her own work came, however, from outside the Black Arts and feminist art movements. In the summer of 1972, Ringgold travelled to Europe with her daughter Michele. While Michele went to visit friends in Spain, Ringgold continued on to Germany and the Netherlands. In Amsterdam, she visited the Rijksmuseum, which became one of the most influential experiences affecting her mature work, and subsequently, led to the development of her quilt paintings. In the museum, Ringgold encountered a collection of 14th- and 15th-century Tibetan thangkas (Tibetan Buddhist paintings mounted on a textile backing), which inspired her to produce fabric borders around her own work.

Ringgold created her first thangka-inspired works with the Feminist series. Each of the vertically-oriented works in this series consisted of an unstretched painted scene, centered on an abstracted landscape, that was framed with a fabric border. Ringgold paired the landscape with a quote drawn from the anthology Black Women in White America. Statements by African-American women like Shirley Chisholm and Sojourner Truth emphasized gender prejudice as stronger than racial prejudice. The Slave Rape Series was another set of works echoing the format and materials of the thangka. In these works, Ringgold took the perspective of an African woman captured and sold into slavery. Her mother, Willi Posey, collaborated with her on this project, as Posey was a popular Harlem clothing designer and seamstress during the 1950s and taught Ringgold how to quilt in the African-American tradition. This collaboration eventually led to their first quilt, Echoes of Harlem, in 1980. Ringgold was also taught the art of quilting in an African-American style by her grandmother, who had in turn learned it from her mother, Susie Shannon, who was a slave.

Ringgold quilted her stories to be heard, since at the time no one would publish the autobiography she had been working on; making her work both autobiographical and artistic. In an interview with the Crocker Art Museum she stated, "In 1983, I began writing stories on my quilts as an alternative. That way, when my quilts were hung up to look at, or photographed for a book, people could still read my stories." Her first quilt story Who's Afraid of Aunt Jemima? (1983) depicts the story of Aunt Jemima as a matriarch restaurateur and fictionally revises "the most maligned Black female stereotype." Another piece, titled Change: Faith Ringgold's Over 100 Pounds Weight Loss Performance Story Quilt (1986), engages the topic of "a woman who wants to feel good about herself, struggling to [the] cultural norms of beauty, a person whose intelligence and political sensitivity allows her to see the inherent contradictions in her position, and someone who gets inspired to take the whole dilemma into an artwork".

The series of story quilts from Ringgold's French Collection (1991–1997) explores France, which was central to the emergence of modernism and modern art, as a place where African-American artists could find their own "modern" identity. Each quilt features an episode in the life of a fictional Black woman painter, Willia Marie Simone.Sunflowers Quilting Bee at Arles features historical African-American women who dedicated themselves to fighting oppression and changing the world. In other quilts from the series, Simone is shown posing nude for modernist artists Pablo Picasso and Henri Matisse, but also turns the tables in Picnic at Giverny (a parodic citation of Edouard Manet's Luncheon on the Grass), in which she paints a nude Picasso while accompanied by contemporary women who, like Ringgold, were working to increase women's participation in the art world. The series calls out and challenges the male gaze, and illustrates the immersive power of historical fantasy and childlike imaginative storytelling. Many of Ringgold's quilts went on to inspire the children's books that she later made, such as Tar Beach (published in 1991 based on the 1988 story quilt of the same name) and Dinner at Aunt Connie's House (1993) published by Hyperion Books, based on The Dinner Quilt (1988). Tar Beach, the first of Ringgold's children's books, won many awards, including the Caldecott Honor book award and the Coretta Scott King Award for illustration.

Ringgold followed The French Collection with The American Collection (1997), a series of quilts that continues the narrative from The French Collection.

=== Sculpture ===
In 1973, Ringgold began experimenting with sculpture as a new medium to document her local community and national events. Her sculptures range from costumed masks to hanging and freestanding soft sculptures, representing both real and fictional characters from her past and present. She began making mixed-media costumed masks after hearing her students express their surprise that she did not already include masks in her artistic practice. The masks were pieces of linen canvas that were painted, beaded, and woven with raffia for hair, and rectangular pieces of cloth for dresses with painted gourds to represent breasts. She eventually made a series of eleven mask costumes, called the Witch Mask Series, in a second collaboration with her mother. These costumes could also be worn, but would lend the wearer female characteristics, such as breasts, bellies, and hips. In her memoir We Flew Over the Bridge, Ringgold also noted that in traditional African rituals, the mask wearers would be men, despite the mask's feminine features. In this series, however, she wanted the masks to have both a "spiritual and sculptural identity", The dual purpose was important to her: the masks could be worn, and were not solely decorative.

After the Witch Mask Series, in 1973 she moved onto another series of 31 masks, the Family of Woman Mask Series, which commemorated women and children whom she had known as a child. She later began making dolls with painted gourd heads and costumes (also made by her mother, which subsequently lead her to life-sized soft sculptures). The first of this series was her piece, Wilt, a 7'3" portrait sculpture of basketball player Wilt Chamberlain. She began with Wilt as a response to some negative comments that Chamberlain made about African-American women in his autobiography. Wilt features three figures, the basketball player with a white wife and a mixed daughter, both fictional characters. The sculptures had baked and painted coconuts shell heads, anatomically-correct foam and rubber bodies covered in clothing, and hung from the ceiling on invisible fishing lines. Her soft sculptures evolved even further into life-sized "portrait masks", representing characters from her life and society, from unknown Harlem denizens to Martin Luther King Jr. She carved foam faces into likenesses that were then spray-painted—however, in her memoir she described how the faces later began to deteriorate and had to be restored. She did this by covering the faces in cloth, molding them carefully to preserve the likeness.

=== Performance art ===
As many of Ringgold's mask sculptures could also be worn as costumes, her transition from mask-making to performance art was a self-described "natural progression". Though art performance pieces were abundant in the 1960s and 1970s, Ringgold was instead inspired by the African tradition of combining storytelling, dance, music, costumes, and masks into one production. Her first piece involving these masks was The Wake and Resurrection of the Bicentennial Negro. The work was a response to the American Bicentennial celebrations of 1976; a narrative of the dynamics of racism and the oppression of drug addiction. She voiced the opinion of many other African Americans—there was "no reason to celebrate two hundred years of American Independence ... for almost half of that time we had been in slavery". The piece was performed in mime with music and lasted thirty minutes, and incorporated many of her past paintings, sculptures, and installations. She later moved on to produce many other performance pieces including a solo autobiographical performance piece called Being My Own Woman: An Autobiographical Masked Performance Piece, a masked story performance set during the Harlem Renaissance called The Bitter Nest (1985), and a piece to celebrate her weight loss called Change: Faith Ringgold's Over 100 Pound Weight Loss Performance Story Quilt (1986). Each of these pieces were multidisciplinary, involving masks, costumes, quilts, paintings, storytelling, song, and dance. Many of these performances were also interactive, as Ringgold encouraged her audience to sing and dance with her. She described in her autobiography, We Flew Over the Bridge, that her performance pieces were not meant to shock, confuse or anger, but rather "simply another way to tell my story".

=== Posters ===
Throughout her career Ringgold created many posters and prints. In the aftermath of the deadly 1971 Attica prison riots in upstate New York, Ringgold created her iconic lithograph United States of Attica (1972).

=== Publications ===
Ringgold wrote and illustrated 17 children's books. Her first was Tar Beach, published by Crown in 1991, based on her quilt story of the same name. For that work she won the Ezra Jack Keats New Writer Award and the Coretta Scott King Award for Illustration. She was also the runner-up for the Caldecott Medal, the premier American Library Association award for picture book illustration. In her picture books, Ringgold approached complex issues of racism in straightforward and hopeful ways, combining fantasy and realism to create an uplifting message for children.

== Activism ==
Ringgold was an activist during much of her life, participating in several feminist and anti-racist organizations. In 1968, fellow artist Poppy Johnson, and art critic Lucy Lippard, founded the Ad Hoc Women's Art Committee with Ringgold and protested a major modernist art exhibition at the Whitney Museum of American Art. Members of the committee demanded that women artists account for fifty percent of the exhibitors and created disturbances at the museum by singing, blowing whistles, chanting about their exclusion, and leaving raw eggs and sanitary napkins on the ground. Not only were women artists excluded from this show, but no African-American artists were represented either. Even Jacob Lawrence, an artist in the museum's permanent collection, was excluded. After participating in more protest activity, Ringgold was arrested on November 13, 1970.

Ringgold and Lippard also worked together during their participation in the group Women Artists in Revolution (WAR). In 1970, Ringgold and her daughter Michele Wallace founded Women Students and Artists for Black Art Liberation (WSABAL). Around 1974, Ringgold and Wallace were founding members of the National Black Feminist Organization. Ringgold was also a founding member of the "Where We At" Black Women Artists, a New York-based women's art collective associated with the Black Arts Movement. The inaugural show of "Where We At" featured soul food rather than traditional cocktails, exhibiting an embrace of cultural roots. The show was first presented in 1971 with eight artists and had expanded to 20 by 1976.

In 1972, Ringgold discussed an upcoming WSABAL show in an interview with Doloris Holmes for the Archives of American Art, describing it as "definitely the first Black female show in New York...we have this show as a result of our insistence, and as a result of the work that WSABAL started."

Ringgold spoke about Black representation in the arts in 2004, saying:

When I was in elementary school I used to see reproductions of Horace Pippin's 1942 painting called John Brown Going to His Hanging in my textbooks. I didn't know Pippin was a Black person. No one ever told me that. I was much, much older before I found out that there was at least one Black artist in my history books. Only one. Now that didn't help me. That wasn't good enough for me. How come I didn't have that source of power? It is important. That's why I am a Black artist. It is exactly why I say who I am."

In 1988, Ringgold co-founded the Coast-to-Coast National Women Artists of Color Projects with Clarissa Sligh. From 1988 to 1996, this organization exhibited the works of African American women across the United States. In 1990, Sligh was one of three organizers of the exhibit Coast to Coast: A Women of Color National Artists' Book Project held from January 14 to February 2, 1990, at the Flossie Martin Gallery, and later at the Eubie Blake Center and the Artemesia Gallery. Ringgold wrote the catalog introduction titled "History of Coast to Coast". More than 100 women artists of color were included. The catalog included brief artist statements and photos of the artists' books, including works by Sligh, Ringgold, Emma Amos, Beverly Buchanan, Elizabeth Catlett, Martha Jackson Jarvis, Howardena Pindell, Adrian Piper, Joyce Scott, and Deborah Willis.

== Later life ==
Throughout the 1970s, Ringgold lectured at Pratt Institute, Banks Street College of Education, and Wagner College. In 1987, Ringgold accepted a teaching position in the Visual Arts Department at the University of California, San Diego. She continued to teach until 2002, when she retired.

In 1995, Ringgold published her first autobiography, We Flew Over the Bridge. The book is a memoir detailing her journey as an artist and life events, from her childhood in Harlem and Sugar Hill, to her marriages and children, to her professional career and accomplishments as an artist. In 1997, she received honorary degrees from Wheelock College in Boston (a Doctorate of Education) and Molloy College in New York (a Doctorate of Philosophy).

Ringgold received over 80 awards and honors and 23 honorary doctorates. She was interviewed for the 2010 film !Women Art Revolution.

== Personal life and death ==
Ringgold resided with her second husband Burdette "Birdie" Ringgold, whom she married in 1962, in a home in Englewood, New Jersey, where she lived and maintained a steady studio practice from 1992. Burdette died on February 1, 2020.

Ringgold died at her home in Englewood, New Jersey, on April 13, 2024, at age 93.

== Copyright suit against BET ==
Ringgold was the plaintiff in a significant copyright case, Ringgold v. Black Entertainment Television. Black Entertainment Television (BET) had aired several episodes of the television series Roc in which a Ringgold poster was shown on nine occasions for a total of 26.75 seconds. Ringgold sued for copyright infringement. The court found BET liable, rejecting a de minimis defense raised by BET, which had argued that the use of Ringgold's copyrighted work was so minimal that it did not constitute an infringement.

== In popular culture ==
- An elementary and middle school in Hayward, California, Faith Ringgold School K–8, was named after her in 2007.
- Her name appears in the lyrics of the Le Tigre song "Hot Topic".
- Her image is included in the iconic 1972 poster Some Living American Women Artists by Mary Beth Edelson.
- She is featured in Sam Pollard's 2021 documentary Black Art: In the Absence of Light.

== Selected exhibitions ==
Ringgold's first one-woman show, American People, opened December 19, 1967, at Spectrum Gallery. The show included three of her murals: The Flag is Bleeding, U.S. Postage Stamp Commemorating the Advent of Black Power, and Die. She wanted the opening to not be "another all white" opening but a "refined Black art affair". There was music and her children invited their classmates. Over 500 people attended the opening, including artists Romare Bearden, Norman Lewis, and Richard Mayhew.

In 2010, Miami Art Museum Director Thom Collins and Neuberger Museum of Art Chief Curator Tracy Fitzpatrick curated American People, Black Light: Faith Ringgold's Paintings of the 1960s. The exhibition includes 49 works from the landmark series American People (1963–67) and Black Light (1967–71), along with related murals and political posters. The catalog was written by Michele Wallace (ISBN 978-0-979-56293-8). It was shown at the following venues:

- Neuberger Museum of Art, Purchase, New York (September 11 – December 19, 2010)
- Miami Art Museum, Miami, Florida (November 6 – January 1, 2012)
- Spelman College Museum of Fine Art, Atlanta, Georgia (February 2 – May 19, 2012)
- National Museum of Women in the Arts, Washington, D.C. (June 21 – November 10, 2013)

In 2019, a major retrospective of Ringgold's work was mounted by London's Serpentine Galleries, from June 6 until September 8. This was Ringgold's first show at a European institution.

In 2020, Ringgold's work was featured in Polyphonic: Celebrating PAMM's Fund for African American Art, a group show at Pérez Art Museum Miami highlighting artists in the museum collection acquired through the PAMM Fund for African American Art, an initiative created in 2013. Along with Ringgold, the exhibiting artists included Tschabalala Self, Xaviera Simmons, Romare Bearden, Juana Valdez, Edward Clark, Kevin Beasley, and others.

In 2022, the New Museum organized a retrospective Faith Ringgold: American People, exhibiting works created over her career. It was exhibited at the New Museum from February 17 – June 5, 2022; it traveled to the de Young Museum, Fine Arts Museum of San Francisco (July 16 – November 27, 2022), the Musee Picasso (January 31 – July 2, 2023), and Museum of Contemporary Art Chicago November 18, 2023 – February 25, 2024). The catalog was edited by Massimiliano Gioni and Gary Carrion-Murayari (ISBN 978-1-838-66422-0).

Ringgold was included in the 2022 exhibition Women Painting Women at the Modern Art Museum of Fort Worth.

From June 27 to October 12, 2025, the High Museum of Art exhibited Faith Ringgold: Seeing Children, describing it as "the most comprehensive exhibition to date of the artist's original children's books" and part of the High's "exhibition series celebrating the art and authors of children's books".

In 2025, a retrospective of Ringgold's work was shown at the Jack Shainman Gallery in its inaugural exhibition dedicated to the trailblazing American artist, author, educator and activist.

== Notable works in public collections ==
- The American People Series #1: Between Friends (1963), Neuberger Museum of Art, Purchase, New York
- The American People Series #4: The Civil Rights Triangle (1963), Glenstone, Potomac, Maryland
- The American People Series#18: The Flag is Bleeding (1967), National Gallery of Art, Washington, D.C.
- The American People Series#20: Die (1967), Museum of Modern Art, New York
- Black Light Series #1: Big Black (1967), Pérez Art Museum Miami
- Black Light Series #3: Soul Sister (1967), Utah Museum of Fine Arts, Salt Lake City
- Black Light Series #7: Ego Painting (1969), Art Institute of Chicago
- America Free Angela (1971), National Museum of African American History and Culture, Smithsonian Institution, Washington, D.C.
- United States of Attica (1971–1972), Art Institute of Chicago; Harvard Art Museums, Cambridge, Massachusetts; Hood Museum of Art, Hanover, New Hampshire; Museum of Fine Arts, Houston; Museum of Modern Art, New York; and Whitney Museum, New York
- For the Women's House (1972), Brooklyn Museum, New York (on long-term loan from Rikers Island, New York City Department of Correction)
- Lucy: The 3.5 Million Year Old Lady (1977), Minneapolis Institute of Art
- Echoes of Harlem (1980), Studio Museum in Harlem, New York
- Who's Afraid of Aunt Jemima? (1983), Glenstone, Potomac, Maryland
- Street Story Quilt, Parts I-III: Accident, Fire, Homecoming (1985), Metropolitan Museum of Art, New York
- Sonny's Bridge (1986), High Museum of Art, Atlanta
- The Bitter Nest, Part I: Love in the School Yard (1987), Phoenix Art Museum
- The Bitter Nest, Part II: The Harlem Renaissance Party (1987), Smithsonian American Art Museum, Smithsonian Institution, Washington D.C.
- Dream 2: King and the Sisterhood (1988), Museum of Fine Arts, Boston
- Woman on a Bridge #1 of 5: Tar Beach (1988), Solomon R. Guggenheim Museum, New York
- Freedom of Speech (1990), Metropolitan Museum of Art, New York
- Tar Beach 2 (1990), Philadelphia Museum of Art; Pennsylvania Academy of the Fine Arts, Philadelphia; and Virginia Museum of Fine Arts, Richmond
- The French Collection Part I, #1: Dancing at the Louvre (1991), Gund Gallery, Kenyon College, Gambier, Ohio
- The French Collection Part I, #5: Matisse's Model (1991), Baltimore Museum of Art
- The French Collection Part I, #7: Picasso's Studio (1991), Worcester Art Museum, Massachusetts
- Feminist Series #10: Of My Two Handicaps (1972/1993), Whitney Museum, New York
- Crown Heights Children's History Story Quilt (1994), PS 22, New York City School Construction Authority
- Flying Home: Harlem Heroes and Heroines (1996), 125th Street station, Metropolitan Transportation Authority, New York
- The American Collection #4: Jo Baker's Bananas (1997), National Museum of Women in the Arts, Washington, D.C.
- The American Collection #5: Bessie's Blues (1997), Art Institute of Chicago
- Coming to Jones Road Print #2: Under a Blood Red Sky (2001), Weatherspoon Art Museum
- People Portraits: in Creativity; Performing; Sports and Fashion (2009), Civic Center/Grand Park station, Los Angeles County Metropolitan Transportation Authority
- In the Classroom: Grace Hopper (2022), Grace Hopper College, Yale University, New Haven, Connecticut

== Publications ==
- Tar Beach, New York: Crown Books for Young Readers, 1991 (1st ed.); Dragonfly Books (Crown), 1996. ISBN 978-0-517-88544-4
- Aunt Harriet's Underground Railroad in the Sky, New York: Crown Books for Young Readers, 1992 (1st ed.); Dragonfly Books, 1995. ISBN 978-0-517-88543-7
- Dinner at Aunt Connie's House, New York: Hyperion Books for Children, 1993. ISBN 978-0-590-13713-3
- We Flew Over The Bridge: Memoirs of Faith Ringgold, Boston: Bulfinch Press (Little, Brown and Company), 1995 (1st ed.); Durham, North Carolina: Duke University Press, 2005. ISBN 978-0-8223-3564-1
- Talking To Faith Ringgold by Faith Ringgold, Linda Freeman and Nancy Roucher, New York: Crown Books for Young Readers, 1996. ISBN 978-0-517-70914-6
- Bonjour, Lonnie, New York: Hyperion Books for Young Readers, 1996. ISBN 978-0-7868-0076-6
- My Dream of Martin Luther King, New York: Dragonfly Books, 1996. ISBN 978-0-517-88577-2
- The Invisible Princess, New York: Crown Books for Young Readers, 1998 (1st ed.); New York: Dragonfly Books, 2001. ISBN 978-0-440-41735-4
- If a Bus Could Talk: The Story of Rosa Parks, New York: Simon & Schuster Books for Young People, 1999 (1st ed.); Aladdin Books (Simon & Schuster), 2001. ISBN 978-0-689-85676-1
- Counting to Tar Beach: A Tar Beach Board Book, New York: Crown Books for Young Readers, 1999. ISBN 978-0-517-80022-5
- Cassie's Colorful Day: A Tar Beach Board Book, New York: Crown Books for Young Readers, 1999. ISBN 978-0-517-80021-8
- Cassie's Word Quilt, New York: Knopf Books for Young Readers, 2002 (1st ed.); Dragonfly Books, 2004; Random House Children's Books, 2012. ISBN 978-0-553-11233-7
- Faith Ringgold: A View from the Studio by Curlee Raven Holton and Faith Ringgold, Boston: Bunker Hill Publishing in association with the Allentown Art Museum, 2004. ISBN 9781593731786
- O Holy Night: Christmas with the Boys Choir of Harlem, New York: Amistad (HarperCollins), 2004. ISBN 978-1-4223-5512-1
- What Will You Do for Peace? Impact of 9/11 on New York City Youth, introduction by Faith Ringgold, Hamden, Connecticut: InterRelations Collaborative, 2004. ISBN 978-0-9761753-0-8
- The Three Witches by Zora Neale Hurston, adapted by Joyce Carol Thomas, illustrated by Faith Ringgold, New York: HarperCollins, 2006. ISBN 978-0-06-000649-5
- Henry Ossawa Tanner: His Boyhood Dream Comes True, Piermont, New Hampshire: Bunker Hill Publishing in association with the Pennsylvania Academy of the Fine Arts, 2011. ISBN 9781593730925
- Bronzeville Boys and Girls (poetry) by Gwendolyn Brooks, illustrated by Faith Ringgold, New York: Amistad, 2007 (1st ed.); HarperCollins, 2015. ISBN 978-3948318130
- Harlem Renaissance Party, New York: Amistad, 2015. ISBN 0060579110
- A Letter to my Daughter, Michele: in response to her book, Black Macho and the Myth of the Superwoman, North Charleston, South Carolina: CreateSpace Independent Publishing Platform, 2015 (written 1980). ISBN 9781517572662
- We Came to America, New York: Knopf, 2016 (1st ed.); Dragonfly Books, 2022. ISBN 978-0-593-48270-4
- Faith Ringgold: Politics / Power by Faith Ringgold, Michele Wallace, and Kirsten Weiss, Berlin: Weiss Publications, 2022. ISBN 394-831813-1

== See also ==
- Feminist art movement in the United States
- Black feminism
