= The American People Series 18: The Flag is Bleeding =

Painting by Faith Ringgold

The American People Series #18: The Flag is Bleeding
- The Flag is Bleeding in 2017 at the Musée du Quai Branly - Jacques Chirac in Paris
- Artist: Faith Ringgold
- Year: 1967
- Medium: Oil on canvas
- Dimensions: 182.88 cm × 243.84 cm (72.00 in × 96.00 in)
- Location: National Gallery of Art, Washington, DC
- Accession: 2021.28.1

The American People Series #18: The Flag is Bleeding is an oil on canvas painting made by American artist Faith Ringgold in 1967. Widely cited as one of Ringgold's most iconic and pivotal works, the painting depicts a Black man, white woman, and white man interlocking arms inside the confines of an American flag dripping with blood, some of which is seemingly from a wound on the Black man's chest. The Flag is Bleeding was painted toward the end of the American Civil Rights movement and explores themes of race, gender, and patriotism.

== Description ==
The work shows three figures standing within the design of an American flag. On the left, a Black man in a black turtleneck holds his right hand over a bloody wound on his chest, in a gesture that recalls reciting the Pledge of Allegiance, while his left hand holds a bloody knife; on the right, a white man in a suit stands with his hands on his hips; in the center, a white woman in a cocktail dress is locking arms with the two men. The figures are variously obscured by the bars and stars of the flag; blood drips from the bars throughout the scene.

Ringgold was partly inspired by Jasper Johns' painting Flag (1954-1955).

== History ==
The Flag is Bleeding was acquired directly from Ringgold's collection by the National Gallery of Art (NGA) in Washington, D.C., in October 2021 with support from Glenstone in Potomac, Maryland. NGA senior curator Harry Cooper said the acquisition "may well be the most important purchase of a single work of contemporary art" for the museum in over 45 years.

== Reception ==
Writing in caa.reviews about the work's showing at the Serpentine Galleries, Juliette Milbach wrote that the work considers "the complex relationship between race and national identity," and "makes a critical argument about the power of figuration," further noting that Ringgold was drawing on and extending a history of Black artists depicting "confrontations with the American flag." Charles Moore observed in The Art Newspaper that "tension spills over into violence" in The Flag is Bleeding, like similar later works in The American People Series. Victoria L. Valentine said in Culture Type that the work "makes a powerful political statement about American democracy and racism."

== See also ==
- List of works by Faith Ringgold
